= Duchy of Głogów =

Silesian duchy (1251–1815)

Coordinates: 51°40′00″N 16°05′00″E

Duchy of Głogów Księstwo Głogowskie (Polish) Hlohovské knížectví (Czech) Herzogtum Glogau (German)
- 1177–1185; 1251–1506
- Coat of arms

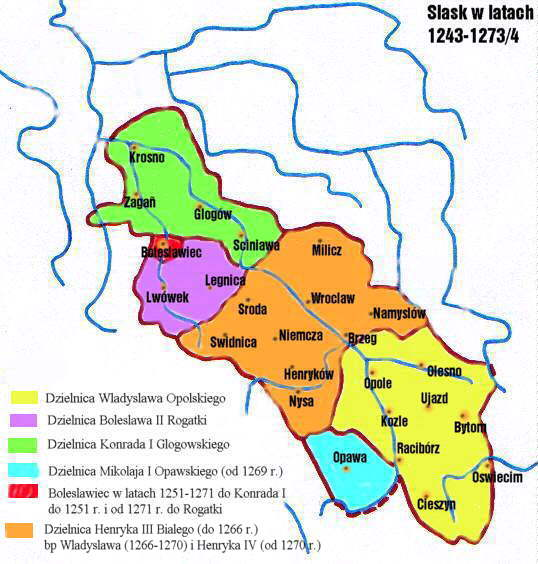
- Silesia 1249-1273: Creation of the Duchy of Głogów (green) for Konrad I from the territory of Bolesław II the Bald of Legnica (violet)
- Status: District duchy of Poland; Fiefdom of the Kingdom of Bohemia(1331); Fiefdom of the Crown of Bohemia (1348–1742); Part of the Kingdom of Prussia (until 1815)
- Capital: Głogów
- Historical era: Middle Ages
  - Partitioned from Silesia: 1177
  - Reintegrated with Silesia: c. 1185
  - Partitioned from Legnica: 1251
  - Split off Żagań: 1273
  - Split off Oleśnica: 1312
  - Vassalized by Bohemia: 1331
  - War of the Głogów succession: 1476–82
  - Passed to John Corvinus: 1488
  - Passed to the Jagiellons: 1491
  - Annexed to Bohemia: 1506
  - Annexed by Prussia: 1742/48
  - Dissolved into newly created Silesia Province: 1815
Preceded by	Succeeded by
Duchy of Legnica	Kingdom of Prussia
- Today part of: Poland

The Duchy of Głogów (Polish: Księstwo głogowskie, Czech: Hlohovské knížectví) or Duchy of Glogau (German: Herzogtum Glogau) was one of the Duchies of Silesia, formed in course of the medieval fragmentation of Poland into smaller provincial duchies. Its capital was Głogów in Lower Silesia. It existed in 1177–1185 and 1251–1506 and was ruled by the Silesian Piasts, followed by John Corvinus and the Jagiellonian dynasty.

== History ==
In 1177, under the rule of Konrad Spindleshanks, the youngest son of High Duke Władysław II the Exile of Poland, the town of Głogów had already become the capital of a duchy in its own right. However, when Konrad died between 1180 and 1190, his duchy was again inherited by his elder brother Bolesław I the Tall, and re-incorporated to the Duchy of Silesia/Wrocław. After the death of Bolesław's grandson Duke Henry II the Pious at the 1241 Battle of Legnica his sons in 1248 divided the Lower Silesian Duchy of Wrocław among themselves. Konrad I, a child when his father died, claimed his rights too and in 1251 and received the northern Głogów territory from his elder brother Bolesław II the Bald, then Duke of Legnica.

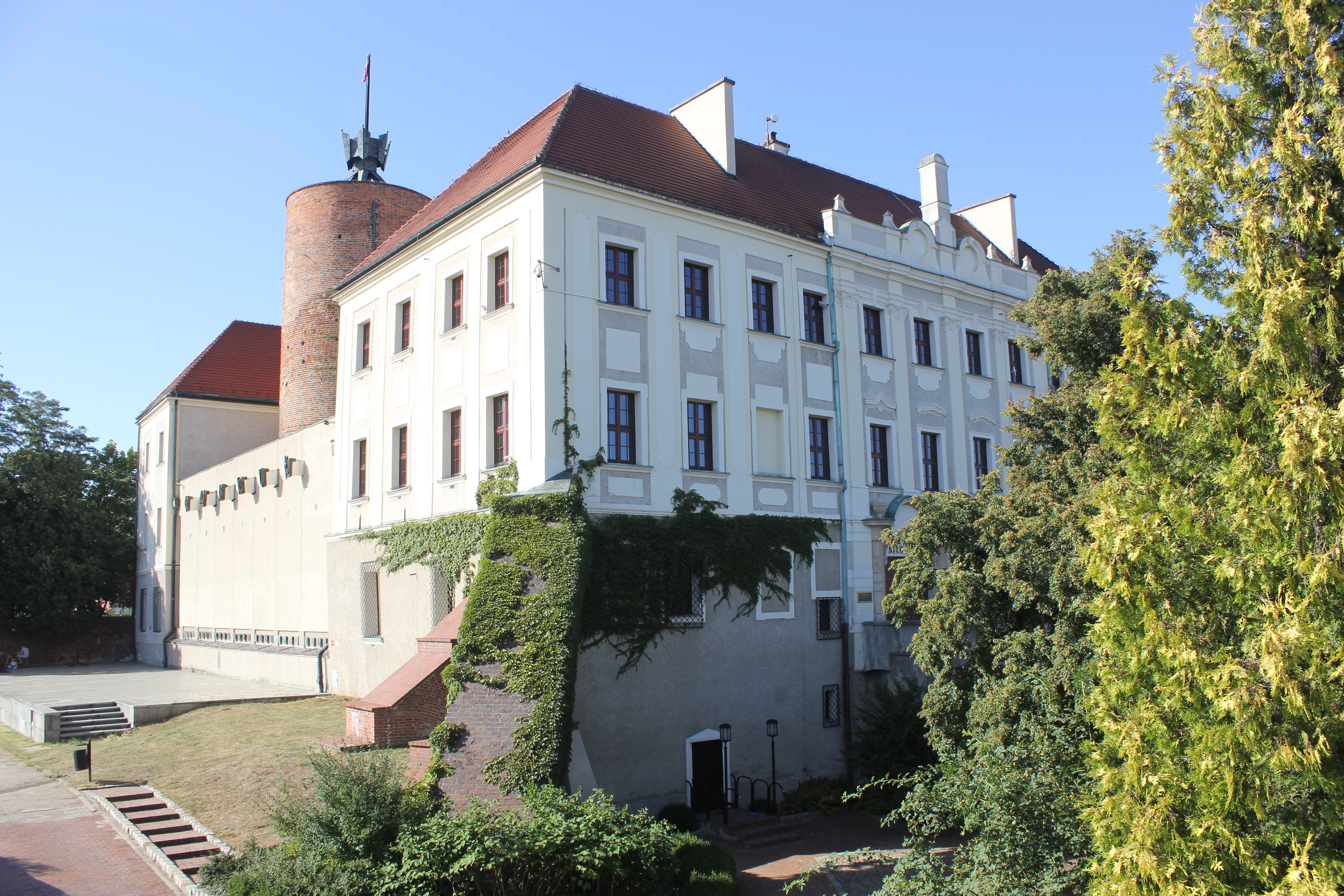
Ducal Castle in Głogów

Under the rule of Konrad's son Henry III the size of the principality was fluctuating, as fragmentation and division continued. In 1273, smaller duchies of Ścinawa and Żagań were split off. In 1296, the duchy expanded to the east and south-west obtaining the towns of Gorzów, Kluczbork, Milicz, Oleśnica, Ścinawa and Trzebnica from the Duchy of Wrocław and Bolesławiec and Chojnów from the Duchy of Legnica. In 1312, the duchies of Oleśnica and Wołów were split off.

After Henry's son Przemko II had died without heirs in 1331, King John the Blind was able to seize the duchy as a fiefdom of the Kingdom of Bohemia, itself part of the Holy Roman Empire, and granted it to the Piast Duke Henry I of Jawor six years later. As Henry I left no issue, King John's son, Charles IV incorporated one half of Głogów into Crown of Bohemia, granting the remaining half to Duke Henry V of Iron of Żagań in 1349.

When in 1476 the Głogów line of the Piast dynasty became extinct with the death of Henry XI, fights over his succession broke out between his cousin Duke Jan II the Mad of Żagań and Elector Albert III Achilles of Brandenburg, the father of Henry's widow Barbara of Brandenburg. In consequence the duchy's northern part of Krosno Odrzańskie (Crossen an der Oder) was incorporated by the Margraviate of Brandenburg in 1482. The truce however was broken by Duke Jan II, who continued his attacks on the neighbouring territories and in 1480 even invaded the royal Bohemian half of the Głogów duchy. This action finally brought the Bohemian antiking Matthias Corvinus to the scene, who in 1488 conquered Głogów, deposed Jan II and made his son John the duke.

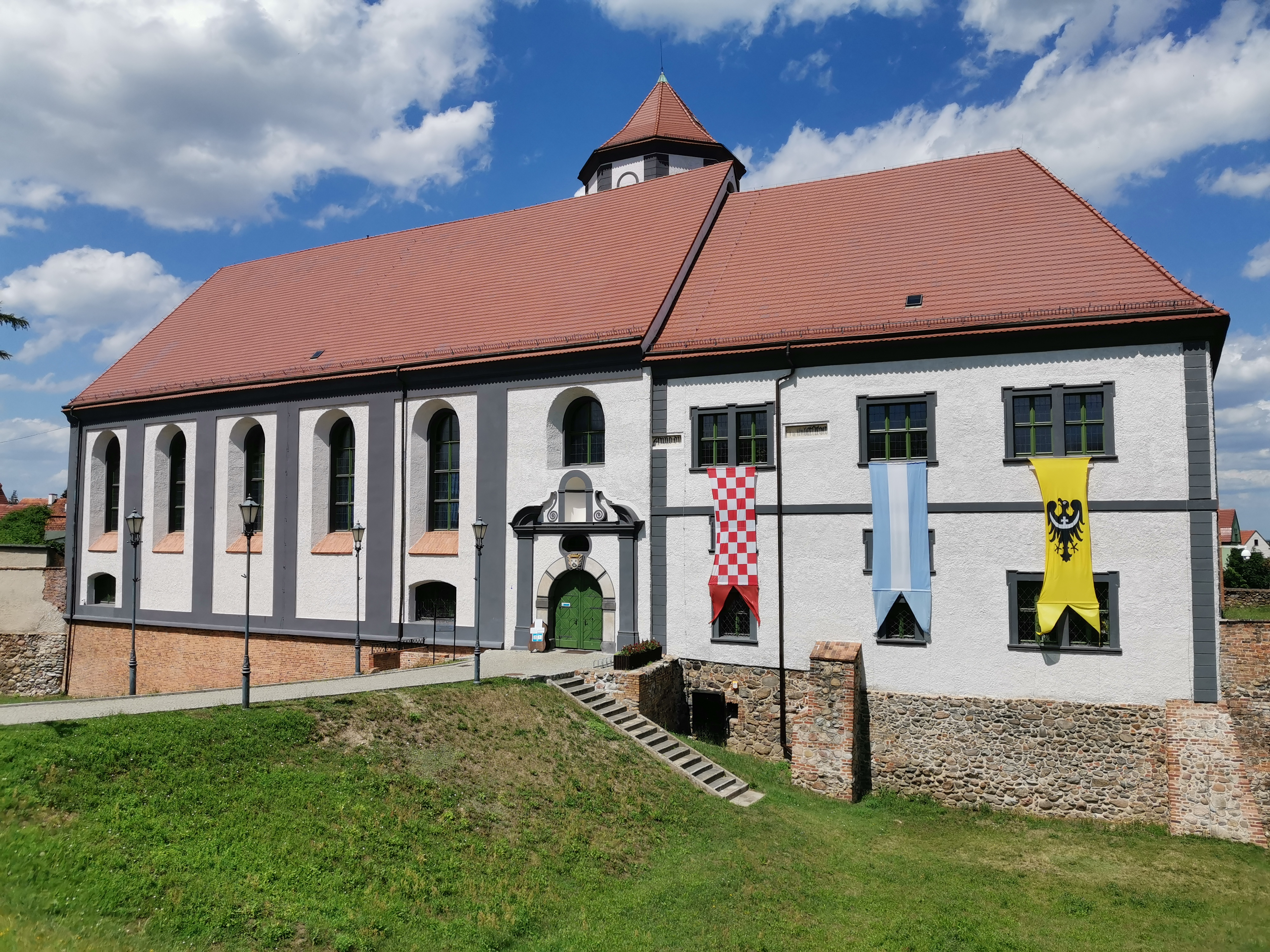
Ducal Castle in Kożuchów

Upon Matthias' death in 1490 his territories were reacquired by Bohemian king Vladislaus II Jagiellon, who granted the fief of Głogów to his brothers John I Albert in 1491 and later Sigismund I the Old in 1499, both future kings of Poland. In 1506 the duchy finally became an immediate dominion of the Bohemian Crown, which, after Vladislaus' son Louis II Jagiellon had died in 1526, were inherited by Archduke Ferdinand I of Austria and became part of the Habsburg monarchy.

Głogów remained part of the Crown of Bohemia within the province of Silesia until the end of the First Silesian War in 1742 when, like the majority of Silesia, it became part of Frederick the Great's Kingdom of Prussia (which was definitively confirmed by the Treaty of Aachen in 1748). Even the Seven Years' War did not change this status. In 1815 the Duchy (along with other Silesian duchies) ceased to exist due to radical administrative reform. All of Silesia was unified into a single administrative unit, Province of Silesia.

Finally, after World War II the territories of Prussian Silesia east of the Oder-Neisse line were granted to Poland by the Allied Powers under the Potsdam Agreement.

== Dukes of Głogów ==
- 1177-1180: Konrad Spindleshanks

Again part of the Duchy of Wrocław, from 1248 on part of Legnica

- 1251 (1241?)-1274: Konrad I
- 1274-1309: Henry III, son
- 1309-1331: Przemko II, son

Duchy vassalized by the Kingdom of Bohemia

- 1337-1346 Henry I of Jawor

Annexed by Bohemia, one half to Duchy of Żagań (1349), ruled by:

- 1349-1369: Henry V of Iron, Duke of Głogów and Żagań
- 1369-1393: Henry VI the Elder, son, jointly with his brothers
  - 1369-1395: Henry VII Rumpold
  - 1369-1378: Henry VIII the Sparrow
- 1395-1397: Henry VIII the Sparrow (alone)
- 1397-1401: Rupert I of Legnica, regent for
- 1397-1412: Jan I of Żagań, son of Henry VIII, jointly with his brothers
  - 1397-1467: Henry IX the Elder
  - 1397-1417: Wenceslaus of Krosno
  - 1397-1423: Henry X Rumpold
- 1467-1476: Henry XI, son of Henry IX

Line extinct, whole duchy directly under the Crown of Bohemia

- 1476-1488: Jan II the Mad of Żagań

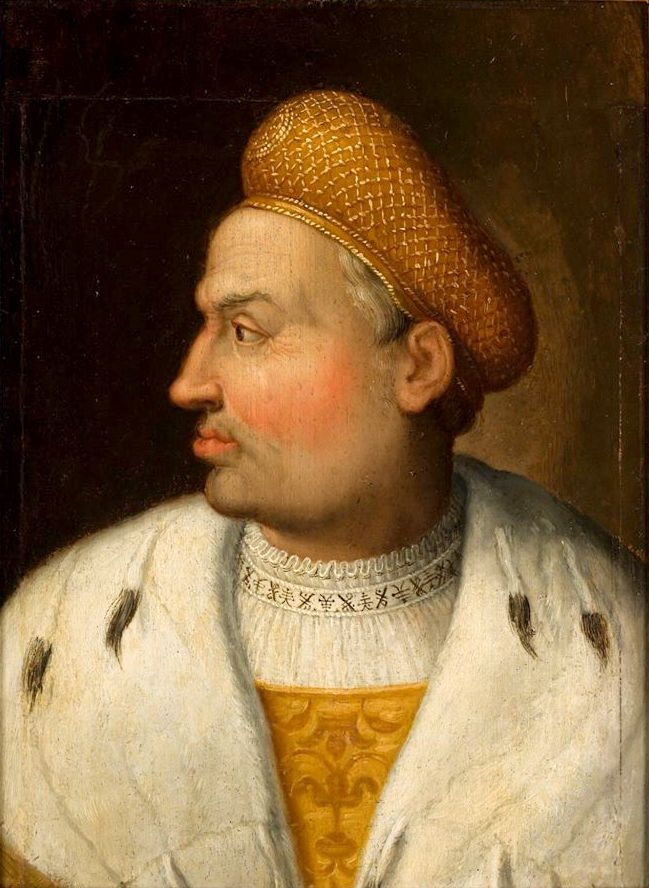
Sigismund I the Old, last duke of Głogów

1482: Northern part sold to Brandenburg

- 1488-1490: John Corvinus as Jan II, Duke of Głogów
  - 1491-1498: John I Albert of Poland
  - 1499-1506: Sigismund I the Old

== Burial sites ==
Burial sites of the dukes of Głogów within the duchy were the Collegiate Church of the Assumption of the Blessed Virgin Mary in Głogów, Lubiąż Abbey and Purification of Saint Mary church in Kożuchów. Several dukes were buried in the Assumption of the Blessed Virgin Mary Church in Żagań and Collegiate Church of the Holy Sepulchre in Legnica in the neighbouring duchies of Żagań and Legnica. Henry X Rumpold was buried in the Haderslev Cathedral in Denmark, whereas John I Albert and Sigismund I the Old as Kings of Poland were buried in the Wawel Cathedral in Kraków.

== See also ==
- Dukes of Silesia
- Silesia Walls of the Duchy of Głogów
