= Duchy of Żagań =

Silesian duchy (1274–1549)

Coordinates: 51°37′00″N 15°19′00″E

Duchy of Żagań Księstwo Żagańskie (pl) Zaháňské knížectví (cs) Herzogtum Sagan (de)
- 1274–1549; 1553–1601; 1627–1634; 1646–1935
- Coat of arms

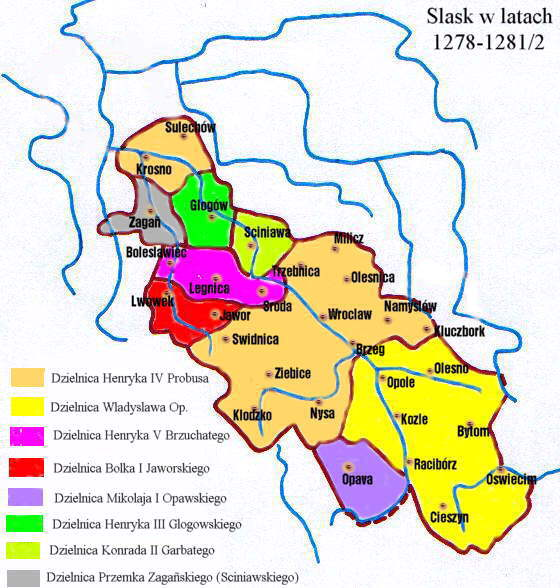
- Silesia 1278 - 1281: The Duchy of Żagań soon after its creation (gray), west of the Duchy of Głogów (green)
- Status: Silesian duchy
- Capital: Żagań
- Historical era: Middle Ages; Early modern period
  - Partitioned from Głogów: 1274
  - Vassalized by Bohemia: 1329
  - Sold to Saxony: 1472
  - Seized by Bohemia: 1549
  - Passed to Lobkowicz family: 1646
  - Passed to the dukes of Courland: 1786
  - Passed to the House of Talleyrand-Périgord: 1844
  - Seized by Nazi Germany: 1935
Preceded by	Succeeded by
Duchy of Głogów	Lands of the Bohemian Crown
- Today part of: Poland; Germany¹
- ¹ The villages of Pechern (Polish: Smolarze) and Neudorf (Nowa Wieś)

The Duchy of Żagań (Polish: Księstwo Żagańskie, Czech: Zaháňské knížectví) or Duchy of Sagan (German: Herzogtum Sagan) was one of the duchies of Silesia ruled by the Silesian Piasts. Its capital was Żagań in Lower Silesia, the territory stretched to the town of Nowogród Bobrzański in the north and reached the Lusatian Neisse at Przewóz in the west, including two villages beyond the river (Pechern and Neudorf).

It was formed in 1274 from the western part of the Duchy of Głogów and existed under Piast rule until 1304, then again from 1322 to 1394 and from 1413 to 1472. Since 1329 it was under the suzerainty of Bohemia; it was acquired by the Saxon House of Wettin in 1472, before it was finally seized by the Bohemian king in 1549.

The Żagań ducal title later passed to Bohemian and French nobility, in 1742 it was annexed by Prussia. Re-established as a fief of the Prussian throne in 1844, it formally existed until its official termination in 1935.

== History ==
=== Piast rule ===
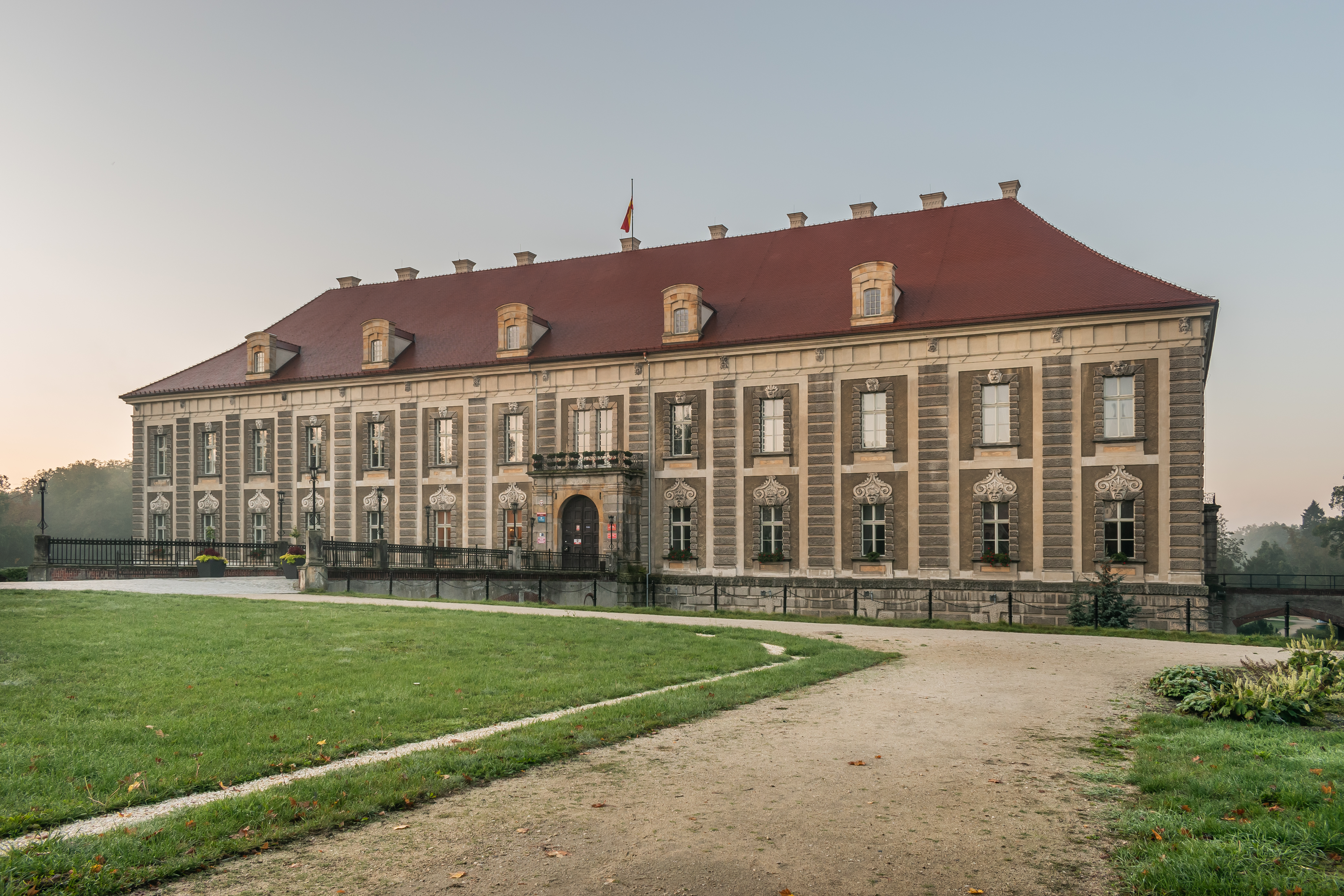
Żagań Palace

After the death of Duke Konrad I of Głogów, his heirs divided his duchy. The castle at Żagań became the residence of his youngest son Przemko, the first Duke of Żagań from 1278, who established a monastery of Augustinian Canons there. In 1284 he swapped his estates for the Duchy of Ścinawa and was succeeded by his elder brother Konrad II the Hunchback. When Konrad II died in 1304 all former Głogów estates were re-unified under his surviving brother Henry III.

In 1309 Henry III of Głogów was followed by his eldest son Henry IV the Faithful, who in 1321 divided the duchy again between him and his younger brothers. He ceded Głogów to Przemko II and retired to Żagań, which again became the capital of a duchy in its own right. From 1322 to c. 1324–1325, Henry IV additionally controlled the eastern part of Lubusz Land with the towns of Torzym and Sulęcin, and the Międzyrzecz castellany in north-western Greater Poland. In 1329 all sons of Henry III of Głogów became vassals of King John of Bohemia - with the exception of Przemko II who died suddenly two years later. In 1353, the towns of Nowe Miasteczko and Polkowice passed to the Duchy of Żagań from the Duchy of Ścinawa. When in 1393 Henry VI the Elder, grandson of Henry IV died without issue, the estates were again re-unified with Głogów until in 1412 Jan I, the eldest son of Duke Henry VIII the Sparrow became the sole ruler of the Żagań duchy. After a fierce battle for the inheritance, in 1472 his son Jan II the Mad finally sold it to the Saxon duke Albert III the Bold with the consent of the Bohemian king Matthias Corvinus, thus ending the centuries-long Piast rule.

The former Augustinian monastery complex in Żagań with the church of the Assumption, the main burial site of Piast dukes of Żagań, is designated a Historic Monument of Poland.

=== Wettin and Lobkowicz rule ===
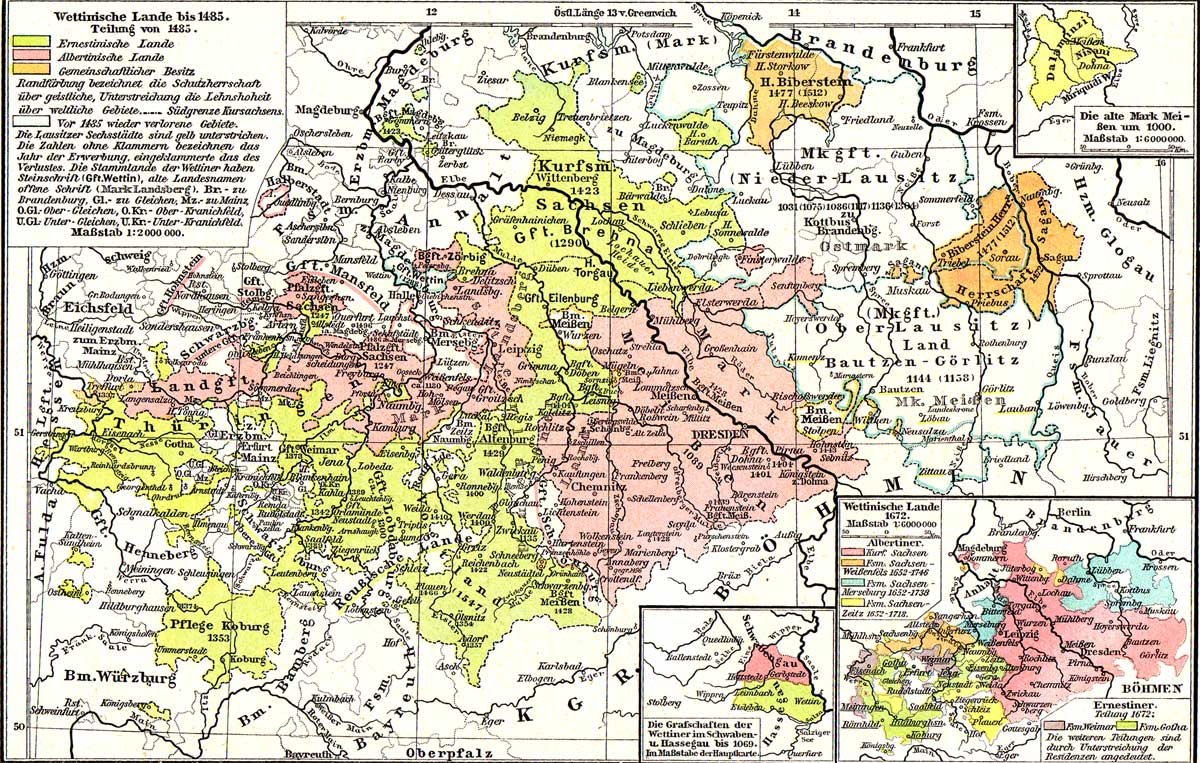
Wettin lands with eastern Żagań exclave (orange) in 1485. In 1549, Maurice of Saxony exchanged it with Ferdinand I, Holy Roman Emperor for some minor Bohemian lands.

Duke Albert III, the progenitor of the Albertine line of the Wettin dynasty, ruled jointly with his elder brother Elector Ernest, even after the partition of the Wettin lands in 1485. With the accession of Albert's son Henry IV in 1539, Żagań turned Protestant. The Albertine and Ernestine branches came to a rupture when in the Schmalkaldic War of 1546–47 Duke Maurice of Saxony fought against his cousin John Frederick I, who by the Capitulation of Wittenberg had to renounce his claims to Żagań. In 1549 Maurice, now Elector, swapped Żagań by an agreement with the Bohemian king Ferdinand I of Habsburg.

As a Bohemian fief, Emperor Ferdinand II of Habsburg in 1627 allotted Żagań to Albrecht von Wallenstein, then Duke of Frýdlant, Imperial generalissimo in the Thirty Years' War, who hosted his astrologer Johannes Kepler here. After Wallenstein's assassination it passed to Václav Eusebius František, Prince of Lobkowicz and so to the illustrious Bohemian family of Lobkowicz, who had the Baroque Żagań Palace erected. King Frederick II of Prussia conquered Żagań in the course of the First Silesian War, after which by the 1742 Treaty of Breslau it fell to Prussia.

=== Prussia ===
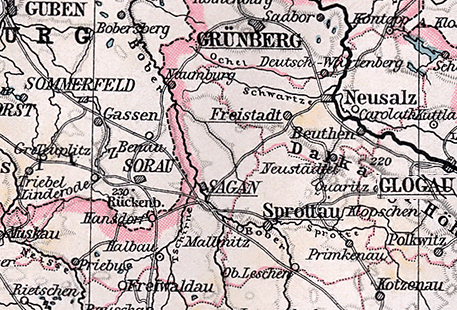
Prussian Sagan district 1816-1932

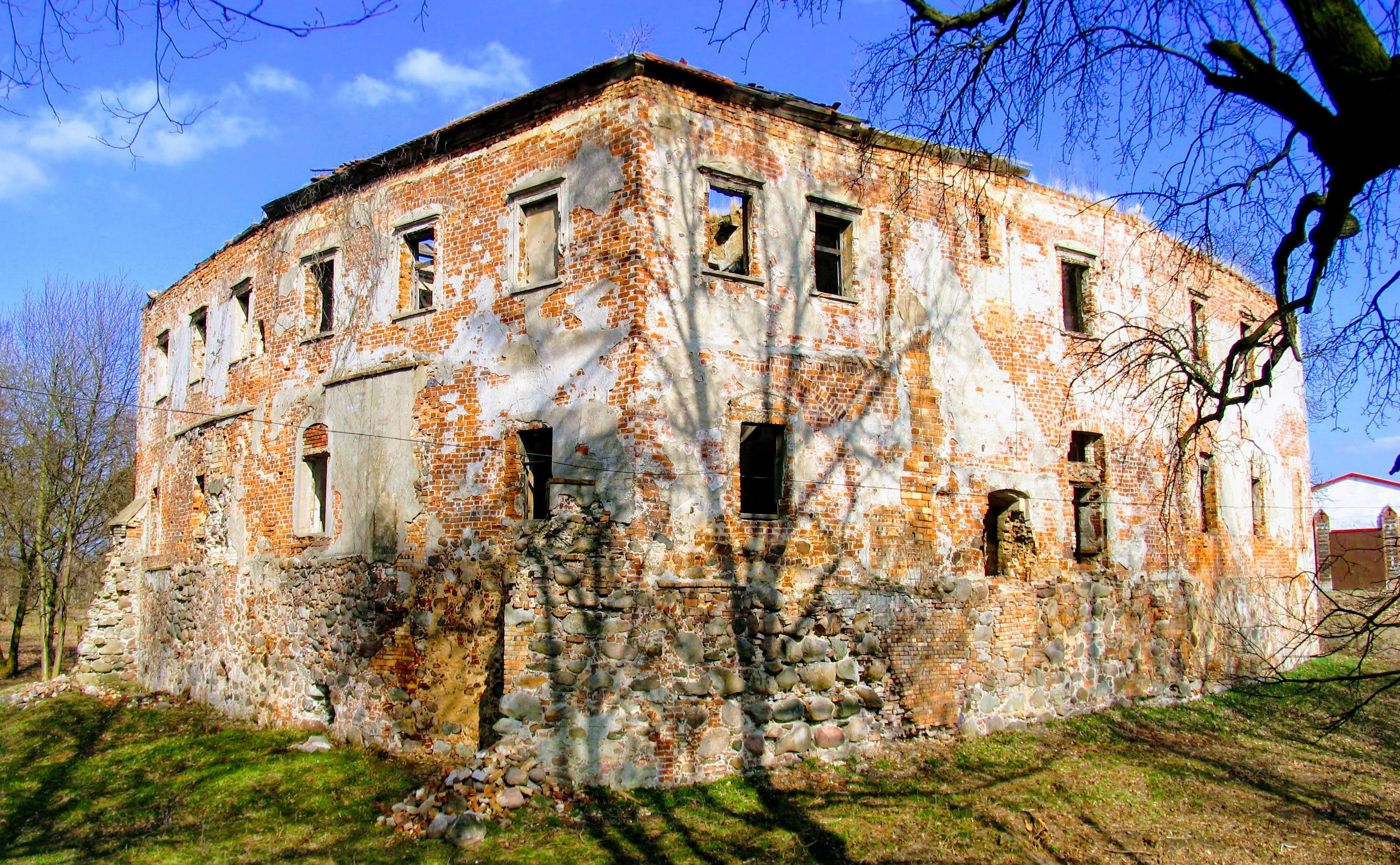
Castle in Janowiec near Szprotawa (Poland), on the border of the former Duchy of Żagań

In 1786 Żagań was purchased by Peter von Biron, Duke of Courland, who bequeathed it to his daughter Wilhelmine, from whom in 1842 it passed to her sister Pauline and finally to her sister Dorothea, the divorced wife of Edmond de Talleyrand-Périgord, a nephew of the great French diplomat Talleyrand. Dorothea came to pass her retirement years at Żagań; a patent of King Frederick William IV of Prussia on 6 January 1845 invested her as Duchess of Sagan and Napoleon III recognized the title in France, in favor of her son Napoleon Louis. In France there is a prince and a duc de Sagan. The double title, both Prussian and French, served to render the duc de Sagan a neutral party in World War II: his Château de Valençay provided a safe haven for treasures of the Louvre during the German occupation of France.

The Duchy had a vote on the Silesian County Council, and the holder in the rank of a Duke was a member of the Prussian House of Lords. In 1900 the duchy had an area of 1,211 km^{2} (468 sq mi) and 65,000 inhabitants. After 1815 it was incorporated into the Prussian Province of Silesia, and was part of Landkreis Sprottau from 1932. With the implementation of the Oder-Neisse line in 1945 the Żagań territory became again part of Poland, with the exception of the strip of land on the western bank of the Neisse river, which became part of East Germany; today this territory belongs to the German municipality of Krauschwitz.

== Dukes ==
- 1273/74–1304 Konrad II the Hunchback, Duke of Silesia
  - 1314–1319 pawned to Margrave Waldemar of Brandenburg-Stendal
- 1319–1342 Henry IV the Faithful, Duke of Głogów
- 1342–1369 Henry V of Iron, Duke of Głogów
- 1369–1378 Henry VI the Elder, Duke of Głogów, jointly with Henry VII Rumpold and Henry VIII the Sparrow
- 1378–1393 Henry VI the Elder
- 1393–1397 Henry VII the Sparrow
- 1397-1403 Duke Rupert I of Legnica, regent
- 1403–1413 Jan I, as guardian of his minor brothers
- 1413–1439 Jan I
- 1439–1450 Balthasar, jointly with his younger brothers Rudolf, Wenceslaus and Jan II
- 1450–1454 Balthasar jointly with Rudolf (d. 1454)
- 1454–1461 and 1467–1472 Balthasar
- 1461–1467 and 1472 Jan II
- 1472–1500 Duke Albert III of Saxony
- 1500–1539 Duke George of Saxony
- 1539–1541 Henry IV of Saxony
- 1541–1549 Duke (from 1547: Elector) Maurice of Saxony
  - 1549 Reversion to Bohemia
- 1628–1634 Albrecht von Wallenstein
  - 1634 seized by the Bohemian Crown
- 1646–1677 Prince Václav Eusebius František of Lobkowicz, president of the Aulic Council
- 1677–1715 Prince Ferdinand August of Lobkowicz
- 1715–1737 Prince Philipp Hyazinth of Lobkowicz
- 1737–1739 Prince Wenzel Ferdinand Karl of Lobkowicz
- 1739–1784 Prince Ferdinand Philipp of Lobkowicz
- 1784–1786 Prince Joseph Franz of Lobkowicz (d. 1816)
- 1786–1800 Peter von Biron, Duke of Courland and Semigallia
- 1800–1839 Wilhelmine von Biron, Princess of Courland
- 1839–1842 Pauline, Princess of Courland, Princess of Hohenzollern-Hechingen
- 1842–1862 Dorothea von Biron, Princess of Courland, married Duke Edmond de Talleyrand-Périgord
- 1862–1898 Napoléon-Louis de Talleyrand-Périgord
- 1898–1906 Boson de Talleyrand-Périgord
- 1906–1910 Hélie de Talleyrand-Périgord (d. 1937)
- 1910-1929 Howard Maurice de Talleyrand-Périgord
  - The noble title of a Duc de Sagan is maintained by the House of Pourtalès descendants of Hélie de Talleyrand-Périgord at the Palace of Marais, Le Val-Saint-Germain, France

== See also ==
- Dukes of Silesia
