= Vladislaus II of Hungary =

King of Bohemia and Hungary (1456–1516)

Vladislaus II
- Fresco from walls of the St. Wenceslas Chapel in St. Vitus Cathedral, Prague (1508)

King of Bohemia
- Reign: 1471–1516
- Coronation: 22 August 1471
- Predecessor: George of Poděbrady
- Successor: Louis II

King of Hungary and Croatia
- Reign: 15 July 1490 – 13 March 1516
- Coronation: 18 September 1490
- Predecessor: Matthias I
- Successor: Louis II
- Born: 1 March 1456; Kraków, Kingdom of Poland
- Died: 13 March 1516 (aged 60); Buda, Kingdom of Hungary
- Burial: Székesfehérvár
- Spouses: Barbara of Brandenburg; Beatrice of Naples; Anne of Foix
- Issue: Anne, Queen of Hungary; Louis II, King of Hungary
- Dynasty: Jagiellon
- Father: Casimir IV of Poland
- Mother: Elizabeth of Austria
- Religion: Catholic Church

Vladislaus II, also known as Vladislav, Władysław, or Wladislas (Hungarian: II. Ulászló; Czech: Vladislav Jagellonský; Croatian: Vladislav II. Jagelović; Slovak: Vladislav II. Jagelovský); (1 March 1456 – 13 March 1516), was King of Bohemia from 1471 to 1516 and King of Hungary and King of Croatia from 1490 to 1516. As the eldest son of Casimir IV Jagiellon, he was expected to inherit the Crown Kingdom of Poland and adjacent Grand Duchy of Lithuania. George of Poděbrady, the Hussite ruler of Bohemia, offered to make Vladislaus his heir in 1468. George needed Casimir's support against the rebellious Roman Catholic noblemen and their ally King of Hungary Matthias Corvinus. The Diet of Bohemia elected Vladislaus king after George's death, but he could rule only Bohemia proper because Matthias, whom the Roman Catholic nobles had elected king, occupied adjacent Moravia, and further east of Silesia in southeastern Germany and both Lusatias. Vladislaus tried to reconquer the four provinces with his father's assistance but was repelled by Matthias.

Vladislaus and Matthias divided the lands of the Crown of Bohemia at the Peace of Olomouc in 1479. The estates of the realm had strengthened their position during the decade-long Bohemian-Hungarian War (1468–1478) known as the war between both kings. Vladislaus's attempts to promote the Roman Catholics caused a rebellion in the capital of Prague and other towns in 1483 that forced him to acknowledge the dominance of the Hussites in the municipal assemblies. The Diet confirmed the right of the Bohemian noblemen and commoners to adhere freely to the religious faith of Hussitism or Roman Catholicism in 1485. After Matthias seized the Silesian duchies to grant them to his illegitimate son, John Corvinus, Vladislaus made new alliances against him in the late 1480s.

Vladislaus, whose mother, Elizabeth of Austria (1436–1505), was the sister of Matthias's predecessor, laid claim to Hungary after Matthias's death. The Diet of Hungary elected Vladislaus king after his supporters had defeated John Corvinus. The other two claimants, Maximilian of Austria (Holy Roman Emperor) and Vladislaus's brother, John I Albert, invaded Hungary, but they could not assert their claim and so made peace with Vladislaus in 1491. He settled in Buda, which enabled the Estates of Bohemia, Moravia, Silesia and both Lusatias to take full charge of state administration. As he had in Bohemia, Vladislaus always approved the decisions of the Royal Council in Hungary, hence his Hungarian nickname "Dobzse László" (Czech: král Dobře, Latin: rex Bene – "King Very Well", from Polish: dobrze). The concessions that he had made before his election prevented the royal treasury from financing a standing army, and Matthias's Black Army of Hungary was dissolved after a rebellion. However, the Ottoman Empire to the southeast made regular raids against the southern border in the Balkan Peninsula and annexed territories in adjacent Croatia.

== Early life ==
Vladislaus was the eldest son of Casimir IV, King of Poland and Grand Duke of Lithuania, and Elizabeth of Austria. She was the daughter of Albert, King of the Romans, Hungary and Bohemia, and Elizabeth of Luxembourg, the only child and sole heiress of the Holy Roman Emperor Sigismund. Vladislaus was born in Kraków on 1 March 1456. His mother and father laid claim to Hungary and Bohemia after her childless brother, Ladislaus the Posthumous, died on 23 November 1457. However, their claims were ignored in both Hungary and Bohemia. The Diet of Hungary elected Matthias Corvinus king on 24 January 1458. The Bohemian Estates of the realm proclaimed the Hussite George of Poděbrady king on 2 March.

Vladislaus was his father's heir in Poland and Lithuania. Casimir IV wanted to prepare all his sons for ruling a realm and tasked renowned scholars with their education. The historian Jan Długosz was Vladislaus's tutor.

Pope Paul II excommunicated George of Poděbrady in late 1466 and proclaimed a crusade against him. The Czech Catholic noblemen rose up against the "heretic" George of Poděbrady and sought assistance from Matthias Corvinus. Matthias declared war in March 1468 and invaded Moravia. On 16 May 1468, George of Poděbrady offered Casimir IV to make Vladislaus his heir if Casimir mediated a peace treaty between Bohemia and Hungary. Matthias refused Casimir's offer, but George of Poděbrady forced him to sign a truce in early 1469. Fearing of losing Matthias's support, the Catholic nobles proclaimed him king of Bohemia in Olomouc on 3 May. After George of Poděbrady repeated his offer of bequeathing Bohemia to Vladislaus, Casimir IV entered into negotiations with the Holy Roman Emperor, Frederick III on George of Poděbrady's behalf. George of Poděbrady died on 22 March 1471.

== Reign ==
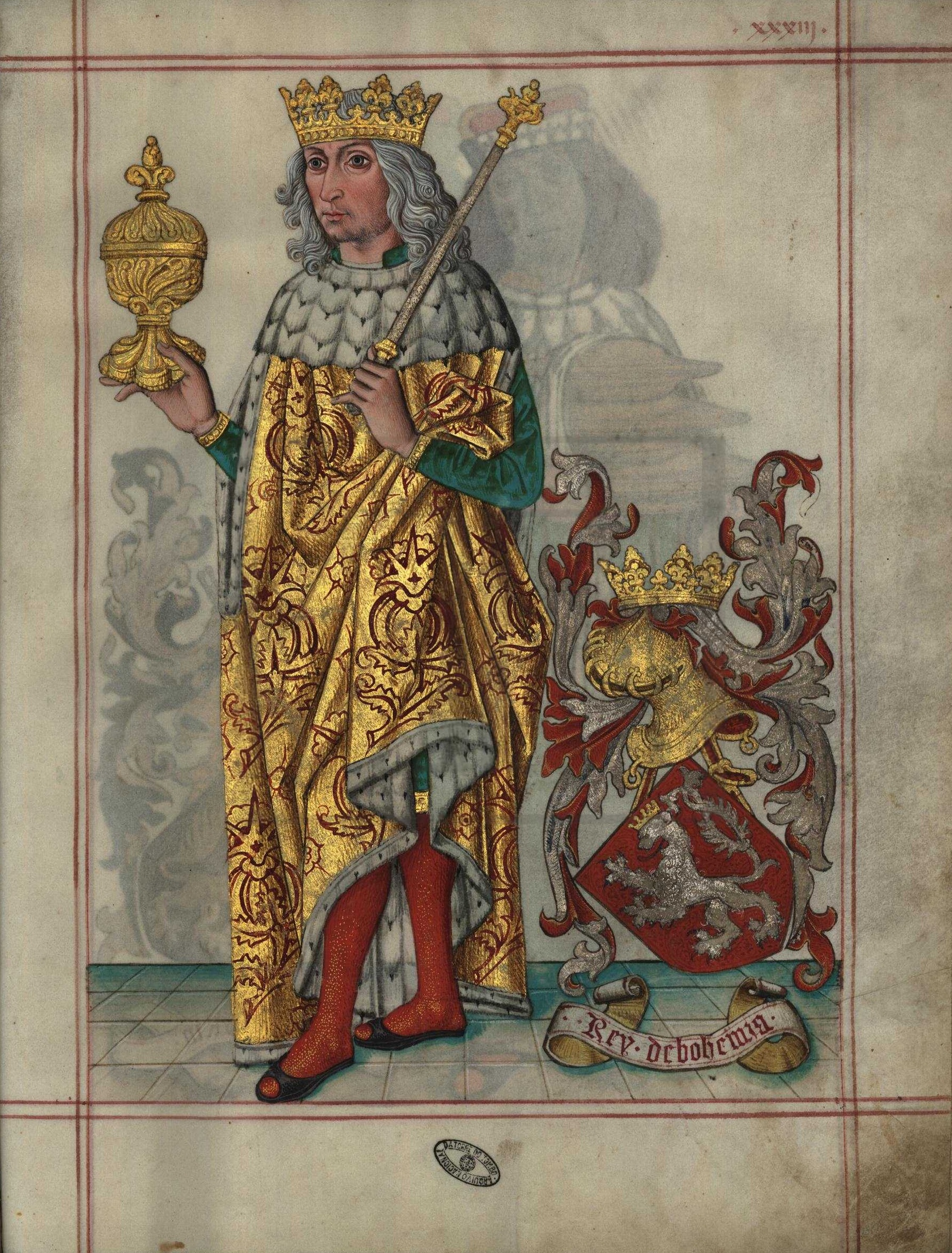
Rey de Bohemia. An ideal portrait of Vladislaus Jagiellon, depicted as the King of Bohemia and "Arch-Cupbearer of the Empire" on fol. 33^{r} of Portuguese armorial Livro do Armeiro-Mor (1509)

=== War for Bohemia ===
After the fifteen-year-old Vladislaus pledged to respect the liberties of the Estates of the realm, the Bohemian Diet elected him king at Kutná Hora on 27 May 1471. He was specifically required to acknowledge the existence of two "nations" (the Catholic and Hussite Estates) in his realm in accordance with the Compacts of Basel, although the Holy See had already condemned the Compacts in 1462. The Holy See regarded Vladislaus's election invalid and the papal legate, Lorenzo Roverella, confirmed Matthias Corvinus's claim to Bohemia on 28 May. However, Emperor Frederick III refused to acknowledge Matthias as the lawful king of Bohemia.

Vladislaus was crowned king in Prague on 22 August 1471. He could only secure his position with the noblemen's support, because no army had accompanied him to Bohemia. Consequently, the Diet developed into the most influential body of state administration during his reign. The Diet started to work as a legislative assembly and passed decrees that were recorded in specific registers.

Casimir IV also supported Vladislaus. He allowed his second son, Vladislaus's brother Casimir, to invade Upper Hungary (now Slovakia) from Poland after a group of Hungarian barons and prelates offered Casimir the Hungarian throne in late 1471. Matthias defeated Casimir and forced him to withdraw from Hungary before the end of the year. On 1 March 1472, Pope Sixtus IV authorized his legate, Marco Barbo, to excommunicate Vladislaus and his father if they continued to wage war against Matthias. The first truce between Vladislaus and Matthias was signed on 31 May. Their representatives continued negotiations for months, often in the presence of the papal legate who supported Matthias's claims. The Diet elected four noblemen at Benešov in 1473 to administer Bohemia as regents until peace was restored.

The representatives of Casimir IV and Matthias concluded a peace treaty on 21 February 1474. Two days later Vladislaus also agreed to sign a truce for three years. Before long, Vladislaus met Frederick III at the Imperial Diet in Nuremberg and persuaded him to make an alliance against Matthias. Casimir IV also joined the coalition. The Polish and Bohemian armies broke into Silesia and besieged Matthias in Wrocław in October. The Hungarian troops cut off the invaders' supply routes, forcing Vladislaus and Casimir to sign a new truce for more than one year on 8 December.

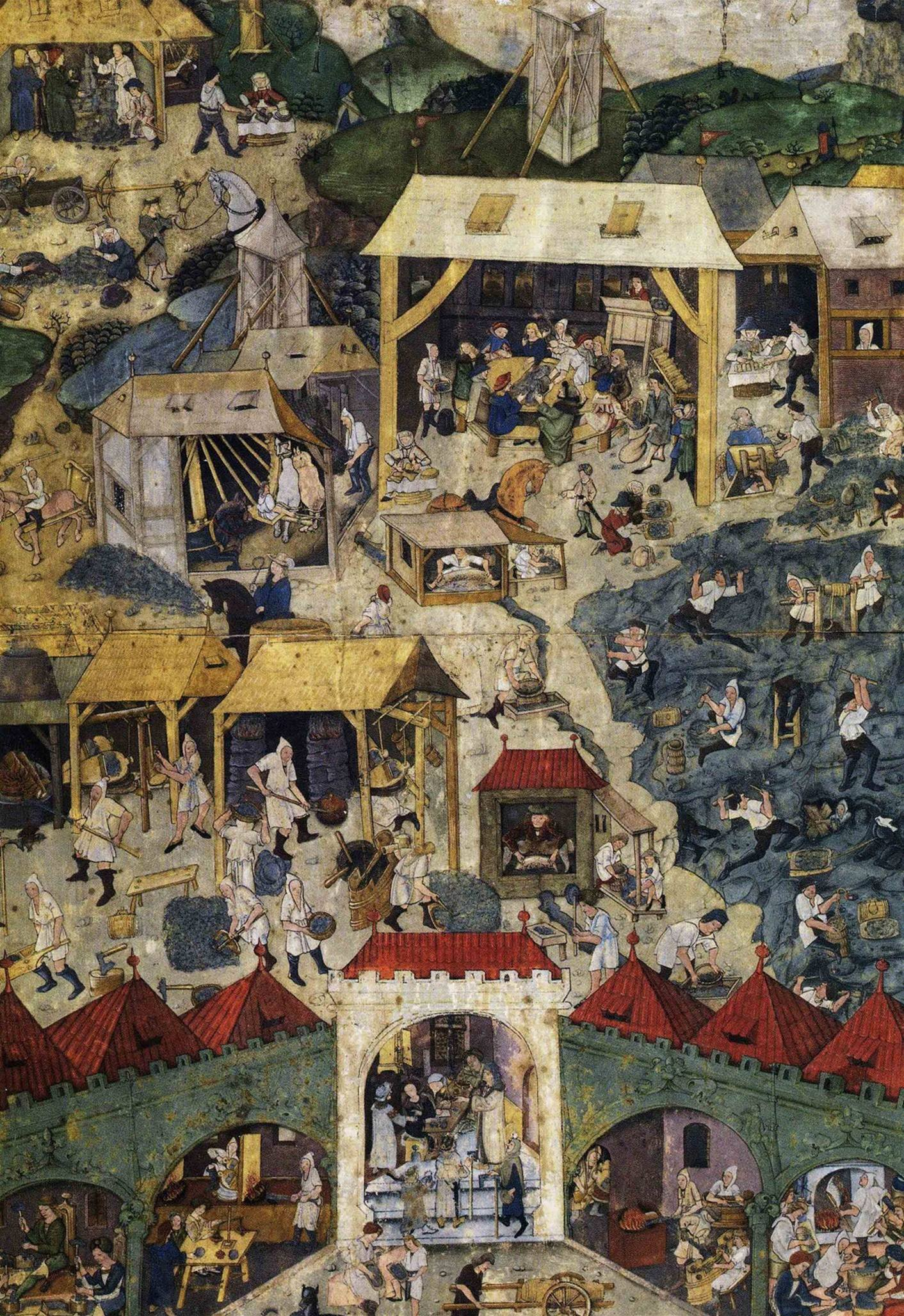
Kutná Hora was the medieval center of silver mining and the second richest town of the Kingdom of Bohemia.

The young Barbara of Brandenburg inherited the Duchy of Głogów in Silesia from her husband, Henry XI of Głogów, in 1476. Most Silesian dukes had years before acknowledged the suzerainty of Matthias Corvinus, but Vladislaus wanted to expand his authority in the province. He married Barbara by proxy to seize her duchy. With Matthias's support, Henry XI's nephew, Jan II, Duke of Żagań, broke into the duchy and occupied it. After Barbara lost her dowry, the Royal Council forbade her to come to Bohemia.

Vladislaus's attempt to seize Głogów gave rise to a new conflict. Vladislaus and Frederick III confirmed their alliance against Matthias on 5 December 1476. The papal legate, Baldasare de Piscia, threatened Vladislaus with excommunication if he invaded Matthias's realms. Frederick III installed Vladislaus as king of Bohemia and Prince-elector of the Holy Roman Empire on 10 June 1477. Two days later, Matthias declared war against the emperor and invaded Austria. Vladislaus sent reinforcements to his ally, but he withdrew his troops from Austria before the end of July. Frederick was forced to acknowledge Matthias as the lawful king of Bohemia on 1 December.

Baldasare de Piscia excommunicated Vladislaus and his supporters on 15 January 1478. The representatives of Vladislaus and Matthias started new negotiations, and they reached a compromise that was accepted by both monarchs. The right of both Vladislaus and Matthias to use the title of king of Bohemia was confirmed, but only Matthias was required to address Vladislaus as such in their correspondence. The Lands of the Bohemian Crown were divided: Vladislaus ruled in Bohemia proper and Matthias in Moravia, Silesia, Upper and Lower Lusatias. The compromise also authorized Vladislaus to redeem the three provinces for 400,000 gold florins after Matthias's death. Matthias and Vladislaus ratified the peace treaty with great pomp and ceremony at a meeting in Olomouc on 21 July 1479.

=== Conflicts in Bohemia ===
The Peace of Olomouc enabled the Catholic noblemen who had supported Matthias to return to Bohemia. Vladislaus, who remained a Catholic, decided to strengthen the position of the Catholics in his realm because he needed the support of the Holy See to strengthen his position in Europe. Although he was unable to achieve the restoration of the Roman Catholic Archdiocese of Prague, he began replacing the Hussite members of the town councils with Catholic burghers. Two sons of Vladislaus's predecessor, Jindřich and Hynek of Poděbrady, also converted to Catholicism.

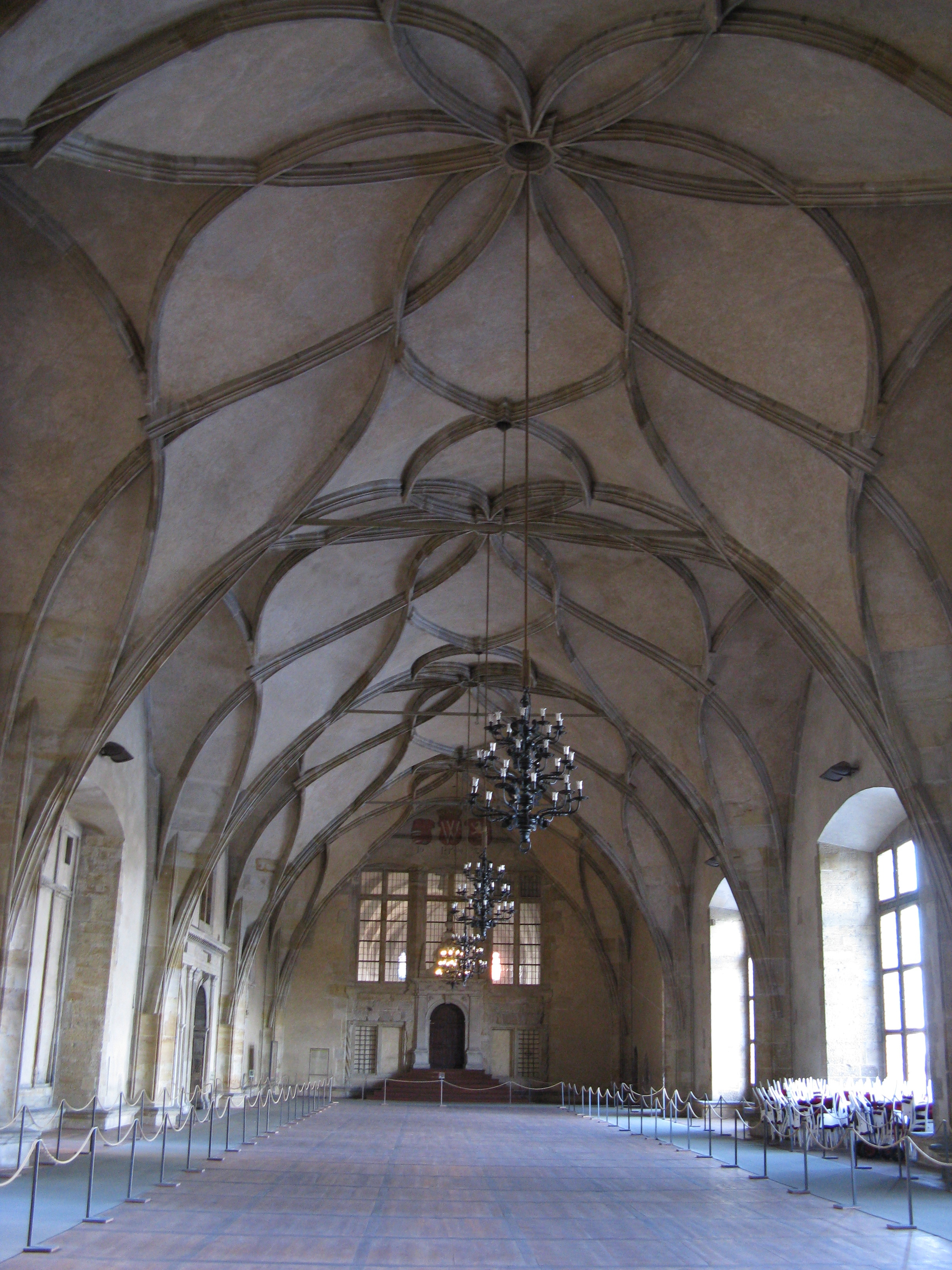
Vladislav Hall within the Prague Castle

Vladislaus's campaign for re-Catholicisation stirred up the Hussites, and the townspeople in Prague rose up in September 1483. The rebels murdered or expelled all Catholic clerics and aldermen and persecuted the Germans and Jews. Vladislaus was also forced to leave the capital. Similar rebellions broke out in Nymburk, Žatec and Hradec Králové. After realizing that he could not send forces against Prague, Vladislaus acknowledged that he was unable to continue his pro-Catholic policy and confirmed the new Hussite aldermen in 1484. Vladislaus had a close relationship with the Jewish community, including employing Jewish people such as Abraham of Bohemia.

The success of the revolt of the burghers of Prague brought about a between the moderate Hussite and Catholic noblemen who treated the townspeople with disdain. Vladislaus also urged the noblemen to reach an agreement on religious matters. Their compromise was confirmed at the Diet in Kutná Hora in March 1485, with acknowledging the right of both noblemen and commoners to freely adhere either to Catholicism or to Utraquism during the following 31 years.

Frederick III failed to invite Vladislaus and Matthias to the Imperial Diet at Frankfurt, where his son, Maximilian, was elected King of the Romans on 16 February 1486. Frederick's omission offended both kings of Bohemia who made an alliance against the emperor at a meeting in Jihlava on 11 September. The meeting also created an opportunity to discuss other issues of common interest, especially the circulation of money in their realms. Vladislaus pledged to send reinforcements to Matthias to fight against Frederick III, but his advisors convinced him not to keep his promise. The Diet of Bohemia also urged him to make peace with the emperor and the prince-electors in June 1487. In the same year, Pope Innocent VIII lifted the excommunication and recognized Vladislaus as king of Bohemia.

Matthias Corvinus confiscated large estates in his realms and granted them to his illegitimate son, John Corvinus, because he wanted to make John his heir. The sons of George of Poděbrady were among the barons who lost their estates to John Corvinus, which annoyed Vladislaus because some estates were located in the Lands of the Bohemian Crown. Vladislaus sought his father's assistance, and they made a formal alliance against Matthias on 23 April 1487. Matthias forced Jan II of Żagań to renounce Głogów in favor of John Corvinus in spring 1489. Before long, Vladislaus made peace with Emperor Frederick, but the emperor's son, Maximilian, started peace negotiations with Matthias.

=== War for Hungary ===
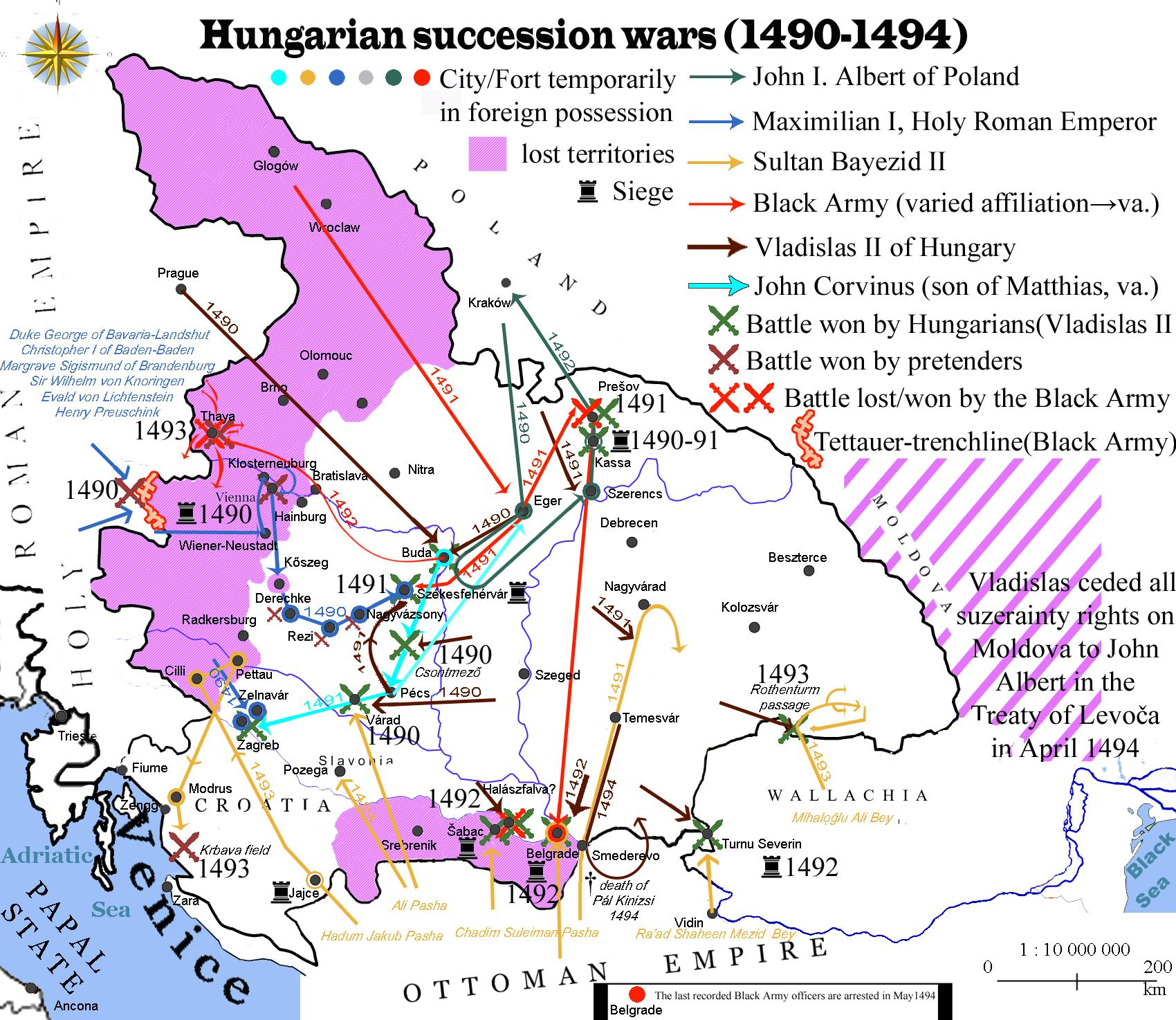
Succession wars in Hungary after the death of Matthias Corvinus (Vladislas marked dark red)

Matthias Corvinus died unexpectedly in Vienna on 6 April 1490. By the time the noblemen assembled to elect his successor in May, four candidates laid claim to the throne. John Corvinus was primarily supported by barons and prelates who owned estates along the southern frontier (including Lawrence Újlaki and Peter Váradi, Archbishop of Kalocsa). Maximilian of Austria referred to the 1463 Peace Treaty of Wiener Neustadt, which prescribed that Emperor Frederick or his heirs were to inherit Hungary if Matthias died without a legitimate heir. Vladislaus claimed Hungary as the eldest son of the sister of Matthias's predecessor, Ladislaus the Posthumous. However, his parents, who wanted to secure a separate realm for each of their sons, proposed Vladislaus's younger brother, John Albert.

Most Hungarian barons and prelates preferred Vladislaus, because his rule in Bohemia had indicated that he would respect their liberties. Vladislaus also pledged that he would marry Matthias's wealthy widow, Beatrice of Naples, after his coronation. His two supporters, Stephen Báthory and Paul Kinizsi, defeated John Corvinus on 4 July. The Diet of Hungary elected Vladislaus king on 15 July 1490. Vladislaus who had left Prague for Hungary in late June issued a charter promising to refrain from imposing extraordinary taxes or introducing other "harmful novelties" and to closely cooperate with the Royal Council. He reached Buda (the capital of Hungary) on 9 August. He met his brother, who had marched as far as Pest on the opposite side of the Danube River, but they did not reach a compromise.

Vladislaus was crowned king on 18 September 1490 in Székesfehérvár. In accordance with the promise he made after his election, he settled in Buda. In his absence, Bohemia was administered by the great officers of state, especially the Burgrave of Prague and the Chancellor. Moravia, Silesia and Lusatia had acknowledged his rule soon after Matthias Corvinus's death. Although Vladislaus pledged that the three provinces would be attached to the Hungarian Crown until the money stipulated in the Peace of Olomouc was paid to the Hungarian treasury, the Estates of the Bohemian Crown argued that the personal union under his rule made that stipulation void. The 400,000 gold florins were never paid.

John Albert did not renounce Hungary after Vladislaus's coronation. He captured Eger and laid siege to Kassa (Košice in Slovakia) in September. Vladislaus married Beatrice of Naples in Esztergom on 4 October, but the marriage was kept secret, although she gave considerable funds to him to finance his campaigns for Hungary. Maximilian of Austria also invaded Hungary and seized Szombathely, Veszprém and Székesfehérvár by the end of November. Vladislaus's supporters relieved Kassa in early December, and Maximilian withdrew from Hungary before the end of the year, because he could not finance his campaign. John Albert renounced his claim to Hungary in exchange for the Duchy of Głogów and the suzerainty over half of Silesia on 20 February 1491. John Albert again broke into Hungary in autumn, but Stephen Zápolya forced him to withdraw.

Vladislaus's troops had meanwhile expelled the army of Maximilian of Austria from Hungary. In the Peace of Pressburg, signed on 7 November 1491, Vladislaus renounced all territories that Matthias Corvinus had conquered in Austria and also acknowledged the Habsburgs' right to inherit Hungary and Bohemia if he died without a son. Stephen Zápolya routed John Albert at Eperjes (Prešov in Slovakia) on 24 December, forcing him to abandon his claim to Hungary.

=== New regime in Hungary ===
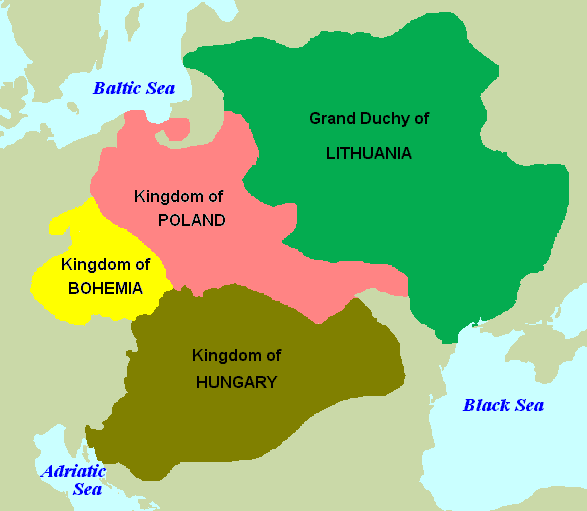
Jagiellonian Europe in the late 15th century

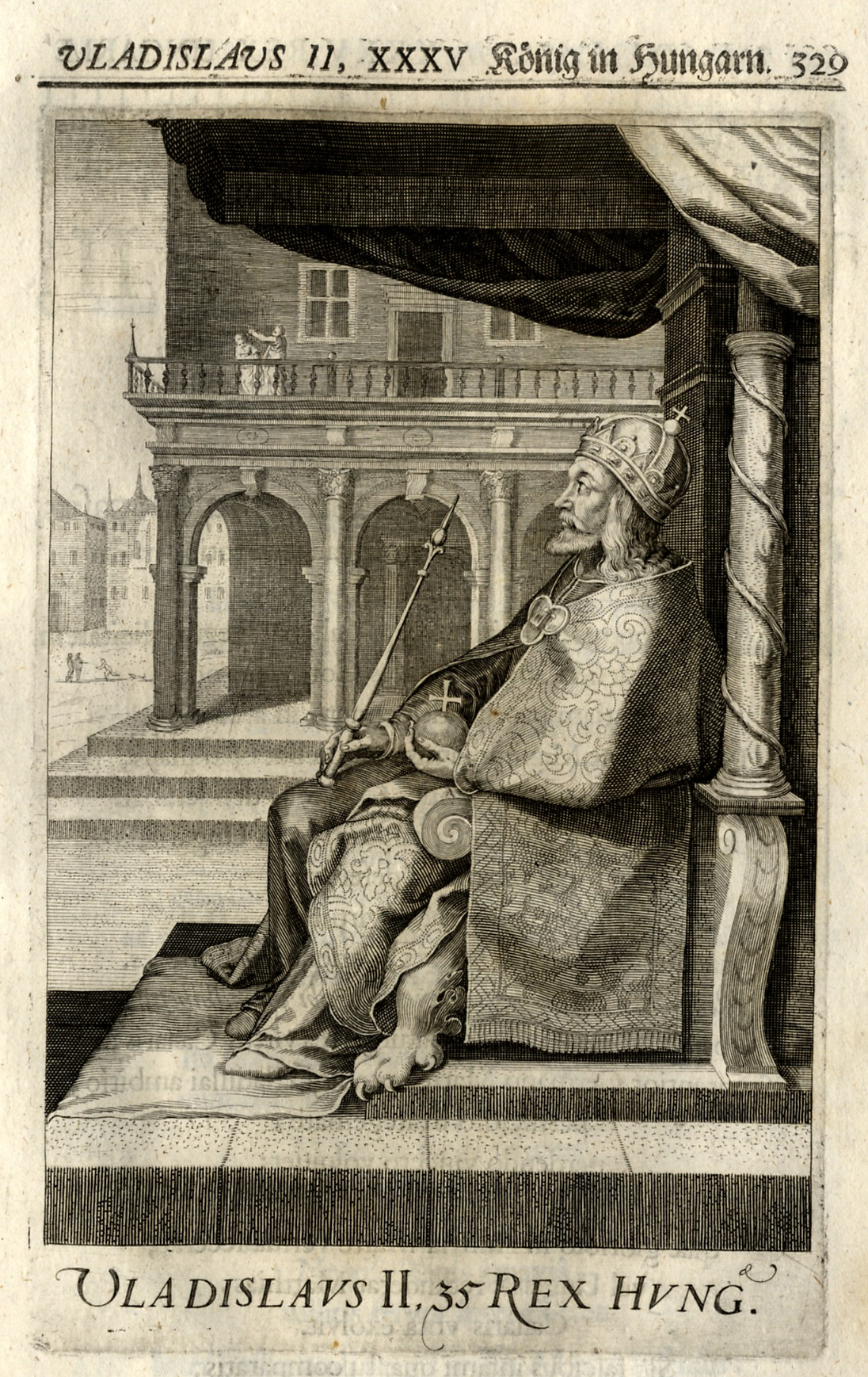
King Vladislaus II of Hungary (Nádasdy Mausoleum, 1664)

Although John Filipec, Bishop of Várad, warned Vladislaus that the Hungarians could only be "forced to obedience with a rod of iron", Vladislaus did not (and could not) continue Matthias Corvinus's centralizing policies. Almost all important decisions were made collectively in the Royal Council and Vladislaus always accepted them, saying Dobrze ("Very well" in Polish), which is the origin of his nickname. Thomas Bakócz and Stephen Zápolya were his most influential advisors in the 1490s. The Diet of Hungary which had been convoked only five times during the last thirteen years of Matthias Corvinus's rule regained its importance. The first Diet assembled in early 1492. It only ratified the Peace of Pressburg after most noblemen who had attained the first sessions returned home, because they accused the authors of the treaty of treachery for renouncing Matthias's conquests.

Casimir IV died on 7 June 1492 after bequeathing Poland and Lithuania to Vladislaus's younger brothers, John Albert and Alexander, respectively. Vladislaus laid claim to Poland, but the Polish noblemen elected John Albert king on 27 August. Vladislaus had inherited an almost empty treasury from Matthias and he was unable to raise money to finance his predecessor's Black Army (a standing army of mercenaries). The unpaid mercenaries rose up and pillaged several villages along the Sava River. Paul Kinizsi routed them in September. Most mercenaries were executed and Vladislaus dissolved the remnants of the army on 3 January 1493.

The Ottomans began to make regular raids against Hungary along the southern border. An Ottoman army inflicted a crushing defeat on the united army of the leading Croatian barons in the Battle of Krbava Field on 11 September 1493. The Ottomans annexed the Adriatic coast to the north of the river Neretva as far as Omiš. A few months later, the Croatian noblemen assembled at Bihać and tried to seek assistance from Pope Alexander VI and Maximilian of Habsburg.

Nevertheless, Vladislaus was still regarded as the head of a powerful state, especially because he and his two brothers ruled the most powerful states in Central Europe. They met in Lőcse (Levoča in Slovakia) in April 1494 to achieve a common foreign policy, but Vladislaus and John Albert did not reach a compromise about Moldavia and Silesia. Vladislaus levied an extraordinary tax, or "subsidy", without the authorization of the Diet in spring 1494. The noblemen protested against the tax all over the kingdom. Lawrence Újlaki, who was one of the wealthiest barons in Hungary, ordered the murder of a tax-collector and called Vladislaus an ox. Vladislaus accused Újlaki of co-operation with the Ottomans and launched a military campaign against him, compelling him to beg for mercy in early 1495. Újlaki was allowed to retain his most estates. The representatives of Vladislaus and the Ottoman Sultan Bayezid II signed a truce for three years in April 1495, but Ottoman raids across the borders continued in Croatia.

The Estates accused Vladislaus's treasurer, Sigismund Ernuszt, of embezzlement at the Diet in May 1496. At the Diet's demand, Vladislaus ordered the arrest of Ernuszt and his deputy. Ernuszt was released only after paying a ransom of 400,000 gold florins.

Vladislaus visited Bohemia in the first half of 1497. After his return, the Diet persuaded him to forbid the unpopular Tamás Bakócz to use the royal seals, but Bakócz remained the arch-chancellor. The royal seals were entrusted to George Szatmári, who was the Thurzós' close ally. Pope Alexander made Bakócz Archbishop of Esztergom on 20 December 1497.

=== Ottoman threat ===
A map of the territorial expansion of the Ottoman Empire

Vladislaus rewarded the Estates of Slavonia (the "shield of Hungary" against the Ottomans) with a separate coat-of-arms at the end of 1497. The truce with the Ottoman Empire came to an end in 1498. The 1498 Diet of Hungary sanctioned the introduction of a one-florin ordinary tax, stipulating that the landowners could retain half of the tax to pay their own retainers. A decree obliged the wealthiest barons and prelates to set up their own armies. Another decree prescribed that the Royal Council could only make decisions if at least eight elected noble jurors of the royal courts attained the meeting. The Diet also passed laws that increased the noblemen's income at the expense of Church revenues and limited the economic privileges of the towns and townspeople.

Vladislaus made an alliance with John Albert and Stephen III of Moldavia against the Ottomans in Kraków on 20 July 1498. He was also reconciled with John Corvinus and made him ban of Croatia, tasking him with the defense of Croatia.

During his reign (1490–1516), the Hungarian royal power declined in favour of the Hungarian magnates, who used their power to curtail the peasants’ freedom. His reign in Hungary was largely stable, although Hungary was under consistent border pressure from the Ottoman Empire and went through the revolt of György Dózsa. On 11 March 1500, the Bohemian Diet adopted a new land constitution that limited royal power, and Vladislav signed it in 1502 (hence it is known as Vladislav land order). Additionally, he oversaw the construction (1493–1502) of the enormous Vladislav Hall atop the palace at the Prague Castle.

=== Death ===
Vladislaus died on 13 March 1516, two weeks after his 60th birthday, in the city of Buda. His funeral was held six days later in the main cathedral of the city of Székesfehérvár, where all the Kings of Hungary used to be buried. His son was previously crowned as King of Hungary in 1508 and in 1509 as King of Bohemia before his father died, so the succession was assured. Before he died, Vladislaus called Tamás Bakócz, John Bornemissza, and his nephew George, Margrave of Brandenburg-Ansbach, and named them the bearers and custodians of the young prince Louis. The monarch left a Kingdom in political ruins with a debt of 403,000 Hungarian florins.

== Family ==
Ancestors of Vladislaus II

8. Algirdas
4. Władysław II Jagiełło
9. Uliana of Tver
2. Casimir IV Jagiellon
10. Andrzej Holszański
5. Sophia of Halshany
11. Alexandra Dimitrijewna of Drutsk
1. Vladislaus II, King of Hungary and Bohemia
12. Albert IV, Duke of Austria
6. Albert II of Germany
13. Johanna Sophia of Bavaria
3. Elisabeth of Habsburg
14. Sigismund, Holy Roman Emperor
7. Elizabeth of Luxembourg
15. Barbara of Celje

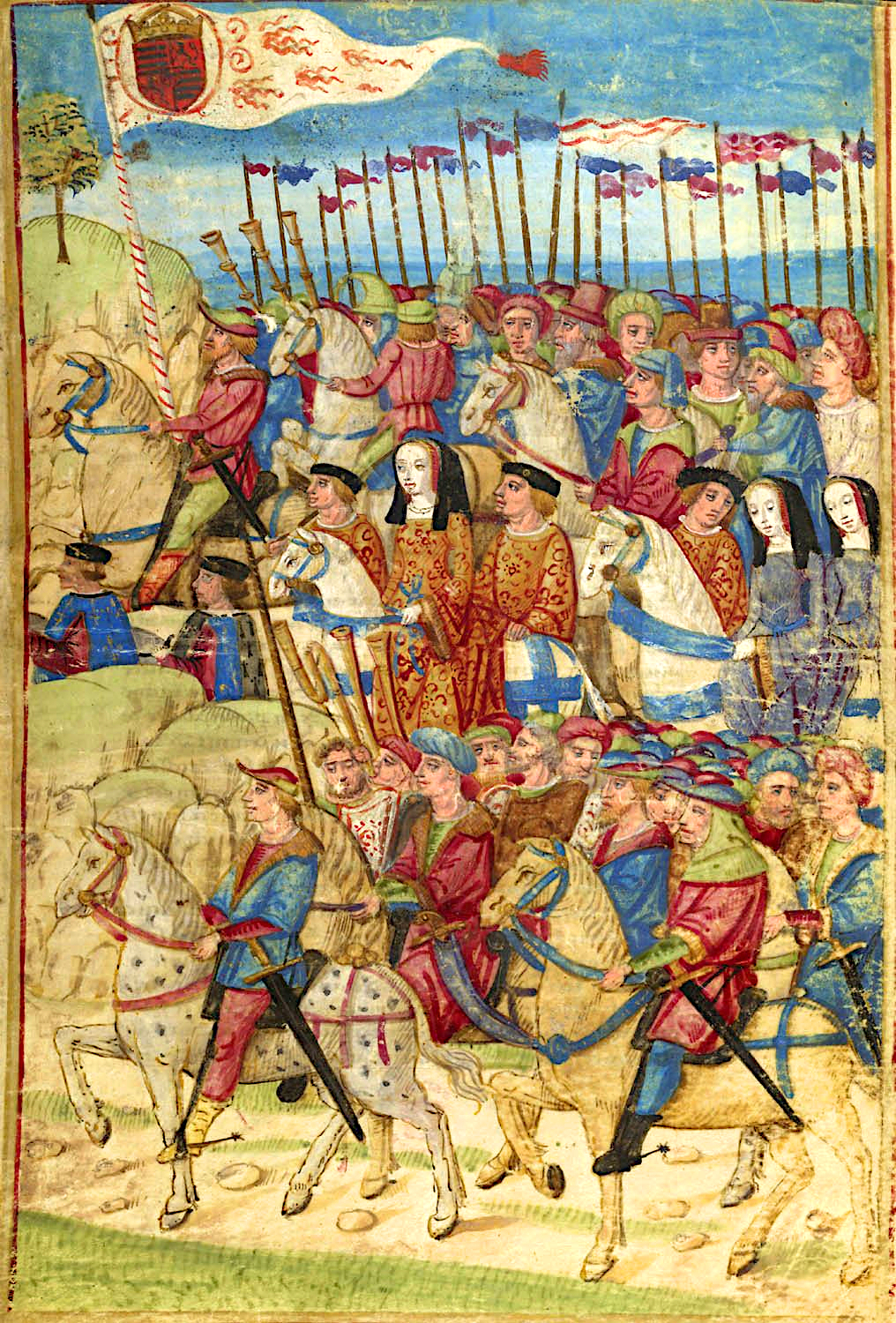
Anne of Foix with her entourage on horseback

Vladislaus II was married three times, the first time in 1476 at Frankfurt/Oder to Barbara of Brandenburg, daughter of Albrecht III Achilles, Elector of Brandenburg, child widow of Silesian Piast Henry XI of Głogów. His second wife was Beatrice of Naples, the widow of King Matthias, who was a daughter of Ferdinand I of Naples. His third wife, Anne of Foix, was crowned on 29 September 1502 when she was about 18 years old and he was 46. She gave birth to his only two surviving legitimate children, Anne of Bohemia and Hungary and Louis II of Hungary and Bohemia, and died in 1506 from complications resulting from the birth of Louis.

After his death, Vladislaus' ten-year-old son Louis succeeded him on the thrones of both Bohemia and Hungary. His daughter Anna was married in 1515 to the future emperor Ferdinand of Austria, a grandson of Emperor Maximilian I. Therefore, after the death of Louis at the Battle of Mohács, the succession devolved through Anna to the cadet line of eastern Habsburgs.

== Titles ==
His titles according to the laws in 1492: King of Hungary, Bohemia, Dalmatia, Croatia, Slavonia, Rama, Serbia, Galicia, Lodomeria, Cumania and Bulgaria, Prince of Silesia and Luxembourg, Margrave of Moravia and Upper-/Lower Lusatia.

== See also ==
- List of rulers of Bohemia
- List of rulers of Hungary

== Sources ==
- "Dózsa Rebellion". Home > World History > Wars, Battles & Armed Conflicts. Britannica.
- Bartl, Július; Čičaj, Viliam; Kohútova, Mária; Letz, Róbert; Segeš, Vladimír; Škvarna, Dušan (2002). Slovak History: Chronology & Lexicon. Bolchazy-Carducci Publishers, Slovenské Pedegogické Nakladatel'stvo. ISBN 0-86516-444-4.
- Boubín, Jaroslav (2011). "The Bohemian Crownlands under the Jagiellons (1471–1526)". In Pánek, Jaroslav; Tůma, Oldřich (eds.). A History of the Czech Lands. Charles University in Prague. pp. 173–187. ISBN 978-80-246-1645-2.
- Buchvaldek, Miroslav (1987). Československé dějiny v datech (in Czech) (2nd ed.). Prague: Svoboda. OCLC 914813165.
- Cazacu, Matei (2017). Reinert, Stephen W. (ed.). Dracula. Brill.
- de Sousa, Antonio Caetano (1735). Historia genealogica da casa real portugueza (in Portuguese). Lisbon: Lisboa Occidental. p. 147.
- Engel, Pál (2001). The Realm of St Stephen: A History of Medieval Hungary, 895–1526. I.B. Tauris Publishers. ISBN 1-86064-061-3.
- Frost, Robert (2015). The Oxford History of Poland-Lithuania, Volume I: The Making of the Polish-Lithuanian Union, 1385–1569. Oxford University Press. ISBN 978-0-19-820869-3.
- Kontler, László (1999). Millennium in Central Europe: A History of Hungary. Atlantisz Publishing House. ISBN 963-9165-37-9.
- Krones, Franz von (1877). "Elisabeth (deutsche Königin)" . Allgemeine Deutsche Biographie (in German). Vol. 6. Leipzig: Duncker & Humblot. pp. 9–11.
- Krones, Franz von (1875). "Albrecht IV. (Herzog von Österreich)" . Allgemeine Deutsche Biographie (in German). Vol. 1. Leipzig: Duncker & Humblot. pp. 283–285.
- Kubinyi, András (2002). "II. Ulászló". In Kristó, Gyula (ed.). Magyarország vegyes házi királyai [The Kings of Various Dynasties of Hungary] (in Hungarian). Szukits Könyvkiadó. pp. 174–188. ISBN 963-9441-58-9.
- Lindner, Theodor (1892). "Sigmund (Kaiser)" . Allgemeine Deutsche Biographie (in German). Vol. 34. Leipzig: Duncker & Humblot. pp. 267–282.
- Macek, Josef (1998). "The monarchy of the estates". In Teich, Mikuláš (ed.). Bohemia in History. Cambridge University Press. pp. 98–116. ISBN 0-521-43155-7.
- Magaš, Branka (2007). Croatia Through History. SAQI. ISBN 978-0-86356-775-9.
- Quirin, Heinz (1953a). "Albrecht II.". Neue Deutsche Biographie (in German). Vol. 1. Berlin: Duncker & Humblot. pp. 154–155. (full text online).
- Quirin, Heinz (1953b). "Barbara von Cilly". Neue Deutsche Biographie (in German). Vol. 1. Berlin: Duncker & Humblot. p. 581. (full text online).
- Rowell, S. C. (1994). Lithuania Ascending: A Pagan Empire within East-Central Europe, 1295–1345. Cambridge University Press. ISBN 0-521-45011-X.
- Šmahel, František (2011). "The Hussite Revolution (1419–1471)". In Pánek, Jaroslav; Tůma, Oldřich (eds.). A History of the Czech Lands. Charles University in Prague. pp. 149–169. ISBN 978-80-246-1645-2.
- Szakály, Ferenc (1981). "A középkori magyar állam virágzása és bukása, 1301–1526: 1490–1526 [Flourishing and Fall of Medieval Hungary, 1301–1526: 1490–1526]". In Solymosi, László (ed.). Magyarország történeti kronológiája, I: a kezdetektől 1526-ig [Historical Chronology of Hungary, Volume I: From the Beginning to 1526] (in Hungarian). Akadémiai Kiadó. pp. 318–350. ISBN 963-05-2661-1.
- Teke, Zsuzsa (1981). "A középkori magyar állam virágzása és bukása, 1301–1526: 1458–1490 [Flourishing and Fall of Medieval Hungary, 1301–1526: 1458–1490]". In Solymosi, László (ed.). Magyarország történeti kronológiája, I: a kezdetektől 1526-ig [Historical Chronology of Hungary, Volume I: From the Beginning to 1526] (in Hungarian). Akadémiai Kiadó. pp. 273–318. ISBN 963-05-2661-1.
- Varga, Szabolcs (2012). "II. Ulászló". In Gujdár, Noémi; Szatmáry, Nóra (eds.). Magyar királyok nagykönyve: Uralkodóink, kormányzóink és az erdélyi fejedelmek életének és tetteinek képes története [Encyclopedia of the Kings of Hungary: An Illustrated History of the Life and Deeds of Our Monarchs, Regents and the Princes of Transylvania] (in Hungarian). Reader's Digest. pp. 144–147. ISBN 978-963-289-214-6.
- Wolf, Armin (1994). "Reigning Queens in Medieval Europe: When, Where, and Why". In Parsons, John Carmi (ed.). Medieval Queenship. Sutton Publishing. pp. 169–188. ISBN 0-7509-1831-4.
- Wurzbach, Constantin von, ed. (1860). "Habsburg, Elisabeth von Oesterreich (Königin von Polen)" . Biographisches Lexikon des Kaiserthums Oesterreich [Biographical Encyclopedia of the Austrian Empire] (in German). Vol. 6. p. 167 – via Wikisource.

Vladislaus II of Hungary House of Jagiellon Born: 1 March 1456 Died: 13 March 1516
Regnal titles
Preceded by George	King of Bohemia; 1471–1516	Succeeded by Louis (II)
Preceded by Matthias I	King of Hungary and Croatia; 1490–1516	Succeeded by Louis (II)
