= Henryk XI =

Henryk XI may refer to

- Henry XI, Duke of Głogów (ca. 1435 – 1476)
- Henry XI, Duke of Legnica (1539–1588)
