= Dorothea of Brandenburg (1471–1520) =

Dorothea of Brandenburg (12 May 1471 in Berlin – 13 February 1520 in Bamberg) was a Princess of Brandenburg and Abbess of the Poor Clares Convent in Bamberg.

== Life ==
Dorothea was a daughter of the Elector of Brandenburg, Albrecht Achilles (1414–1486), from his second marriage to Anna (1436–1512), daughter of the Elector Frederick II of Saxony.

At one point, her father considered her as a possible bride for King Vladislaus II of Hungary, who was dissatisfied with his marriage to Dorothea's widowed sister, Barbara. In 1485, Archduke Maximilian also unsuccessfully negotiated with Albrecht Achilles for Dorothea's hand to secure support for his election as king.

Dorothea firstly lived with her mother in Neustadt an der Aisch and later moved to the Poor Clares Convent in Bamberg in 1489 or 1492. She became abbess in 1498. In 1506, she resigned as abbess.

Dorothea was buried in the convent church, and her tombstone depicted her in relief as abbess holding a lily, a book, and a rosary.

== Literature ==
- Gerhard Pfeiffer, Alfred Wendehorst (eds.): Fränkische Lebensbilder (= Publications of the Society for Franconian History, Vol. 12). Degener, 1986, pp. 72 ff.
- Pius Wittmann: Zur Geschichte des St.-Klara-Klosters in Bamberg und dessen Äbtissin Dorothea, Markgräfin von Brandenburg, Tochter des Stammvaters des deutschen Kaiserhauses, Fuller, 1890.
