= Barbara of Brandenburg (1464–1515) =

Queen of Bohemia nominally from 1476

Queen consort of Bohemia
- Tenure: 1476–1490/1500
- Born: 30 May 1464; Ansbach, Brandenburg-Ansbach
- Died: 4 September 1515 (aged 51); Ansbach
- Burial: Heilsbronn
- Spouse: Henry XI, Duke of Głogów; King Vladislaus II of Bohemia
- House: House of Hohenzollern
- Father: Albrecht III, Elector of Brandenburg
- Mother: Anna of Saxony

Barbara of Brandenburg (30 May 1464 – 4 September 1515), a member of the German House of Hohenzollern, was by birth Margravine of Brandenburg, and by her two marriages, Duchess of Głogów from 1472 to 1476, and Queen of Bohemia (although only nominally) after her second marriage from 1476 to 1490/1500 though she never traveled to Bohemia to be crowned and her marriage to King Vladislaus II remained unconsummated.

== Family ==
Barbara of Brandenburg was born in the Hohenzollern residence of Ansbach as the tenth of the nineteen children of Albrecht III Achilles, Elector of Brandenburg; she was the fourth child born from his second marriage to Anna of Saxony, daughter of the Wettin elector Frederick II of Saxony. At the time of her birth, her father ruled the Franconian margraviate of Brandenburg-Ansbach and also inherited the neighbouring Principality of Kulmbach, upon the death of his elder brother Margrave John the Alchemist. In 1471, he succeeded his brother Frederick Irontooth as Elector of Brandenburg.

== First marriage ==
In Berlin on 11 October 1472, eight-year-old Barbara was married to the Silesian Piast Duke Henry XI of Głogów, around thirty years her senior. The marriage contract stipulated that, in case of the duke's death without issue, his Duchy of Głogów was to be passed to his wife, with reversion to her Hohenzollern family. Four years later, on 22 February 1476, Duke Henry XI died suddenly, possibly poisoned by Brandenburg agents. This death left Duchess Barbara of Głogów, with the Duchy of Crossen and Kożuchów, but a long succession war erupted: The Silesian duchy had been a Bohemian fief since 1331, therefore, not only did Henry XI's closest male relative, his cousin Jan II the Mad, former Duke of Żagań, claim the whole inheritance, but also King Vladislaus II of Bohemia and the Anti-King Matthias Corvinus of Hungary. To further complicate the matter, half of the duchy was held by Margareta of Celje, widow of Władysław of Głogów. Immediately after the death of Duke Henry XI, Barbara's father, Elector Albrecht Achilles, had the Duchy of Głogów occupied by Brandenburg troops under the command of his son John Cicero of Brandenburg.

== Queen of Bohemia ==
In the name of his daughter, Elector Albrecht Achilles appointed Otto von Schenk as provincial administrator. Nine months later, Barbara of Brandenburg was married again, this time to King Vladislaus II, who wanted to seize the fief of Głogów to his domains. The wedding, performed by proxy with the Silesian duke Henry I of Münsterberg-Oels acting, took place in the Brandenburg city of Frankfurt (Oder) on 20 August 1476. His furious rival, King Matthias Corvinus, supplied Duke Jan II the Mad with an army to occupy the Głogów lands; however, he was defeated by John Cicero's troops near Crossen in October 1478.

At the end of the succession dispute, Barbara, who counted on the support of the Głogów states, after the violent fights with Duke Jan II, finally obtained the Duchy of Crossen, with the towns of Bobrowice, Sulechów, and Lubsko, pledged to the Electorate of Brandenburg against Barbara's dowry, a sum of 50,000 florins.

Due to war, Barbara couldn't travel to Bohemia for her marriage and coronation in person. Shortly after, King Vladislaus II determined that his unconsummated and only juridical marriage with the Brandenburg princess was useless and began to seek legal separation. This enraged Elector Albert Achilles, who in 1481, obtained a compensation payment; however, with the mediation of the Bishops of Bamberg and Würzburg, he still wanted to continue the marital bond, and even offered his ten-year-old daughter Dorothea of Brandenburg as a replacement to her older sister, if the King did not want Barbara any more. King Vladislaus II refused any other agreement with the House of Hohenzollern, but remained legally married to Barbara although he never saw her.

At the death of King Matthias Corvinus on 6 May 1490, the Bohemian King pursued the Hungarian crown too, and in order to obtain more support for this, he secretly married Corvinus' widow, Beatrice of Naples, on 4 October. After the union became public, this caused a scandal because King Vladislaus II was bigamous. This situation lasted for the next ten years, where he became increasingly desperate for an heir, because his Neapolitan wife was unable to bear him children.

== Last years ==
In the meanwhile, Barbara fought against her family for a divorce from King Vladislaus II; also, she became secretly engaged with the Franconian knight, Conrad of Heideck, in 1493. As a punishment for her independent behavior, Barbara was imprisoned at Plassenburg Castle until Conrad broke off the engagement. Five years later, on 7 April 1500, Pope Alexander VI finally dissolved both marriages of King Vladislaus II. Beatrice of Naples retired to Ischia, where she died eight years later. In 1502, the Bohemian-Hungarian King married Anne of Foix-Candale, relative of the kings of France and Navarre, with whom he finally had children.

Barbara probably remained in Plassenburg without domains or incomes. Without a doubt, she died in her birthplace, Ansbach, on 4 September 1515, aged fifty-one. She was buried in Heilsbronn.

== Ancestors ==
Ancestors of Barbara of Brandenburg (1464–1515)

8. Frederick V, Burgrave of Nuremberg
4. Frederick I, Elector of Brandenburg
9. Elisabeth of Meissen
2. Albrecht III, Elector of Brandenburg
10. Frederick, Duke of Bavaria-Landshut
5. Elisabeth of Bavaria-Landshut
11. Maddalena Visconti
1. Barbara of Brandenburg
12. Frederick I, Elector of Saxony
6. Frederick II, Elector of Saxony
13. Catherine of Brunswick
3. Anna of Saxony
14. Ernest, Duke of Austria
7. Margarete of Austria-Styria
15. Cymburgis of Masovia

Barbara of Brandenburg (1464–1515) House of Hohenzollern Born: 30 May 1464 Died: 4 September 1515
Royal titles
Preceded by Johana of Rožmitál	Queen consort of Bohemia; 1476–1490/1500	Succeeded by Beatrice of Naples
