= Battle of Kratzau =

Coordinates: 50°47′36″N 14°59′51″E

- Part of Hussite Wars
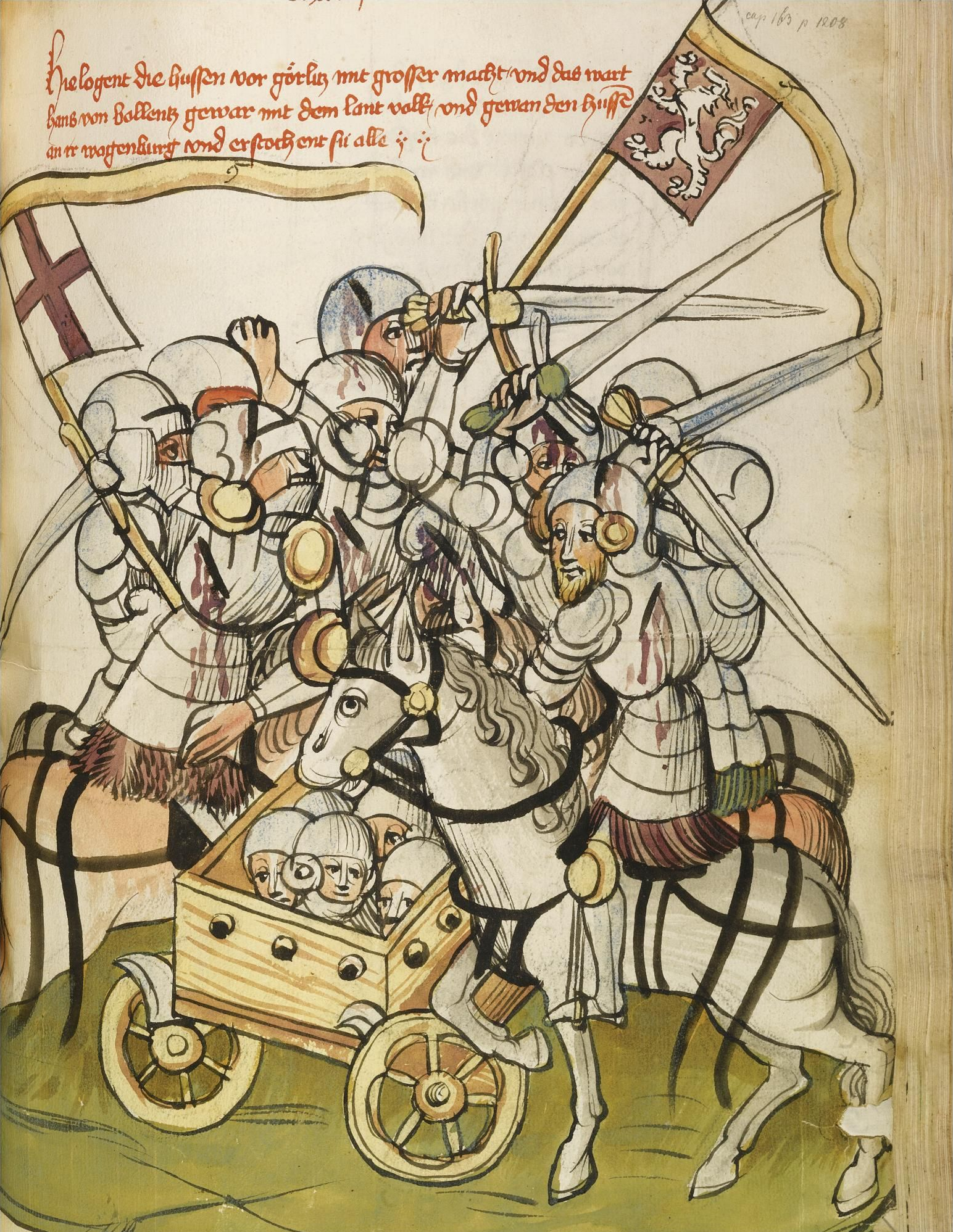
- Hans von Polenz, the captain of the Silesian army, and his forces overwhelming those of the Hussites and their armoured carriages, by Diebold Lauber
Date	11 November 1428
Location	Kratzau, North Bohemia
Result	Imperial victory

Belligerents
Orphans	Upper Lusatia; Lower Lusatia; Duchy of Żagań

Commanders and leaders
Jan Královec	Albert of Koldice; Hans of Polenz; Jan I of Żagań

Casualties and losses
About 400	Unknown

The Battle of Kratzau occurred on 11 November 1428 between an Imperial Silesian army and the Sirotci Hussites in Kratzau, Bohemia. During the battle, the Imperial Silesian army under Hans von Polenz overpowered the Hussite troops. In November 1428, the Hussites under the leadership of Jan Královec launched a campaign from the occupied Kratzau of Friedland and Ostritz to Löbau. The city was not taken by the Hussites, and so they retreated back to Kratzau. Silesian and Lusatia troops pursued the Hussites, defeating them near Kratzau. The loss of vehicles with rations was essential for the Hussites, since supplies were intended for units besieging the Lichnice Castle.
