= Wenceslaus of Żagań =

Wenceslaus
- Duke of Żagań-Przewóz
- Born: 1421/1433
- Died: 29 April 1488
- Noble family: Silesian Piasts of Głogów
- Father: Jan I of Żagań
- Mother: Scholastika of Saxe-Wittenberg

Wenceslaus of Żagań (Polish: Wacław żagański; 1421/1433 – 29 April 1488) was a Duke of Żagań-Przewóz since 1439 (with his brothers as co-rulers until 1449), from 1449 Duke of Przewóz (as co-ruler of his younger brother).

He was the third son of Duke Jan I of Żagań by his wife Scholastika, daughter of Rudolf III, Duke of Saxe-Wittenberg and Elector of Saxony. He was born after 1420 and before 1434.

== Life ==
After his father's death in 1439 Wenceslaus inherited the Duchy of Żagań-Przewóz jointly with his older brothers, Balthasar and Rudolf and his younger brother Jan II the Mad.

In 1449, the Duchy was divided in two parts: Żagań and Przewóz. Wenceslaus received Przewóz together with his brother Jan II as a co-ruler. Because of his mental illness, Wenceslaus didn't participate in the political life. In 1454 Jan II became Wenceslaus's legal guardian and was obliged to ensure him an adequate lifestyle. In 1472, when Jan II sold the Duchy of Żagań to the rulers of Saxony, Ernest and Albert, Wenceslaus received 2,100 florins as a pension.

In 1476 Wenceslaus renounced to his claims over the Duchy of Głogów for a rent of 400 guilders and moved to Wrocław, where he entered the monastery of St. Barbara. There he actively participated in the religious life of the city. In 1478 he made a will in which enrolled his property and rents for the construction of the church of St. Barbara. He died on 29 April 1488. After his death he was buried in the church, which he founded.

Preceded by Jan I	Duke of Żagań; 1439–1449; With: Balthasar, Rudolf and Jan II	Succeeded by Balthasar and Rudolf
Preceded by Jan I	Duke of Przewóz; 1439–1472; With: Balthasar, Rudolf (until 1449) and Jan II	Succeeded by Annexed by the House of Wettin
