= Rudolf of Żagań =

Rudolf
- Duke of Żagań-Przewóz
- Born: 1411-1418
- Died: 17 September 1454; Chojnice
- Noble family: Silesian Piasts of Głogów
- Father: Jan I of Żagań
- Mother: Scholastika of Saxe-Wittemberg

Rudolf of Żagań (Polish: Rudolf żagański) (ca. 1418 – 18 September 1454) was a Duke of Żagań-Przewóz since 1439 (with his brothers as co-rulers until 1449), from 1449 Duke of Żagań (as co-ruler of his older brother).

He was the second son of Duke Jan I of Żagań by his wife Scholastika, daughter of Rudolf III, Duke of Saxe-Wittemberg and Elector of Saxony. He was named after his maternal grandfather.

Rudolf was born between 1411 and 1418.

== Life ==
At the time of his father's death (1439), Rudolf inherited the Duchy of Żagań-Przewóz jointly with his older brother Balthasar and his younger brothers Wenceslaus and Jan II the Mad.

In 1449 the Duchy was divided in two parts: Żagań and Przewóz. Rudolf and Balthasar received Żagań as co-rulers while Przewóz was given to Jan II and Wenceslaus also as co-rulers.

In 1450 Rudolf went along with his older brother on a pilgrimage to Rome. Here, he vowed to fight for the Christian faith, evidencing his strong religious beliefs. This is also confirmed by the written sources, specifically in the "Chronicle Żagań Abbots" (Kronika opatów żagańskich), where he is defined as a pious man.

In 1454 he participated in the Thirteen Years' War at the side of the Teutonic Order. With approximately 1,900 soldiers and horses he went to Świdwin. He wasn't the only Silesian ruler fighting on the Teutonic side. Together with the Bohemian leader Bernard Szumborski (Bernhard von Zinneberg) he fought in the Battle of Chojnice, where the Poles suffered a complete defeat. In the battle almost 3,000 Polish were killed, and about 300 knights were captured. Rudolf didn't survive the battle: he died on 17 September 1454 in his initial phase, facing the charge of the strong Polish cavalry. It is unknown where he was buried.

After his death without issue (he never married), his older brother Balthasar assumed the full sovereignty over Żagań. This unilateral decision left their younger brother Jan II bitterly disappointed and caused later his further revolts against Balthasar.

== Footnotes ==
Preceded by Jan I	Duke of Żagań; 1439–1454; With: Balthasar, Wenceslaus and Jan II (until 1449)	Succeeded by Balthasar
Preceded by Jan I	Duke of Przewóz; 1439–1449; With: Balthasar, Wenceslaus and Jan II	Succeeded by Wenceslaus and Jan II the Mad
