= Assumption of the Blessed Virgin Mary Church, Żagań =

Church in Żagań, Poland

Assumption of the Blessed Virgin Mary Church
- Kościół Wniebowzięcia Najświętszej Maryi Panny
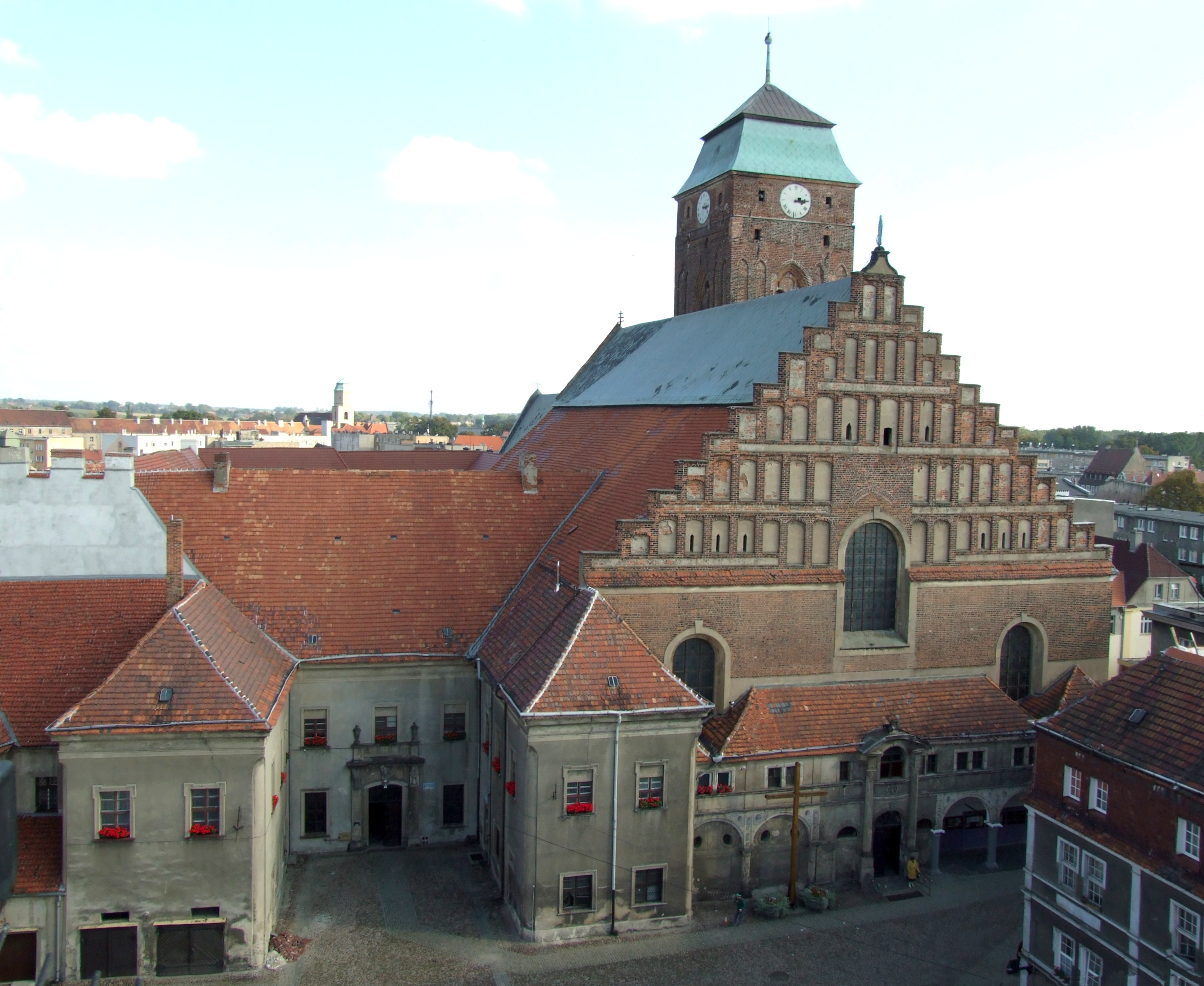
- Assumption of the Blessed Virgin Mary Church

- 51.3656°N 15.1908°E
- Location: Żagań
- Country: Poland
- Language: Polish
- Denomination: Roman Catholic
- Website: Official Website

History
- Status: Parish church
- Dedication: Assumption of Mary

Architecture
- Functional status: Active
- Heritage designation: Historic Monument of Poland
- Designated: 28 February 2011
- Style: Gothic
- Groundbreaking: 14th century
- Completed: 15th century

Administration
- Diocese: Roman Catholic Diocese of Zielona Góra-Gorzów
- Deanery: Żagań

Assumption of the Blessed Virgin Mary Church in Żagań, Poland, is a Gothic church built between the fourteenth and fifteenth century. The church is part of the Roman Catholic Diocese of Zielona Góra-Gorzów. It is listed as a Historic Monument of Poland.

It is one of the burial sites of the Piast dynasty, including Henry IV the Faithful, Henry V of Iron, Henry VII Rumpold, Henry VIII the Sparrow, Jan I of Żagań, Balthasar of Żagań.
