= Battle of Chojnice (1454) =

Part of the Thirteen Years' War

Coordinates: 53°42′00″N 17°34′00″E

- Part of the Thirteen Years' War
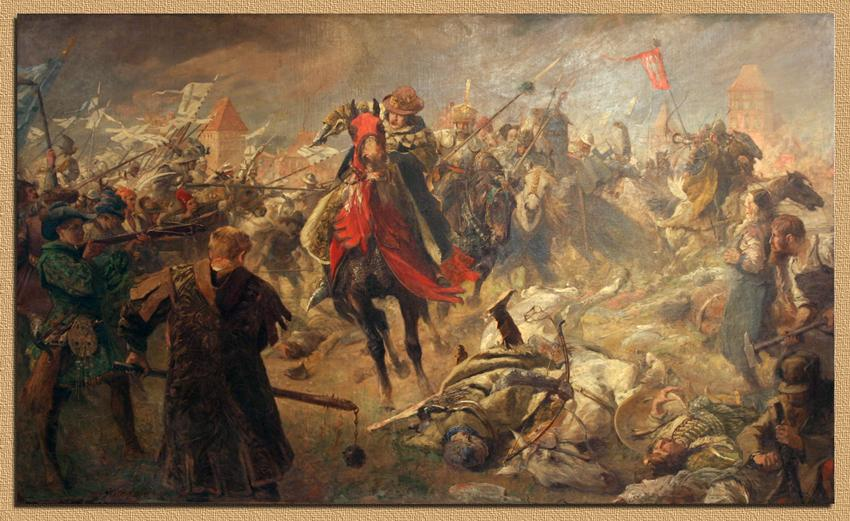
Date	18 September 1454
Location	Near Chojnice, Gdańsk Pomerania, Teutonic State (now in Pomeranian Voivodeship, Poland)
Result	Teutonic Victory

Belligerents
Polish Crown; Prussian Confederation	Teutonic Order; Duchy of Żagań

Commanders and leaders
King Casimir IV; Jan Taszka Koniecpolski; Piotr of Szczekociny †	Bernhard von Zinnenberg; Rudolf of Żagań †

Strength
16,000 cavalry, over 3,000 infantry	9,000 cavalry 6,000 infantry

Casualties and losses
Over 3,000 killed 300 knights captured around 2000 troops captured overall	~100 killed

The Battle of Chojnice (or Battle of Konitz) occurred on 18 September 1454 near the town of Chojnice, between Poland and the Teutonic Knights during the Thirteen Years' War. The battle was won by the Teutonic Knights.

== Background ==
The Teutonic army had around 9,000 cavalry and 6,000 infantry under Bernhard von Zinnenberg. The Polish army had 16,000 cavalry, a few thousand servants (who could and usually were used in battles), a few hundred infantry, plus 500 mercenaries and burghers from Gdańsk and 2,000 mercenaries hired by the Prussian Confederacy, all under the command of King Casimir IV, advised by chancellor Jan Koniecpolski and Piotr of Szczekociny.

The Polish commanders were counting on the battle being won by the Polish heavy cavalry, not caring much about either artillery or infantry. They had not thought that their opponents could change their traditional strategy, or that the Teutonic soldiers besieged in Chojnice could be anything more than spectators. Bernard von Zinnenberg, nonetheless, had planned a totally different kind of battle.

== Battle ==
At the beginning everything went as expected, following the pattern of many other battles between the Poles and Teutonic Knights. The Polish cavalry charged, breaking the Teutonic lines, killing Duke Rudolf of Sagan and even capturing Bernhard von Zinnenberg. The Teutonic cavalry tried to break through the Polish lines and escape to Chojnice; however, infantry grouped at the Teutonic Wagenburg broke with tradition and offered a very good defense against the mounted troops.

Then a sudden sally from Chojnice at the back of the Polish army caused panic. Bernhard von Zinnenberg managed to release himself and organised the pursuit; hundreds of Poles, including Piotr of Szczekociny, were killed during the rout or drowned in nearby marshland. The Polish King fought on with great personal courage and his knights had to force him to leave the battlefield.

== Aftermath ==
The Polish defeat was complete. 3,000 bodies were left on the battlefield, 300 knights were captured by the Teutonic Knights, including three main commanders: Mikolaj Szarlejski, Łukasz Górka, and Vojtěch Kostka of Postupice. The Teutonic Knights lost only around 100 men. Bernhard von Zinnenberg, was however, formally a Polish prisoner, since he gave a knight's word.

== Bibliography ==
- Jacek Knopek, Bogdan Kuffel: Bitwa pod Chojnicami 18 IX 1454 r. w tradycji historycznej i regionalnej. Chojnice: Biblioteka Chojnicka, 2004.
