= Balthasar of Żagań =

Duke of Żagań

Balthasar
- Duke of Żagań-Przewóz
- Born: c. 1415
- Died: 15 July 1472
- Noble family: Silesian Piasts of Głogów
- Spouses: Agnes; Barbara of Cieszyn
- Issue: Anna
- Father: Jan I of Żagań
- Mother: Scholastika of Saxe-Wittemberg

Balthasar, Duke of Żagań (Polish: Baltazar żagański; c. 1415 – Przewóz, 15 July 1472), was a Duke of Żagań-Przewóz since 1439 (with his brothers as co-rulers until 1449), from 1449 Duke of Żagań. Deposed during 1461–1468, he recovered the Duchy in this year until shortly before his death.

He was the oldest son of Duke Jan I of Żagań by his wife Scholastika, daughter of Rudolf III, Duke of Saxe-Wittemberg and Elector of Saxony. He was named after his maternal great-grandfather, Balthasar, Landgrave of Thuringia (Scholastika's maternal grandfather).

== Life ==
After his father's death in 1439, he inherited the Duchy of Żagań with his younger brothers Rudolf, Wenceslaus and Jan II the Mad. In 1449 the Duchy was divided into two districts: Żagań and Przewóz. Balthasar and Rudolf received Żagań as co-rulers while Przewóz was given to Jan II and Wenceslaus, also as co-rulers.

In 1450, together with Rudolf, Balthasar went on a pilgrimage to Rome. Shortly after his return, he had to face the claims of his brother Jan II who, dissatisfied with the part of the lands which had received, asked the review of the divisionary treaty. The dispute was settled amicably in 1453, thanks to the mediation of their uncle, Frederick of Saxony.

In 1454 Rudolf was killed during the Thirteen Years' War in the Battle of Chojnice, fighting at the side of the Teutonic Knights. After his death, Balthasar went to Prussia (Polish region), fighting on the Teutonic side and trying to gain a lieutenancy. Without obtaining this position, he returned to Żagań in 1457. On his return, he found a complicated situation, as Jan II established himself as a Governor of the Duchy during his absence, and forced the Żagań states to paid homage to him.

In the following years Balthasar was involved in the Silesian political affairs, directly against George of Poděbrady, King of Bohemia. In 1461 his brother Jan II, with the help of troops given by the Bohemian King, invaded Żagań. Balthasar was forced to escape.

During 1461–1467 Balthasar lived in exile in Wrocław, where he led the urban army. After having unsuccessfully appealed to King George for the recovery of his domains, he went to Rome, where he obtained the support of Pope Pius II. In 1467 a Crusade against the "Hussite King" (as a reference to the Bohemian King) was organized and, with the Papal support, he was appointed the Supreme Commander. However, the expedition failed after Balthasar's defeat by Jan II in Kożuchów.

It was only in 1468 when Balthasar regained the government over Żagań, thanks to the help of his cousin, Duke Henry XI of Głogów.

During the war between Matthias Corvinus and George of Poděbrady, he was at the side of the Hungarian King. In 1469 he paid homage as a vassal of Hungary. However, soon the Hungarian King began to support Jan II against him.

In 1472 Jan II invaded again Żagań and took control over the government. Balthasar was captured and imprisoned in the castle of Przewóz, where -according to some sources- he was starved to death by order of his brother. This happened on 15 July 1472. He was buried in the Ducal mausoleum in the Augustinian church of Żagań.

== Marriages and issue ==
Balthasar's first wife was Agnes (d. 28 August 1460), whose origins are unknown. Their only child, a daughter, Anna, died young in 1463.

On 11 September 1469 Balthasar married secondly with Barbara (1449/53 – bef. 12 May 1507), daughter of Duke Bolesław II of Cieszyn. This union, who, as recorded the chronicles, caused his "brother's anger", remained childless. After the death of his husband, Barbara was forced to return her homeland Cieszyn.

Balthasar of Żagań House of Piast Born: c. 1415 Died: 15 July 1472
Preceded by Jan I	Duke of Żagań; 1439–1461; With: Rudolf (until 1454), Wenceslaus and Jan II (until 1449)	Succeeded by Jan II the Mad
Preceded by Jan I	Duke of Przewóz; 1439–1449; With: Rudolf, Wenceslaus and Jan II	Succeeded by Wenceslaus and Jan II the Mad
Preceded by Jan II the Mad	Duke of Żagań; 1468–1472	Succeeded by Jan II the Mad
