= Jan II the Mad =

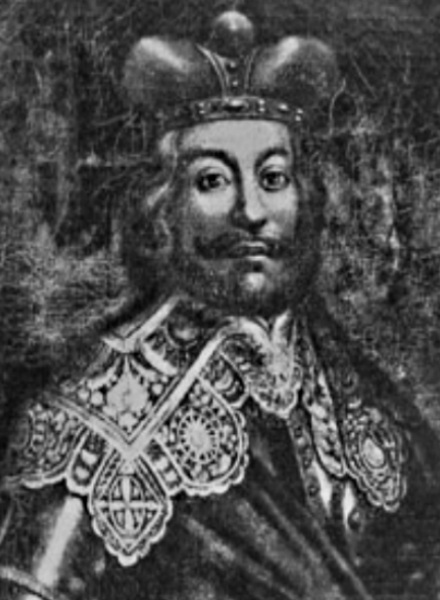
- Born: 16 April 1435
- Died: 22 September 1504 (aged 69); Wołów
- Buried: Parish church in Wołów
- Noble family: Silesian Piasts of Głogów
- Spouse: Katharina of Opava
- Father: Jan I of Żagań
- Mother: Scholastika of Saxe-Wittenberg

Jan II the Mad also known as the Bad, the Wild or the Cruel (16 April 1435 – 22 September 1504), was a Duke of Żagań-Przewóz since 1439 (with his brothers as co-rulers until 1449), from 1449 Duke of Przewóz (as co-ruler of his younger brother), during 1461–1468 and briefly in 1472 Duke of Żagań and during 1476–1488 Duke of half-Głogów (the Duchy was finally reunited in 1480).

He was the fourth and youngest son of Duke Jan I of Żagań by his wife Scholastika, daughter of Rudolf III, Duke of Saxe-Wittenberg and Elector of Saxony.

== Life ==
After his father's death in 1439, Jan II was still a minor and was placed with his brother Wenceslaus under the care of their older brothers Balthasar and Rudolf. The division of their domains was effective in 1449: Jan II and Wenceslaus received Przewóz as co-rulers. However, because at that time Wenceslaus was mentally ill, the full government of the Duchy was taken by Jan II.

The small Duchy of Przewóz did not satisfy the ambitions of Jan II, who demanded an equal division from his older brothers. The dispute ended in 1453, due to the mediation of Frederick of Saxony.

After Rudolf's death in 1454 and during the absence of Balthasar, who was in Prussia, Jan II declared himself Governor of the Duchy of Żagań. He then forced the Duchy states to pay tribute to him, an order that was eventually revoked when Balthasar return to Silesia in 1458.

The disputes erupted again in 1461, when Jan II, with the help of George of Poděbrady, King of Bohemia invaded Żagań and deposed his brother, who was forced to escape. In the same year, after the death of his mother Scholastika, he inherited her dower, the town of Nowogród Bobrzański. Seven years later, in 1468, Jan II lost Żagań, when Balthasar managed to recover the duchy, with the help of his cousin Henry XI of Głogów.

Jan II was determined to recapture Żagań, and, this time with the assistance of the Hungarian King Matthias Corvinus (who received from him 10000 florins to recruiting the needed troops who help him to win the Bohemian crown), he successfully invaded the Duchy again in 1472. Balthasar was captured and imprisoned, initially in the village of Witoszyn and later in the tower of the Przewóz castle, where, according to some sources, he was starved to death by order of Jan II (15 April 1472).

However, after only some months as a ruler of Żagań, he unexpectedly sold the Duchy (including Przewóz) to the rulers of Saxony, Ernest and Albert, for 50000 Hungarian florins (12 December 1472). The agreement, confirmed by Matthias Corvinus, also guaranteed a decent pension to Wenceslaus. Since then, the Duke was called "Jan Lackland" (Janem Bez Ziemi).

Despite the sale of his Duchy, Jan II sought to remain active in the political affairs. In 1474, at the head of troops recruited by Matthias Corvinus, he organized a successful rally at the Greater Poland, from where he brought a rich spoil. There is, of course, has very good relations with Poland.

In 1476 Henry XI of Głogów died, likely poisoned by Brandenburg agents. In his will he left his possessions to his child-widow Barbara (daughter of Albert III Achilles, Elector of Brandenburg) with reversion to her family. As the next male relative, Jan II claimed the succession of his cousin and refused to recognize the late Duke's will; also, he soon had to face the pretensions not only of Albert III Achilles but also of the King Casimir IV Jagiellon of Poland and Matthias Corvinus.

In the first phase of the war, Jan II was supported by Matthias Corvinus. His opponents sought support from Brandenburg, Bohemia and Poland. Soon was arranged the marriage between the King Władysław Jagiellon of Bohemia (Casimir IV's son) and Barbara of Brandenburg; however, this union was never consummated and under the Canon Law was invalid. Jan II used the influence of the Bohemian King in Rome and tried to force the inhabitants of Głogów to take the oath of loyalty in his favor, but they refused. The Papal legate then imposed the excommunication on Głogów, which forced them to submit to Jan II.

The Jan II's first success was on 7 December 1476, when the states of Żagań paid homage to him. One day later, on 8 December, Matthias Corvinus declared Henry XI's will null and void because the late Duke wrote them when mentally ill. By 1476–1477 the Bohemian troops gained Szprotawa and Kożuchów. In the hands of the Elector Albert III Achilles remained only Krosno Odrzańskie. In early 1477 a truce was announced between the warring parties, who lasted until April 1477. The war was resumed in spring 1477 and began years of war between the Bohemian and Hungarian troops. The disaster worsened the situation of Jan II and his Hungarian allies. However, the residents of Głogów maintain his fidelity to Jan II. The parties tried to resolve the fighting through diplomacy, but in the autumn of 1477 the truce was broken by Jan II, who invaded the Brandenburg possessions and even besieged Berlin and Frankfurt. The war continued during all 1478 with several battles. In the meanwhile, the ex-Duke of Żagań strengthened the position in Głogów. In mid-1479 a truce was concluded between the warring parties, under which the Elector Albert III Achilles gave up his claims over the Duchy of Głogów for the amount of 50,000 florins. Negotiations between Jan II and the Elector of Brandenburg lasted until September 1482. Jan II retained Głogów, but the northern part was taken by Brandenburg (around Krosno Odrzańskie, Sulechów, Świebodzin and Lubsko). According to the agreement with Matthias Corvinus, Jan II only ruled Głogów during his lifetime. After his death, the Duchy was inherited by the Hungarian King and his descendants.

In 1480 Jan II attempted to unify Głogów (the Duchy was divided in two parts, one belonged to him, and the other, which previously belonged to the Cieszyn branch, was now in power of the Bohemian Kingdom). After a siege of seven weeks, on 1 May 1480 the city was conquered and the Duchy of Głogów was finally reunited after almost 150 years of separation.

Despite all this success, Jan II's ambition became higher and therefore war erupted between him and Matthias Corvinus. The Duke of Głogów became ally of Henry I the Elder, son of George of Poděbrady and Duke of Oleśnica; as a part of the alliance, the marriage was arranged of Henry I's three sons with Jan II's three daughters. The marriage of the eldest single of Jan II's daughters, Salome, with Henry I's eldest son, Albert I was celebrated on 11 January 1487 in Głogów. One year later, on 6 January 1488, the formal betrothal was made of the other two Jan II's daughters, Hedwig and Anna, with the other two Henry I's sons, George I and Charles I. In the ceremony, Jan II declared his intentions to leave the Duchy of Głogów to his three sons-in-law after his death. That statement caused the reaction of Matthias Corvinus and the beginning of the war. Jan II wanted at all costs to force his subjects to swear fidelity to their future rulers. Unfortunately, they showed a strong resistance, even after the Duke sentenced to death seven members of the city council. In May 1488 began the siege of Głogów, culminating with the Jan II's capitulation in November of that year. The deposed Duke renounced to his claims over Głogów for 20,000 guilders.

In subsequent years, he tried unsuccessfully to find a piece of the Silesian Duchies where he could spend the rest of his turbulent life. He even put his claim over Ścinawa or his return to Głogów, but without positive results. In 1497 Henry I the Elder give him the town of Wołów as a fief during his lifetime.

Jan II died in Wołów on 22 September 1504, ending with him the male line of the Żagań-Głogów branch. He was buried in the local parish church.

A controversial figure, Jan II was praised by some historians for his ambitions and criticized by others for his fussiness and crazy ideas.

== Marriage and issue ==
By 1462 Jan II married Katharina (b. 1443 – d. 14 April 1505), daughter of Duke William I of Opava. They had five daughters:

1. Margareta (b. 1465 – d. aft. 1502), married firstly by 28 March 1484 to Miklós Bánffy de Alsólendva and secondly with Johann Hampo.
2. Salome (b. aft. 11 January 1475 – d. bef. 30 September 1514), married firstly on 11 January 1487 to Albert I of Poděbrady, Duke of Ziębice-Oleśnica (Münsterberg-Oels), and secondly in 1512 to Johann IV of Kurzbach, Baron von Trachenberg-Militsch.
3. Hedwig (b. October 1476 – d. Ziębice, 15 February 1524), married firstly on July 1489 to George I of Poděbrady, Duke of Ziębice-Oleśnica (Münsterberg-Oels), and secondly on 23 October 1503 to Sigismund, Baron of Wartenberg.
4. Anna (b. ca. 1480 – d. Zabkowice, Silesia, 28 October 1541), married on 3 March 1495 to Charles I of Poděbrady, Duke of Ziębice-Oleśnica (Münsterberg-Oels).
5. Barbara (b. ca. 1481 – d. 6 April 1539), Abbess of St. Klara in Strzelin (1495).

Jan II the Mad House of Piast Born: 16 April 1435 Died: 22 September 1504
Preceded by Jan I	Duke of Żagań; 1439–1449; With: Balthasar, Rudolf and Wenceslaus	Succeeded by Balthasar and Rudolf
Preceded by Jan I	Duke of Przewóz; 1439–1472; With: Balthasar, Rudolf (until 1449) and Wenceslaus	Annexed by the House of Wettin
Preceded by Balthasar	Duke of Żagań; 1461–1468	Succeeded by Balthasar
Preceded by Balthasar	Duke of Żagań; 1472	Annexed by the House of Wettin
Preceded by Henry XI	Duke of Lubin; 1476–1482	Succeeded by Frederick I
Preceded by Henry XI	Duke of Głogów (1/2); 1476–1480	Reunification of the Duchy
Preceded by Direct sovereignty of the Kingdom of Bohemia last holders Przemysław II (titular); Margareta (nominal)	Duke of Głogów (1/2); 1480	Reunification of the Duchy
Reunification of the Duchy	Duke of Głogów; 1480–1488	Succeeded by János Corvinus
