= Jan I of Żagań =

- Born: c. 1385
- Died: 12 April 1439; Żagań
- Noble family: Silesian Piasts of Głogów
- Spouse: Scholastika of Saxe-Wittenberg
- Issue: Anna; Hedwig; Balthasar of Żagań; Rudolf of Żagań; Margareta; Barbara; Scholastika; Agnes; Wenceslaus of Żagań; Jan II the Mad
- Father: Henry VIII the Sparrow
- Mother: Katharina of Opole

Jan I of Żagań (Polish: Jan I żagański) (c. 1385 – 12 April 1439) was a duke of Żagań-Głogów from 1397 (until 1412 with his brothers as co-rulers), from 1403 Duke of Żagań, Krosno Odrzańskie and Świebodzin (again, until 1412 with his brothers as co-rulers) and from 1412 sole ruler of Żagań and Przewóz.

He was the eldest son of Henry VIII the Sparrow, Duke of Głogów by his wife Katharina, daughter of Duke Władysław of Opole.

== Life ==
At the time of Henry VIII's death (14 March 1397) his sons were minors. Duke Rupert I of Legnica took the regency of Głogów until 1401, when Jan I formally assumed guardianship of his younger brothers Henry IX the Elder, Henry X Rumpold and Wenceslaus and began his personal rule in Szprotawa, Przemków, Sulechów, half of Głogów, and Bytom Odrzański.

In 1403 their aunt Hedwig of Legnica (Henry VI the Elder's widow) renounced her dower lands (Żagań, Krosno Odrzańskie and Świebodzin) to Jan I and his brothers, who ruled all the lands jointly. Thanks to the privilege of Elector Rudolf III of Saxony in 1408 he could maintain the unity of his duchy despite the protest of his brothers, who claimed their own districts. Ultimately, the division was made in 1412: Jan I retained Żagań, and one year later (in 1413) he also took possession over the duchy of Przewóz in the Polish-German border area (obtained as a result of his marriage with Scholastika, a daughter of Elector Rudolph III).

After the extinction of the main branch of the dukes of Legnica in 1419, Jan I played an important role at the request of many of the cities of Lower Silesia: he initiated the creation of an organization to fight the gangs of robbers who regularly attacked the roads, cities and monasteries.

Jan I performed his duties as vassal of Bohemia faithfully, and therefore in 1420 took part in the expedition of Emperor Sigismund against the Hussites; on July 28 that year he assisted in his coronation as King of Bohemia in Prague.

Three years later, John participated with his brothers in the negotiations between the emperor and Teutonic Knights in Preszburg (now Bratislava), where it was decided go to war against Poland. However, given the growing difficulties of the emperor with the Hussites and the Teutonic Knights' requests for the city of Kežmarok in exchange for his help, the meeting was unsuccessful.

Struggles with the Hussites continued in 1427 and 1428, when Jan and his brother Henryk IX Starszy supported the threatened Lusatian cities. On 1 November 1428 the brothers defeated the Hussite troops at the Battle of Kratzau.

In 1429 Jan I went with the emperor to Lutsk in the Grand Duchy of Lithuania, where he took part in the congress in which the coronation of Vytautas the Great as king was decided. At the same time, in connection with the growing power of the Hussites, the Duke of Żagań decided to pay them high contributions, which was to ensure the safety of his lands.

However, for some time, Jan I had begun to secretly promote the Hussite movement and his revolutionary ideals. On 19 April 1433, together with his brother Henryk IX Starszy and the Dukes of Oleśnica, he went to Kalisz, where he promised to the Polish king Władysław II Jogaila his participation in the proposed expedition against the Hussites of Krzyżakom (these actions may have been, however, a simple desire to safeguard his duchy against the Hussites in case of a war).

After the death of Emperor Sigismund, Jan I stood on the side of his son-in-law Albert V of Habsburg, and on 3 December 1438 he paid tribute to him in Wrocław. As a reward for his loyalty, the new king gave Jan I many benefits, including the right to mint coins in the cities of Szprotawa and Żagań.

Jan I had a radical and oppressive rule against his subjects, which led to a conflict with the Augustinian order in Żagań. At some point, he even captured and imprisoned the abbot of the monastery, for which he was excommunicated. Because of these events, in contemporary sources he was considered a cruel man and even a sadist, as was further described in the Roczniku Głogowskim: when he had sexual relations with his wife he tended to sharpen his spurs. Finally, unable to withstand her husband's brutal treatment, Scholastika attempted to escape from Żagań. However, she was captured and confined in Nowogród Bobrzański by order of her husband, without the right to return to the castle or the capital of the duchy.

Jan I died on 12 April 1439 in Żagań, was buried in ducal mausoleum of the Augustinian church in Żagań.

== Marriage and issue ==
By 1405, Jan I married Scholastika (c. 1393 – 12 May 1461), daughter of Rudolf III, Duke of Saxe-Wittenberg and Elector of Saxony. They had ten children:

1. Anna (c. 1408 – before 4 November 1437), married by 1424 to Count Albert VIII of Lindow-Ruppin.
2. Hedwig (c. 1410 – 14 May 1497, Bernburg), married on 11 March 1434 to Prince Bernhard VI of Anhalt-Bernburg.
3. Balthasar (c. 1415 – 15 July 1472, Przewóz).
4. Rudolf (c. 1418 – 18 September 1454, killed in battle in Chojnice).
5. Margareta (c. 1425 – after 9 May 1491, Salzderhelden), married firstly by 1435 to Count Volrad II of Mansfeld, secondly in 1450 to Count Henry XI of Honstein-Wittenberg and thirdly before 20 June 1457 to Duke Henry III of Brunswick-Grubenhagen.
6. Barbara (c. 1426 – by 28 July 1476).
7. Scholastika (c. 1428 – before 1489).
8. Agnes (c. 1430 – by 6 December 1473).
9. Wenceslaus (c. 1434 – 29 April 1488).
10. Jan II the Mad (16 April 1435 – 22 September 1504).

Scholastika never left Nowogród Bobrzański because the territory was granted to her in her husband's will as her dower. She ruled it until her death.

Jan I of Żagań House of Piast Born: c. 1385 Died: 12 April 1439
Preceded by Henry VIII the Sparrow	Duke of Glogów (1/2); 1397–1412; With: Henry IX, Henry X and Wenceslaus	Succeeded by Henry IX the Older; Henry X Rumpold; Wenceslaus
Preceded by Hedwig	Duke of Żagań; 1403–1439; With: Henry IX, Henry X and Wenceslaus (until 1412)	Succeeded by Balthasar; Rudolf; Wenceslaus; Jan II the Mad
Duchy granted by the House of Wettin	Duke of Przewóz; 1413–1439	Succeeded by Balthasar; Rudolf; Wenceslaus; Jan II the Mad
