= Henry XI of Głogów =

15th-century Polish nobleman

- Duke of Głogów
- Born: c. 1435
- Died: 22 February 1476
- Noble family: Silesian Piasts of Głogów
- Father: Henryk IX Starszy
- Mother: Hedwig of Oleśnica

Henry XI of Głogów (Polish: Henryk; ca. 1435 – 22 February 1476) was a Duke of Głogów (including half of Głogów, Szprotawa, Krosno Odrzańskie, Świebodzin, Kożuchów and Zielona Góra) and Lubin since 1467.

He was the second son of Henryk IX Starszy, Duke of Głogów by his wife Hedwig, daughter of Duke Konrad III the Old duke of Oleśnica.

== Life ==
The death of his older brother Sigismund on 24 December 1458 made him the sole heir of his father (another brother, whose name is unknown, died young). In 1462, Henry XI participated in the meeting between King Casimir IV of Poland and King George of Bohemia. With his father, he was excommunicated by the Pope Pius II for not to support the eventual inheritance of Casimir IV's son over the Bohemia throne. After Henry IX's death in 1467, his son assumed the government over Głogów.

Henry XI was very indolent and sickly person since his childhood. He settled his main residence in Kożuchów, which was the capital of his Duchy. After assumed the government, he didn't show greater political ambitions, because he lived all his adult life under the shadow of his father. Following the advice of the City Council of Wrocław he sent a message to Kraków, where he encouraged King Casimir IV or one of his sons to take the throne of Bohemia.

In 1468, Henry XI decided to support King Matthias Corvinus of Hungary and participated in his unsuccessful trip to Silesia and Lusatia against King George of Bohemia.

Since the beginning of his reign, Henry XI continued his father's politics, for example, when he successfully supported his cousin Balthasar in his attempt to recover the Duchy of Żagań after being deposed by his brother Jan II the Mad in 1468. One year later, during King Matthias's coronation as King of Bohemia at Olomouc, he received the formal restoration of the lands belonged to the Duchy of Głogów who were annexed by the Kingdom of Bohemia since 1360 (including the other half of Głogów), but he only could take formal possession after the death of Margareta of Celje (widow of Duke Władysław, from the Cieszyn branch), who held the cities as her dower.

Henryk XI remained unmarried for a long time. At the end of his life, and under the pressures of his advisers, who acting on behalf of the Elector Albert III Achilles of Brandenburg, was arranged his marriage with one of the Elector's daughter, the twelve-years-old Barbara. In the marriage contract was stipulated that, in case of the Duke's death without issue, all his lands were passed to his wife, with reversion to her family. The wedding took place in Berlin on 11 October 1472.

Henry XI died suddenly on 22 February 1476, probably poisoned by Brandenburg agents. He was buried in the Church of the Mother's Day in Kożuchów.

After his death, broke a long succession war for the Duchy of Głogów. The next legitimate male heir of Henry XI was his cousin Jan II the Mad, former Duke of Żagań, who had to face the pretensions of the Elector of Brandenburg, Matthias Corvinus and the King of Poland. Only in 1482 was finally made an arrangement in Kamieniec Ząbkowicki, under which the towns of Krosno Odrzańskie, Sulechów, Lubsko, Bobrowice passed to Brandenburg.

Henryk XI is negatively evaluated by both Polish and German historians. They accuse him of incompetence and weakness. Nevertheless, he was a true prince of his time: he much enjoyed eating, drinking and sleeping.

Preceded by Henry IX the Older	Duke of Glogów (1/2); 1467–1476	Succeeded by Jan II the Mad
Preceded by Henry IX the Older	Duke of Lubin; 1467–1476	Succeeded by Jan II the Mad
