= Przewóz, Żary County =

Przewóz
- Village
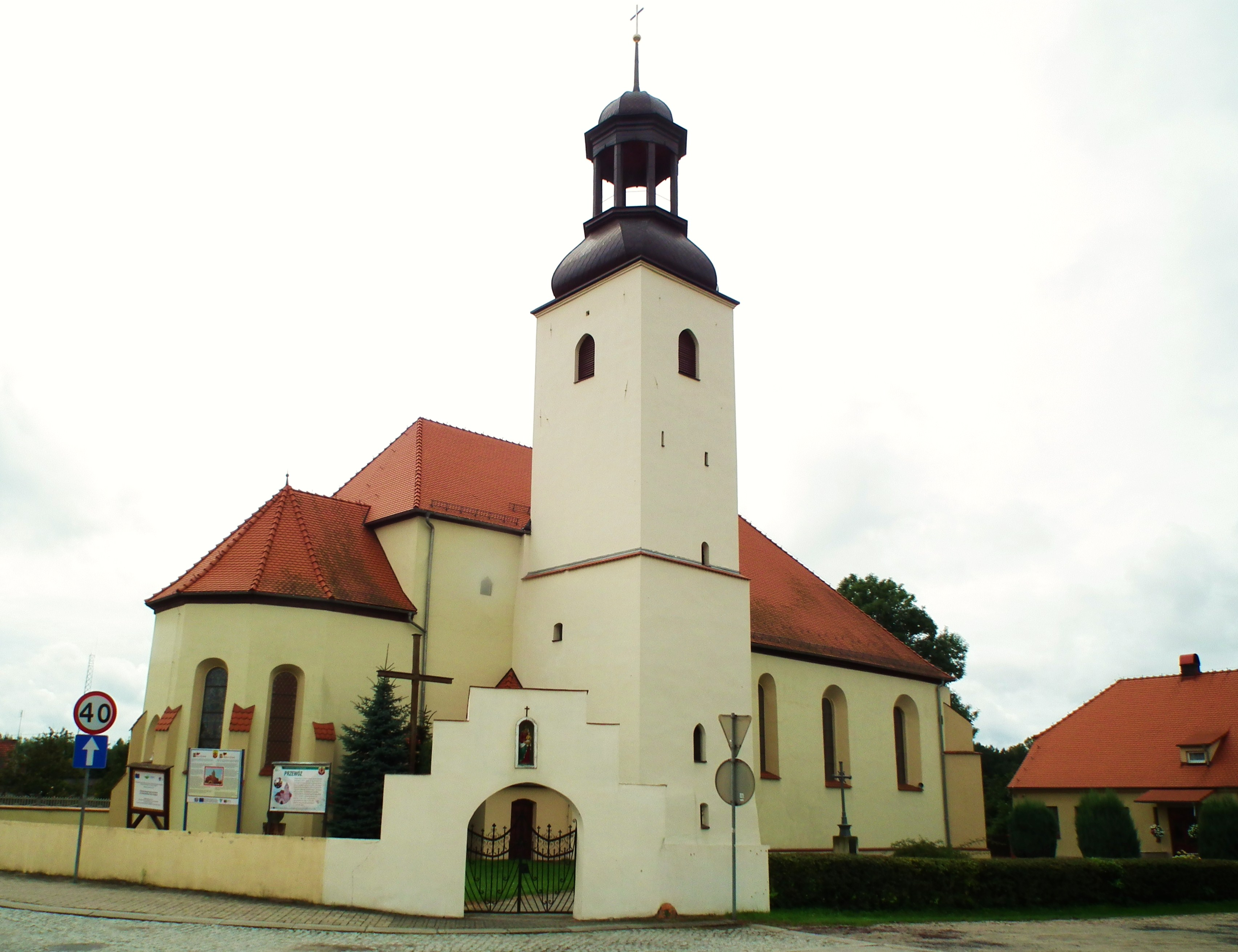
- Medieval Immaculate Conception church

- Location within Poland
- Coordinates: 51°28′40″N 14°57′0″E
- Country: Poland
- Voivodeship: Lubusz
- County: Żary
- Gmina: Przewóz

Population
  - Total: 850
- Time zone: UTC+1 (CET)
  - Summer (DST): UTC+2 (CEST)
- Vehicle registration: FZA

Przewóz ([ˈpʂɛvus], German: Priebus) is a village in Żary County, Lubusz Voivodeship, in western Poland. It is located in the historic Lower Silesia region on the eastern shore of the Lusatian Neisse river, on the border with Germany. Przewóz is the seat of the gmina (administrative district) called Gmina Przewóz. It is the site of a border crossing on the road between Żary and the German town of Görlitz.

== History ==
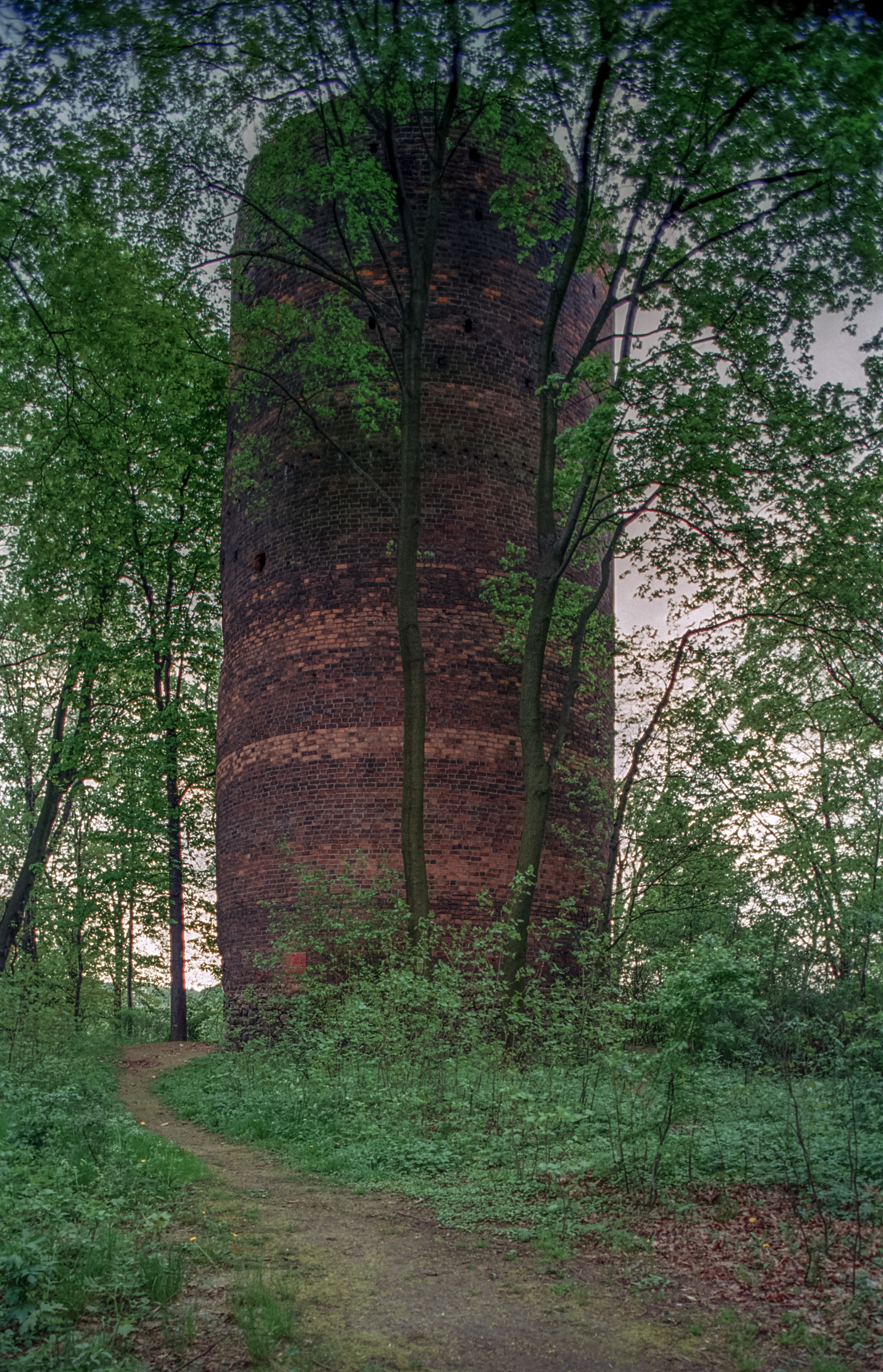
Hunger Tower

The settlement was included in the early Polish state by Bolesław I the Brave. Following the fragmentation of Poland into smaller provincial duchies, it initially formed part of the Duchy of Silesia, and later also the duchies of Jawor, Świdnica and Żagań. Przewóz served as a fortress defending Poland's western border. The first church was allegedly founded in 1012, and was renewed by Duke Przemko of Ścinawa of the Piast dynasty in 1290. A brick castle, whose tower, called the Hunger Tower or Balthasar Tower, was preserved to this day, was founded during the rule of either Konrad I or Henry III. The oldest known mention of the town comes from 1311. Przewóz was fortified by a defensive wall and moat with two main gates. It was located at the intersection of important east-west and north-south trade routes, which connected Leipzig with Poland, and Bohemia proper with Bohemian-ruled Brandenburg.

In 1449, it became the capital of a small eponymous duchy under Jan II the Mad. Jan II the Mad had his older brother Balthasar imprisoned and starved to death at the castle's tower in 1472, shortly before he sold his duchy to Duke Albert III of Saxony. With Żagań, Przewóz fell to the Kingdom of Bohemia in 1549. The town was hit by an epidemic in 1586 and also suffered during the Thirty Years' War in 1631. In 1742 it was conquered and annexed by Prussia upon the First Silesian War. From 1871 on it was part of the German Reich. In 1872, it had a population of 1,235. In 1895 a rail connection with Jankowa Żagańska was opened. After Germany's defeat in World War II, in 1945, it became again part of Poland (see Territorial changes of Poland after World War II), although with a Soviet-installed communist regime, which stayed in power until the 1980s.
