= Troja =

Troja may refer to:

== Places ==
- Troy, in Asia Minor
- Troja (Epirus), a town in ancient Epirus
- Troja, ancient name of Cestria (Epirus), a town of ancient Epirus
- Troja, Kosovo, a hamlet in Kosovo near Gjakova
- Troja/Ljungby, an ice hockey club in Ljungby, Sweden
- Troja Palace, a palace/château in Prague, Czech Republic
- Troja (Prague), a cadastral area of Prague, Czech Republic
- Troja, an ancient name of Xypete, a deme in ancient Attica
- Troia, Apulia, formerly known as Troja
- Troja railway station, Jamaica

== People ==
- Troja (surname), a surname
- Troja (singer), American musical theater performer

== Other ==
- Troja (band), a heavy metal band from Kosovo

== See also ==
- Troia (disambiguation)
- Troya (disambiguation)
- Troy (disambiguation)
