= Dark of the Sun =

1968 British war film by Jack Cardiff

- Original film poster by Frank McCarthy
- Directed by: Jack Cardiff
- Screenplay by: Ranald MacDougall (as Quentin Werty); Adrien Spies
- Based on: The Dark of the Sun; 1965 novel by Wilbur Smith
- Produced by: George Englund
- Starring: Rod Taylor; Yvette Mimieux; Jim Brown; Peter Carsten
- Cinematography: Edward Scaife
- Edited by: Ernest Walter
- Music by: Jacques Loussier
- Production company: MGM-British Studios
- Distributed by: Metro-Goldwyn-Mayer
- Release dates: 8 February 1968 (UK); 3 July 1968 (USA)
- Running time: 101 minutes
- Country: United Kingdom
- Language: English
- Box office: $2 million (US/ Canada rentals)

Dark of the Sun (also known as The Mercenaries in the UK) is a 1968 British adventure war film starring Rod Taylor, Yvette Mimieux, Jim Brown, and Peter Carsten. The film, which was directed by Jack Cardiff, is based on Wilbur Smith's 1965 novel, The Dark of the Sun. The story about a band of mercenaries sent on a dangerous mission during the Congo Crisis was adapted into a screenplay by Ranald MacDougall. Critics condemned the film on its original release for its graphic scenes of violence and torture.

== Plot ==
In 1964, mercenary Bruce Curry is publicly hired by Congolese President Ubi to rescue European residents from an isolated mining town about to be attacked by rebel Simbas. However, his real mission is to retrieve $50 million of diamonds from a mine company's vault. Curry's group includes his black friend Ruffo and alcoholic Doctor Wreid. He also reluctantly recruits ex-Nazi Henlein because he needs his military expertise and leadership skills.

Ubi gives Curry a steam train and Congolese government soldiers. However, as the mission is in violation of UN accords, the train is attacked and damaged by a United Nations peacekeeping plane. At a burned-out farmhouse, they pick up a traumatised woman named Claire, who watched her husband being hacked to death by Simbas. Meanwhile, Henlein begins to cause trouble because he knows about the diamonds and resents Curry's leadership. He casually kills two children for being possible Simba spies and starts making advances towards Claire. When interrupted by Curry, the German attacks Curry with a swagger stick and a chainsaw. Only Ruffo is able to stop Curry from killing Henlein.

Further complications arise when the mercenaries reach the mining town. First, the diamonds are in a time-locked vault delaying the train's departure. Second, Dr Wreid insists he cannot abandon a pregnant woman at a nearby mission hospital. Reluctantly, Curry agrees to let the doctor stay behind.

As Curry waits anxiously for the vault to open, the Simbas attack the town and the station. The train, loaded with the diamonds and residents, slowly departs under small arms fire. However, a mortar round destroys the coupling between the last two carriages. The last coach - carrying the diamonds and most of the Europeans - rolls back into the Simba-held town as the rest of the train steams away.

Curry and Ruffo set out to retrieve the diamonds during the night. Using a Simba disguise, Ruffo carries Curry's seemingly lifeless body into the town's hotel, where harrowing scenes depict murder, torture and male rape. A diversionary attack by surviving Congolese soldiers enables them to get the diamonds and escape in vehicles. When they run low on fuel, Curry leaves to find more. Henlein takes advantage of his absence to kill Ruffo in the mistaken belief that he has the diamonds. When Curry returns to find his friend dead, he pursues Henlein and kills him after a vicious fight. Back at the convoy, with his job done, Curry reflects on the type of man he is before turning himself in for a court-martial to answer for his actions.

== Cast ==
- Rod Taylor as Capt. Bruce Curry †
- Yvette Mimieux as Claire
- Peter Carsten as Capt. Henlein ‡
- Jim Brown as Sgt Ruffo
- Kenneth More as Dr. Wreid
- André Morell as Bussier
- Olivier Despax as Lt. Surrier
- Guy Deghy as Delage
- Bloke Modisane as Kataki
- Calvin Lockhart as President Mwamini Ubi
- Alan Gifford as Jansen
- David Bauer as Adams
- Murray Kash as Cochrane
- John Serret as Father Dominic
- Danny Daniels as General Moses

† Taylor's fictional character is a light homage to Congo mercenary leader "Mad" Mike Hoare, who led the Congolese 5 Commando during the actual Simba rebellion and was a technical consultant on the film.
‡ A real German mercenary named Siegfried Müller fought in the Congo during the 1960s wearing an Iron Cross. In 1966, he was featured in the East German documentary entitled Der lachende Mann (English: The Laughing Man). In the English language version, Peter Carsten's voice was dubbed by Paul Frees.

== Novel ==
The Dark of the Sun
- Paperback edition
- Author: Wilbur Smith
- Language: English
- Genre: Thriller
- Publisher: Heinemann
- Publication date: 1 March 1965
- Publication place: South Africa
- Media type: Print, e-book
- ISBN: 978-0434714001

The script is based on the second published novel by Wilbur Smith. Both the book and the film are a fictional account of the Congo Crisis (1960–1966), when Joseph Mobutu seized power during the First Republic of the Congo after national independence from Belgium.

The conflict in Dark of the Sun juxtaposes the anti-colonial struggle in the province of Katanga within the context of the Cold War. A UN-peacekeeping operation was employed to protect civilians during this brutal secessionist war. Actual violence in the Congo resulted in the deaths of up to 100,000 people.

However while the film focuses on the Simba revolt, the novel concerns the earlier Baluba Rebellion.

Smith had just written his first published novel, When the Lion Feeds. He decided to quit his job in the South African taxation office, calculating he had enough money in sales and unclaimed leave to not have to work for two years. "I hired a caravan, parked it in the mountains, and wrote the second book", he said. "I knew it was sort of a watershed. I was 30 years of age, single again, and I could take the chance."

The book was written in the Vumba Mountains. Smith put in many feelings about the ending of his first marriage into the character of Bruce Curry. Like Smith's first published novel Dark of the Sun was banned in South Africa.

The Guardian called it "unpleasant, gritty."

== Production ==
=== Screenplay ===
Although the novel is set against the Baluba rebellion in 1960, the film's screenplay is set during the Simba Rebellion of 1964–65, when mercenaries were recruited by the Congolese government to fight a leftist insurgency.

In December 1964 Ranald MacDougall was working in the script.

Rod Taylor claimed he rewrote a fair amount of the script himself, including helping devise a new ending.

=== Casting ===
Rod Taylor signed on to make the film in September 1966 by which time the script had been rewritten by Adrian Spies. In October, Jim Brown, who had just made The Dirty Dozen for MGM, signed to costar. Kenneth More, who only a few years earlier had been the biggest star in Britain, played a support role.

=== Filming ===
Filming started 16 January 1967. Most of the film was shot on location in Jamaica using the country's railway system; this took advantage of a working steam train as well as safety and cost-effectiveness. The railway scenes were shot on the line between Frankfield and Albany railway station (where Henlein kills the two children). The arrival scenes were filmed at Palisadoes Airport (now Norman Manley International) while a private residence within the Blue Mountain range was dressed to look like an African mission station.

Interiors were completed at MGM British Studios, Borehamwood near London. At the same time, MGM was filming Graham Greene's The Comedians (1967) in Africa, though the original took place in the Caribbean.

=== International versions ===
In the German version, Curry was renamed Willy Krüger and was portrayed as a former Wehrmacht officer who had already clashed with Henlein during World War II because of the latter's fanatical Nazism. The German version is misleadingly entitled Katanga, implying the film takes place during the first Congo emergency in 1961–64, when mercenaries like Müller and 'Mad' Mike Hoare were involved.

The movie was released in France as Last Train from Katanga (French: Le dernier train du Katanga).

=== Soundtrack ===
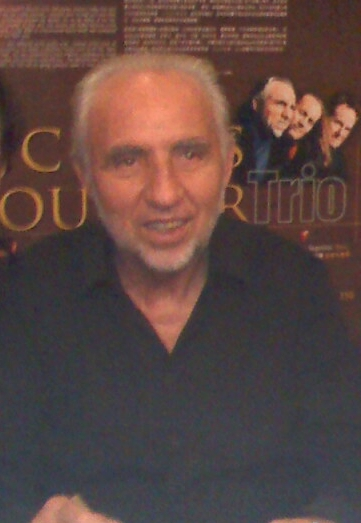
Jacques Loussier, a French jazz pianist wrote the film's memorable progressive score. It was initially released by MGM Records in 1968; a re-release with bonus tracks was made available in 2008.

All music is composed by Jacques Loussier.

| No. | Title | Length |
|---|---|---|
| 1. | "Main Theme From Dark of the Sun" | 3:10 |
| 2. | "Drive to Ubi" | 3:39 |
| 3. | "Dr. Wreid" | 1:01 |
| 4. | "The Mercenaries" | 2:36 |
| 5. | "Claire's First Appearance" | 3:44 |
| 6. | "Friendly Natives Having Fun Pt. 2" | 2:19 |
| 7. | "The Fight/Port Reprieve" | 3:39 |
| 8. | "Curry and the Diamonds Pt. 1" | 2:38 |
| 9. | "Claire and Curry" | 3:46 |
| 10. | "The Mission" | 1:37 |
| 11. | "The Simbas Attack/The Coach Rolls Back" | 4:51 |
| 12. | "Tracks Blown/Stakeout/Diamond" | 1:13 |
| 13. | "Infiltration" | 1:22 |
| 14. | "Curry and the Diamonds Pt. 2" | 0:44 |
| 15. | "The Doctor Is Found" | 3:45 |
| 16. | "Curry's Plan/Ruffo's Death" | 2:38 |
| 17. | "Curry's Drive With Claire" | 1:57 |
| 18. | "The Chase" | 1:17 |
| 19. | "Revenge" | 3:30 |
| 20. | "Curry Kills Henlein" | 2:10 |
| 21. | "Curry's Decision/End Title" | 3:23 |
| 22. | "Clare and Curry Alternate" | 3:50 |
| 23. | "Main Theme From Dark of the Sun" | 1:20 |
| 24. | "End Title Alternate" | 0:42 |
| 25. | "Natives Source" | 1:02 |
| 26. | "Friendly Natives Having Fun Pt. 1" | 2:13 |
| 27. | "Natives Source" | 1:50 |
| Total length: | | 67:03 |

== Reception ==
It was the 49th most popular movie of the year in France.

The film was considered extremely violent for its time showing scenes of civilians being raped and tortured by Simbas. One contemporary reviewer was moved to comment that the director's main objective appeared to be to pack as much sadistic violence into the film's two hours as he could. On the subject of violence director Jack Cardiff commented: "Although it was a very violent story, the actual violence happening in the Congo at that time was much more than I could show in my film; in my research I encountered evidence so revolting I was nauseated. The critics complained of the violent content, but today it would hardly raise an eyebrow."

=== Cult ===
Martin Scorsese and Quentin Tarantino are two of the film's fans. Scorsese calls the film one of his "guilty pleasures". He elaborated:

This movie—Rod Taylor vs. the Simbas—was the most violent I'd seen up to that time. There's a scene where Taylor fights an ex-Nazi with chain saws. In another scene, a train full of refugees has finally escaped the Simba in the valley below—and just as it's about to reach the top of a hill, the power fails, the train goes all the way back down, and the refugees are slaughtered. It's a truly sadistic movie, but it should be seen. I'd guess that because of its utter racism, a lot of people would have found it embarrassing, so they just ignored it. The sense of the film is overwhelmingly violent; there's no consideration for anything else. The answer to everything is "kill".

The film was a particular influence on Tarantino, who used several tracks from the score for his movie Inglourious Basterds, which also features other references such as Rod Taylor in a guest role as Winston Churchill and Mélanie Laurent's character Shoshonna Dreyfus (who is Jewish) uses the alias Emmanuelle Mimieux; referring to Yvette Mimieux, to keep herself hidden from the Third Reich.

Filmink argued "it's easily one of the best films for Taylor, Brown, Mimieux and director Jack Cardiff."

== See also ==
- List of British films of 1968
