= Hope Bay =

Hope Bay may refer to:

- Hope Bay, Antarctica
- Hope Bay, Jamaica
- Hope Bay Mine in Nunavut
- Hope Bay, Ontario
