= Horace Goldin =

Russian-born American stage magician (1873–1939)

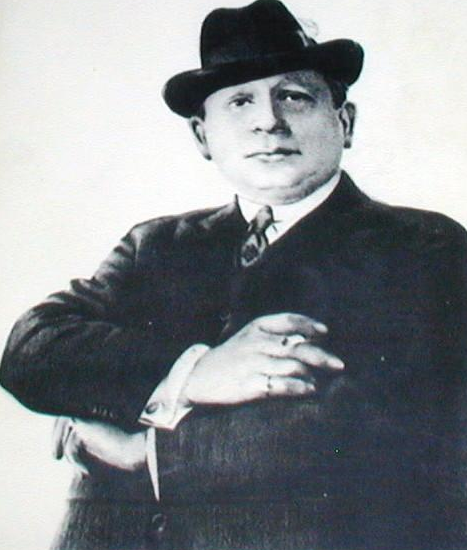
- Goldin in 1937
- Born: Hyman Elias Goldstein; 17 December 1873; Vilnius, Lithuania
- Died: 21 August 1939 (aged 65); London, England
- Resting place: Willesden Jewish Cemetery
- Occupation: Magician

Horace Goldin (17 December 1873 – 21 August 1939) was a stage magician who was noted for his rapid presentation style and who achieved international fame with his versions of the sawing a woman in half illusion.

== Early life ==
Goldin was of Polish Jewish descent and was born Hyman Elias Goldstein in Vilnius, which was then part of Russia but is now the capital of Lithuania. Sources differ as to his date of birth, some give it as 17 December 1873 and some as an unspecified date in 1874. An accident when he was young left him with a speech impediment. It has been said he showed a talent for magic tricks when he was young after he began learning from a gypsy performer. When he was 16 his family emigrated to the United States and settled in Nashville, Tennessee, where they ran a store. Despite the combination of a strong accent and a speech impediment, young Goldstein managed to make a living as a salesman.

His introduction to a performing career came when he was apprenticed to touring showman Adolph Veidt, who influenced him to take the stage name Horace Goldin. Goldin began performing magic on a part-time basis around 1894, combining tricks and jokes and billing himself as "The Humorous Conjurer". After he received poor reviews from newspapers he tried again with a new act, for which he hired assistants and adopted a rapid presentation style said to have been inspired by seeing German-born magician Imro Fox (1862–1910). Goldin did tricks quickly one after another without speaking and became known as "The Whirlwind Illusionist". With this act he found success in vaudeville and began touring the United States. In 1901 he went to London to perform at the Palace Theatre. His British shows made sufficient impact for him to be invited to do a private show for King Edward VII and royal guests at Sandringham in November 1902. In 1905 he appeared in a short comedy film made in the UK and titled Comic Conjuring. In 1915 he set out on a long tour of the Far East but this ended in disaster in 1918 when a boat carrying his equipment sank at Lahaina, Hawaii. Worse still, Goldin distrusted banks and carried his money with him (reputedly in gold) and that went to the bottom along with his props. He was forced into bankruptcy on returning home. However he was about to enter the most successful phase of his career with his development of the illusion sawing a woman in half.

== The sawing illusion ==
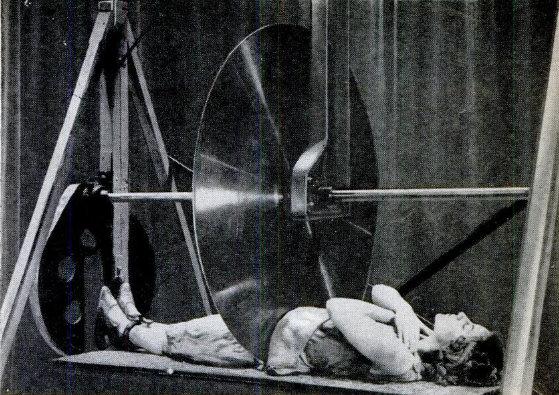
Goldin's sawing a woman in half illusion

Goldin is often credited with inventing the sawing a woman in half illusion, however it was first popularised by British magician P. T. Selbit in 1921. Goldin presented his own version of the trick a matter of months later. There remains a debate about the origin of the idea, with some sources saying a magician named Torrini may have performed the first version in front of Pope Pius VII in 1809. It has also been suggested that the trick can be traced back to ancient Egypt. However, there is a lack of solid and available evidence for these claims. There seems to be broad agreement that Selbit was the first to present the illusion on stage and that Goldin achieved a place in history through subsequent technical development and promotion. Goldin's initial version was claimed as an improvement over Selbit's because the assistant's head, hands and feet remained visible during the sawing whereas Selbit's assistant was totally obscured from view inside a box. Goldin later devised a version that dispensed with a box entirely and used a large buzzsaw.

Goldin's success owed a great deal to presentation and promotion skills and a certain amount to his persistence in suing other magicians. The Keith theatre firm hired Goldin and took on six additional sets of performers to take versions of his show on tour around the United States. Among those performers was Servais Le Roy, a Belgian who was previously one of Goldin's rivals. Promotional stunts employed for the shows included ambulances outside the theatres and performers dressed as medics to give the impression there was a real risk of serious injury. Goldin was involved in many lawsuits during this phase of his career. There are suggestions that many of these cases were motivated by publicity as well as any genuine grounds for action. However he successfully used the courts to prevent competition from other magicians. In one case he managed to obtain an injunction against Selbit over the sawing illusion despite the fact that each man had a fundamentally different version of the trick and Selbit performed his first. In other cases Goldin took on the makers of films that exposed methods behind illusions. In Goldin v. Clarion Photoplays in New York in 1922 he initially lost because the judge said he had not proved he was the original inventor of the sawing illusion and the trick possibly dated back to ancient Egypt. However Goldin appealed and won with a ruling that stated he had "satisfactorily established that he is the originator of the illusion in question, which has achieved a great success under the title devised by him of Sawing a Woman in Half...and that his creation of the illusion has been so universally recognized that the title thereof is in the public mind associated with his own name"

Some of Goldin's legal tactics resulted in problems even though they were technically successful. One such was his patenting of Sawing a woman in half. He applied for a patent in September 1921 and was awarded U.S. patent number 1,458,575 on 12 June 1923. This gave him legal right to an exclusive monopoly on his invention for 17 years and thus made it easier for him to prevent other magicians from using his methods. However patents require inventors to reveal the workings of their inventions, which meant Goldin could no longer keep his methods completely secret. In the 1930s this brought Goldin into confrontation with the R.J. Reynolds Tobacco Company, the maker of Camel cigarettes, which was running an advertising campaign aimed at debunking the publicity for a competing brand. Reynolds used the slogan "It's fun to be fooled...It's more fun to know" and ran adverts showing the secrets behind famous mysteries. In 1933 they produced one with a picture showing the workings of a version of sawing a woman in half. Goldin sued but the case was eventually dismissed by a federal court in 1938. After that Goldin gave up on litigation over the sawing illusion and focused instead on secrecy. For example, he never patented his later sawing illusion in which a giant buzzsaw blade appears to cut through an assistant.

== Success and end of his career ==
Goldin claimed the cost of his lawsuits ate up any proceeds he made from his inventions in spite of seeming financially successful. It was said he made a million dollars for the Keith theatre group and that he sometimes earned as much as US$2,000 a week. He toured internationally with his sawing illusions. He performed for King Edward VII of Britain on four occasions, earning the billing "Royal Illusionist", and also appeared before American presidents Harding and Wilson. In 1936 he appeared in a movie revue made in the UK titled Stars on Parade.

== Death ==
In his later years, Goldin became a British citizen. He died on 21 August 1939 following a show at the Wood Green Empire Theatre in London. Twenty-one years earlier at that venue, a magician named Chung Ling Soo had been killed while performing the bullet catch illusion. Goldin performed the same trick successfully but died in his sleep later.

== Publications ==
- Mysterious Tricks (1930)
- It's Fun To Be Fooled (1937)

== Selected filmography ==
- Stars on Parade (1936)
