= Troia =

Troia may refer to:

- Troia (surname), a surname
- Troia, an Italian profanity

== Places and jurisdictions ==
=== Europe ===
- Troia, Apulia, a comune in the Province of Foggia, southern Italy
  - the former Roman Catholic Diocese of Troia, since 1986 included in the Roman Catholic Diocese of Lucera–Troia, with see in the above town
  - Troia Cathedral
  - Uva di Troia, a grape variety
- Tróia Peninsula, a peninsula in Setúbal District, Alentejo, Portugal

=== Near East ===
- Troy (Ilion, Illium), an archaeological site in Çanakkale Province, Marmara, Asian Turkey
- Tura, Egypt, a town in Cairo Governorate, Egypt

== Fiction and entertainment ==
- Troia (board game), a German board game
- Troia, a town in the video game Final Fantasy IV
- Troia Base, a level in the video game Mega Man X8
- Donna Troy, a character from the American comic company DC Comics who was formerly Wonder Girl

== See also ==
- Troja (disambiguation)
- Troy (disambiguation)
- Troya (disambiguation)
