= Guscott =

Guscott is a surname. Notable people with the surname include:

- Jeremy Guscott (born 1965), English rugby union player
- Lindon Guscott (born 1972), English footballer
- Rubina Ann Guscott (1900–2002), Jamaican-American community leader

== See also ==
- Layla Guscoth (born 1992), English netballer
