= Albany station =

Albany station may refer to:

== Transportation ==
- Albany busway station, a bus rapid transit station in Auckland, New Zealand
- Albany railway station, Jamaica, a former station
- Albany railway station, Western Australia, a former station
- Albany station (Oregon), a passenger station in the United States
- Albany Park railway station, a suburban station in London, England
- Albany–Rensselaer station, a passenger station in Albany, New York, United States
- Union Station (Albany, New York), a former station in the United States

== Other ==
- Albany Pump Station, a former pumphouse in Albany, New York, United States

== See also ==
- Albany (disambiguation)
