= St. Margaret's Bay, Jamaica =

Town in Portland Parish, Jamaica

Coordinates: 18°11′41″N 76°31′18″W

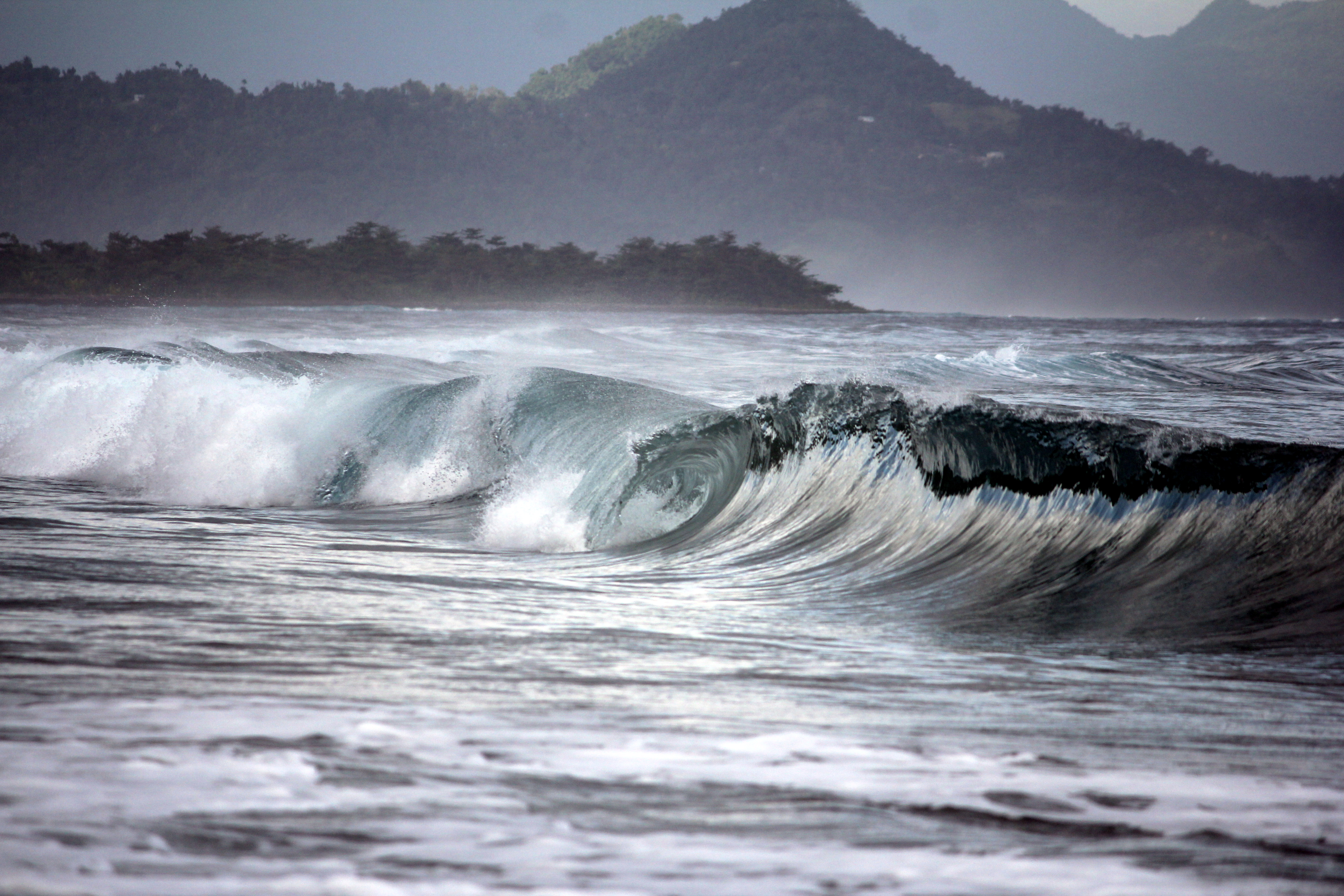
Waves at St. Margaret's Bay in 2013

St. Margaret's Bay is a town in Portland Parish, Jamaica. It is located on the Northern Coastal Highway to the west of Port Antonio.

== History ==
The beach at St. Margaret’s Bay was historically used in the shipment of banana. The mouth of the Rio Grande River is located to the east of the beach.

== Buildings and structures ==
- Ken Jones Aerodrome

== Politics ==
St. Margaret's Bay is part of the Portland Western parliamentary constituency for elections to the Jamaican Parliament.
