= Boston Beach =

- Beach
- Location within Jamaica
- Coordinates: 18.1584221°N 76.3550127°W
- Country: Jamaica
- Parish: Portland
- Time zone: UTC-5 (EST)

Boston Beach is a coastal community on the north coast of the island of Jamaica, with a public beach which is one of the few beaches in Jamaica attracting surfers. It is located nine miles east of the town of Port Antonio.

== History ==
Around 1870 traders from Boston, Massachusetts began transporting bananas from Portland Parish, Jamaica to Boston for sale. The Boston Fruit Company was established and the area experienced an economic boom. Eventually the company would merge with others and become the United Fruit Company which would go on to dominate the banana trade in the Caribbean and Latin America. The United Fruit Company would eventually become United Brands in the 1970s and eventually be bought by Del Monte Corporations.

The western side of the beach itself was donated to the Jamaican Government by the author Robin Moore.

== Cuisine ==
Boston Beach is known for its "jerk" pork and chicken stands and could be considered the birthplace of the spicy jerk seasoning for which Jamaica is known. In Kingston, the capital of Jamaica, there is a popular local take out restaurant known as "Boston Jerk."

== See also ==
- List of beaches in Jamaica
