= Siegfried Müller =

Siegfried Müller may refer to:

- Siegfried Müller (SS officer) (1914–1974), SS officer
- Siegfried Müller (mercenary) (1920–1983), mercenary, Wehrmacht officer-candidate
- Siegfried Müller (sidecarcrosser), German sidecarcross racer
