= Ken Jones Aerodrome =

- IATA: POT; ICAO: MKKJ

Summary
- Airport type: Public
- Operator: Airports Authority of Jamaica
- Serves: Port Antonio, Jamaica
- Location: St. Margaret's Bay, Jamaica
- Elevation AMSL: 20 ft (6.1 m)
- Coordinates: 18°11′56″N 076°32′04″W

Map
- Location in Jamaica

Runways
Direction	Length		Surface
Direction	ft	m	Surface
09/27	3,425	1,044	Asphalt
- Sources: AAJ, DAFIF

Ken Jones Aerodrome (IATA: POT, ICAO: MKKJ) is an airport located 10 km (6.2 mi) west of Port Antonio, in northeastern Jamaica. The facility is named after Jamaican civil servant and politician Ken Jones (1924–1964). It serves tourist resorts in the area and local travel. Ken Jones Aerodrome handled approximately 8,546 passengers in 2001.

== Facilities ==
The airport resides at an elevation of 20 ft (6 m) above mean sea level. It has one runway designated 09/27 with an asphalt surface measuring 3,425 ft × 90 ft (1,044 m × 27 m). There are no fueling facilities and the airport has no night flight operations.

== History ==
During the middle 1960s, the airport received domestic commercial air service on Air Jamaica from Kingston and Ocho Rios,on De Havilland Heron four engines, 15 passengers aircraft.

== Airlines and destinations ==
There are no scheduled services to the aerodrome.

== Statistics ==
The following table shows the number of passengers using the airport annually from 1997 through 2001.

	1997	1998	1999	2000	2001
Passengers	12,251	11,493	12,400	9,836	8,546
