= Krosno Odrzańskie =

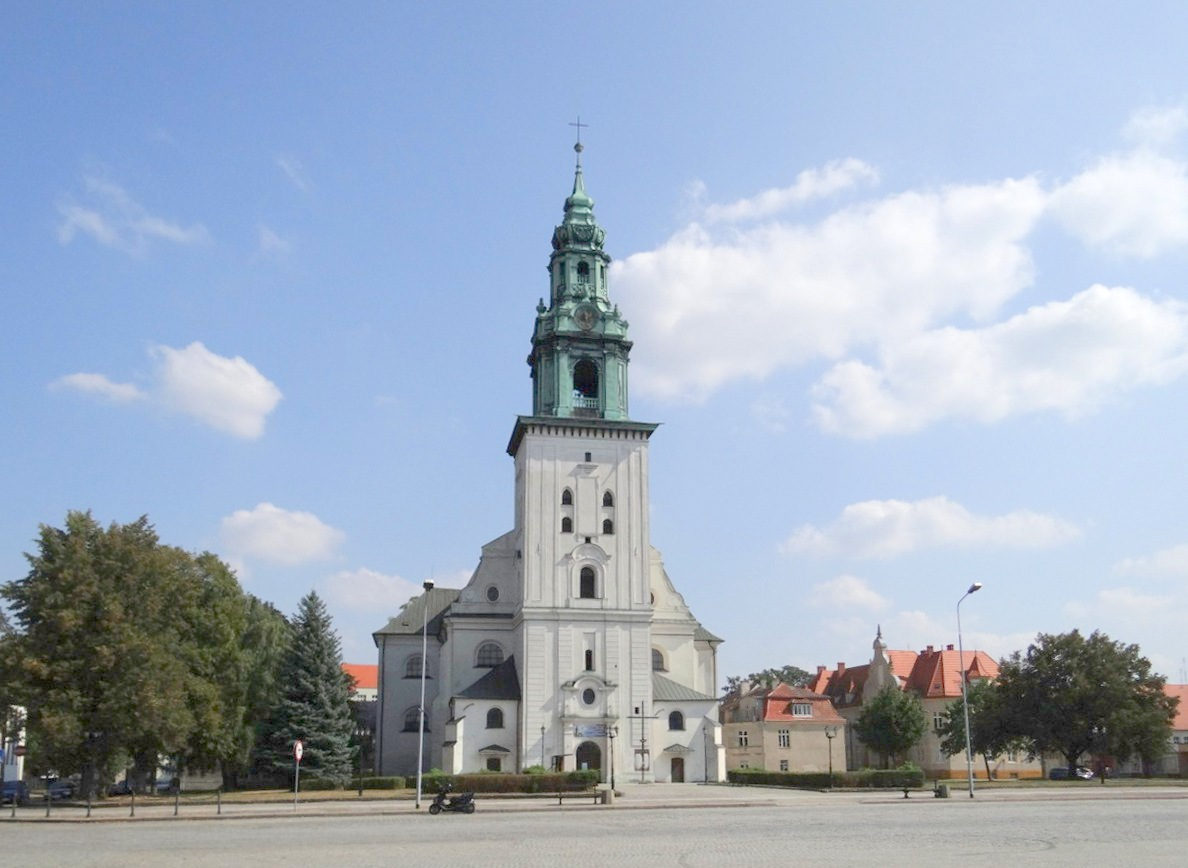
- Parish church

- Flag Coat of arms

- Location within Poland
- Coordinates: 52°2′N 15°6′E
- Country: Poland
- Voivodeship: Lubusz
- County: Krosno
- Gmina: Krosno Odrzańskie
- Town rights: before 1238

Government
  - Mayor: Grzegorz Garczyński

Area
  - Total: 8.11 km^{2} (3.13 sq mi)
- Highest elevation: 85 m (279 ft)
- Lowest elevation: 38 m (125 ft)

Population (2019-06-30)
  - Total: 11,319
  - Density: 1,400/km^{2} (3,610/sq mi)
- Time zone: UTC+1 (CET)
  - Summer (DST): UTC+2 (CEST)
- Postal code: 66-600 to 66-603
- Area code: +48 68
- Car plates: FKR
- Website: www.krosnoodrzanskie.pl

Krosno Odrzańskie [ˈkrɔsnɔ ɔˈdʐaɲskʲɛ] (German: Crossen an der Oder) is a town in Lubusz Voivodeship in western Poland, on the east bank of Oder River, at the confluence with the Bóbr. With 11,319 inhabitants (2019) it is the capital of Krosno County.

== History ==
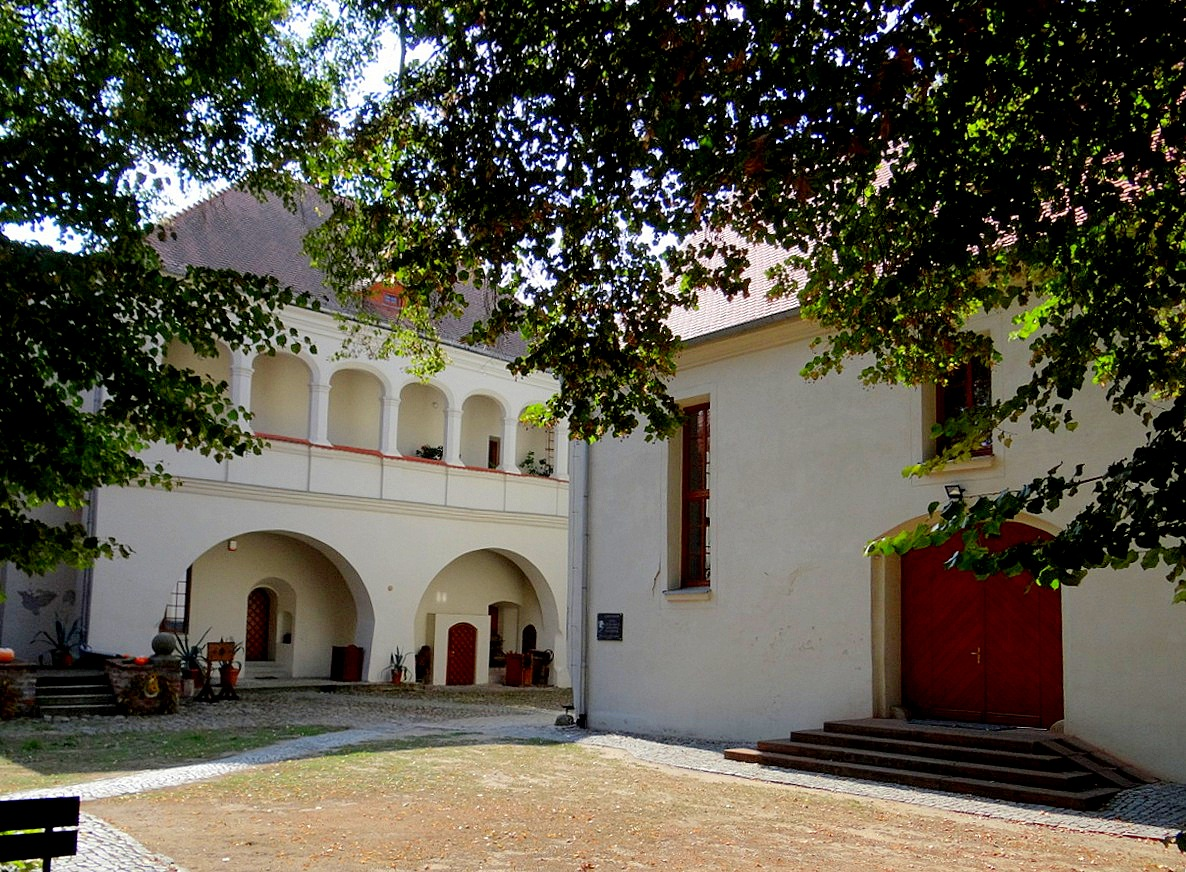
Piast Castle

The town was first mentioned as Crosno in 1005, when Duke Bolesław I Chrobry of Poland had a fortress built here in the course of his armed conflict with Emperor Henry II and the West Slavic Veleti confederation. Due to its strategic location as a point of passage across the Oder, it played an important role at the western border of the Polish kingdom with the Holy Roman Empire during the 11th to 13th centuries. As a result of the fragmentation of Poland, in 1163 Krosno was part of the Duchy of Silesia ruled by Bolesław I the Tall of the Silesian Piasts. In 1201 it received its town charter by Bolesław's son Duke Henry I the Bearded. Henry erected a stone castle at Krosno, where he died in 1238 and where his widow, Hedwig of Andechs, took refuge during the 1241 first Mongol invasion of Poland. When the Duchy of Wrocław was finally divided in 1251, the town became part of the newly created Duchy of Głogów under Konrad I.

The town changed hands several times; once it was given as payment to soldiers of the Ascanian margraves of Brandenburg. When the last Piast duke Henry XI of Głogów died without issue in 1476, his widow Barbara of Brandenburg, daughter of Elector Albert Achilles of Brandenburg, inherited the territory of Krosno. The Brandenburg influence met with fierce opposition by Henry's cousin Duke Jan II the Mad of Żagań, who devastated Krosno but in 1482 had to sign an agreement with Albert Achilles, who was able to retain the Krosno (Crossen) area. As a former part of the Duchy of Głogów it officially remained a lien of the Bohemian kingdom until in 1538 King Ferdinand I, renounced all rights to Krosno, thereby finalizing the district's belonging to the Neumark region of the Brandenburg margraviate.

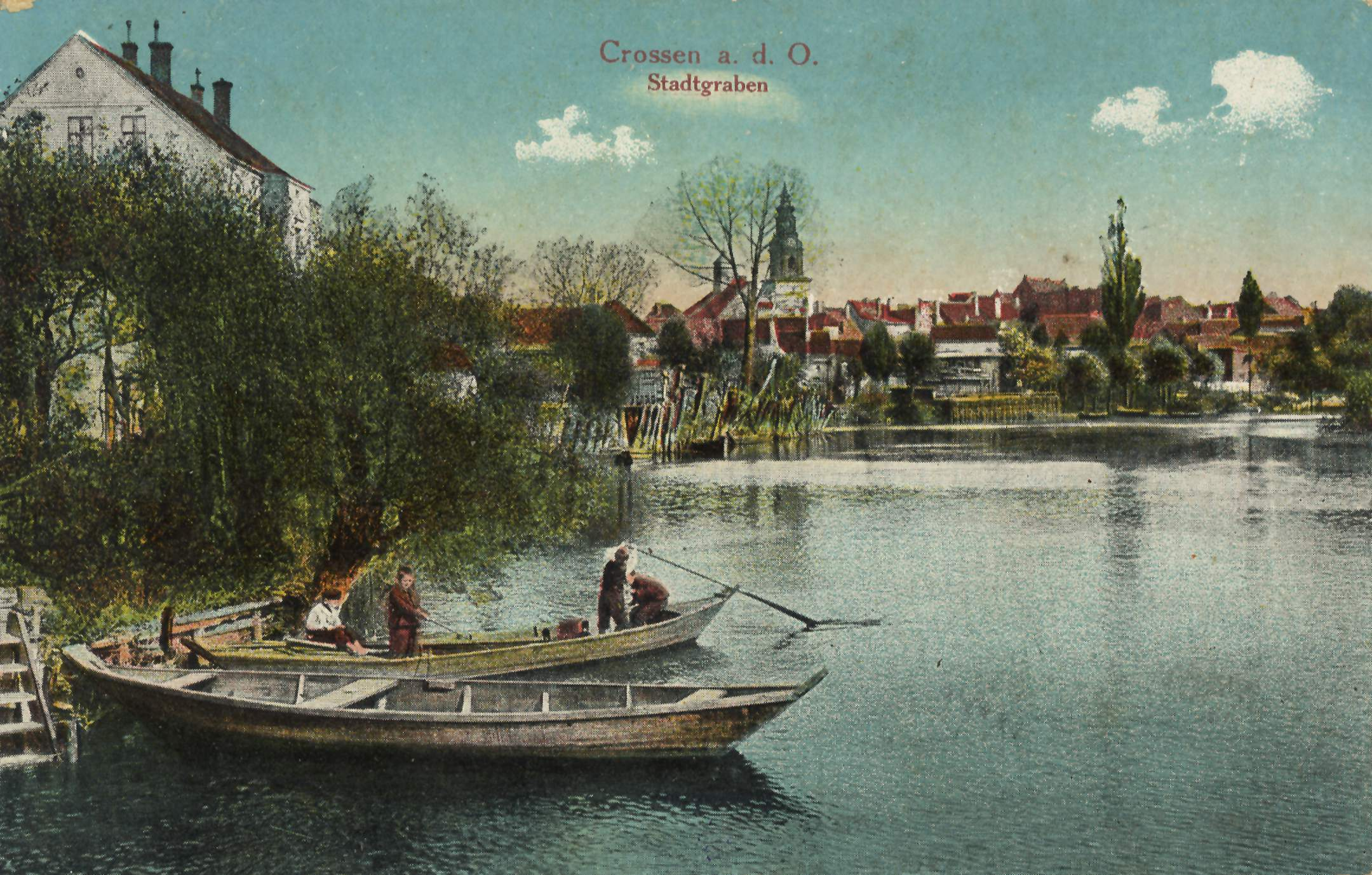
Postcard from 1918

With Brandenburg, Crossen became part of the Kingdom of Prussia in 1701. In reforms after the Napoleonic Wars, the town became part of the Province of Brandenburg in 1815 and was the seat of Landkreis Crossen as part of Regierungsbezirk Frankfurt. As a result of the Unification of Germany, it became part of the German Empire in 1871. In May 1886 the town was devastated by a whirlwind.

In 1945 during World War II, the town was conquered by the Soviet Red Army. After Germany's defeat in the war, the town once again became part of Poland. Already in March 1945 the town was claimed by the Polish state, with the assignment of the town being switched back and forth between Western Pomerania and Lower Silesia several times. On May 2, a group of Polish communists from Poznań arrived to assume administration of the town. The situation complicated when another group with 66 members arrived, who likewise intended to rule the town. By June 1945, conflicts between these groups had been resolved. The adjective Odrzańskie after the Oder river, upon which the town is situated, was added for distinction from other settlements of the same name in Poland, most notably the town of Krosno.

From 1975 to 1998, it was administratively located in the Zielona Góra Voivodeship.

== Demographics ==
Historical population

Year	Pop.	±%
1843	7,133	—
1871	7,431	+4.2%
1880	6,746	−9.2%
1890	6,657	−1.3%
1900	7,369	+10.7%

Year	Pop.	±%
1910	7,595	+3.1%
1925	7,364	−3.0%
1950	3,421	−53.5%
1960	6,611	+93.2%
2010	11,881	+79.7%

== Notable people ==
- Georg Wenzeslaus von Knobelsdorff (1699–1753) German painter and architect
- Alexander von Knobelsdorff (1723–1799), Prussian field marshal
- Christiane Becker-Neumann (1778–1797), German actress
- Eduard Seler (1849–1922), German anthropologist, archaeologist, philogian, and Mesoamerica scholar
- Rudolf Pannwitz (1881–1969), German author
- Alfred Henschke ps. Klabund (1890–1928), German author
- Siegfried Müller aka Kongo-Müller (1920–1983), German mercenary
- Aneta Konieczna (born 1978), canoe racer, Olympic medallist
- Tomasz Kuszczak (born 1982), footballer

== Twin towns – sister cities ==
See twin towns of Gmina Krosno Odrzańskie.
