= Troja (surname) =

Troja is a surname. Notable people with the surname include:

- Eleonora Troja, Italian astrophysicist
- Gaetano Troja (1944–2023), Italian footballer
- Michele Troja (1747–1827), Italian physician

== See also ==
- Troja (disambiguation)
- Troia (surname)
