= Navy Island, Jamaica =

Island in Jamaica

Navy Island
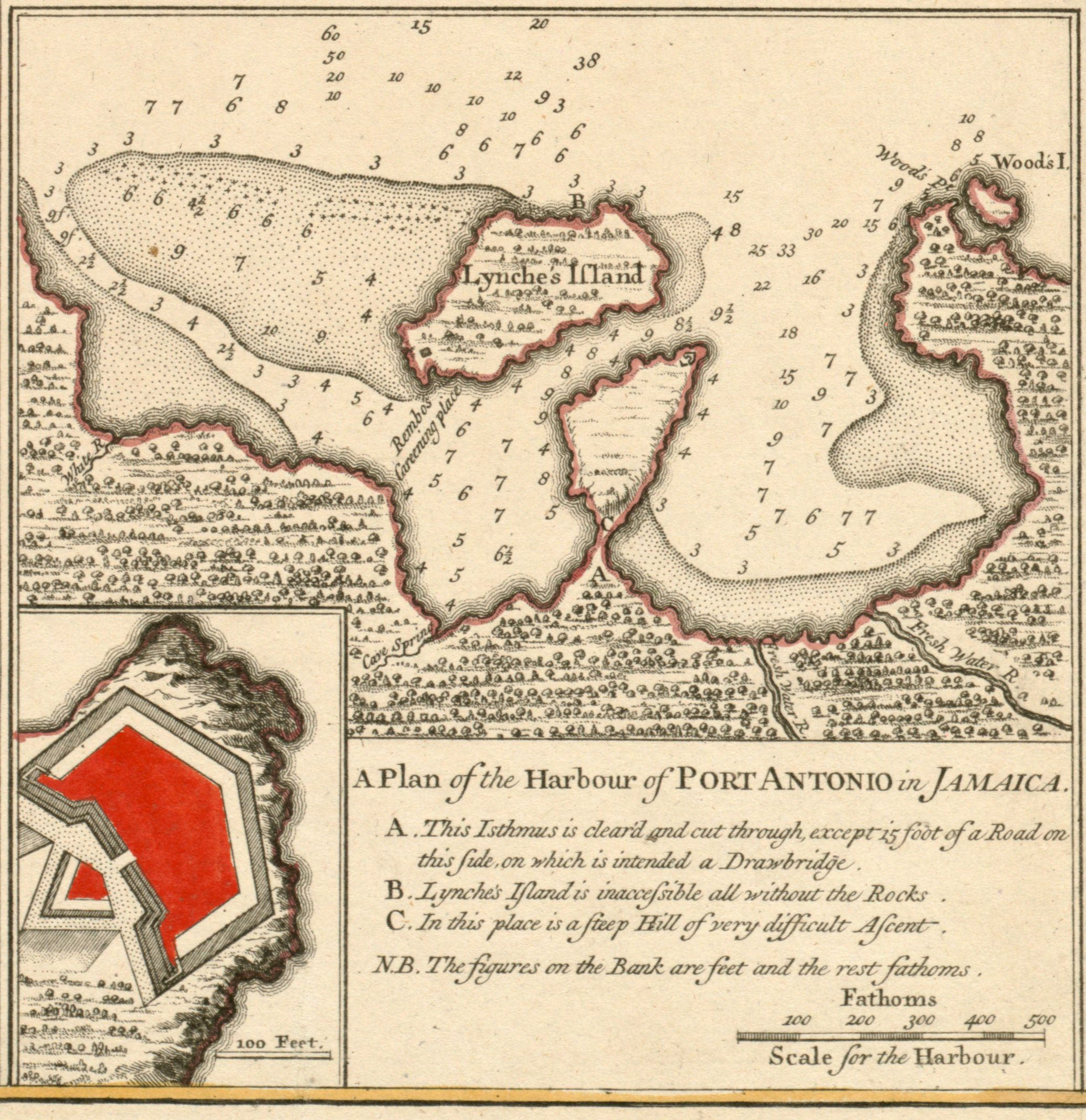
- Lynche's Island on 1745 map of Port Antonio

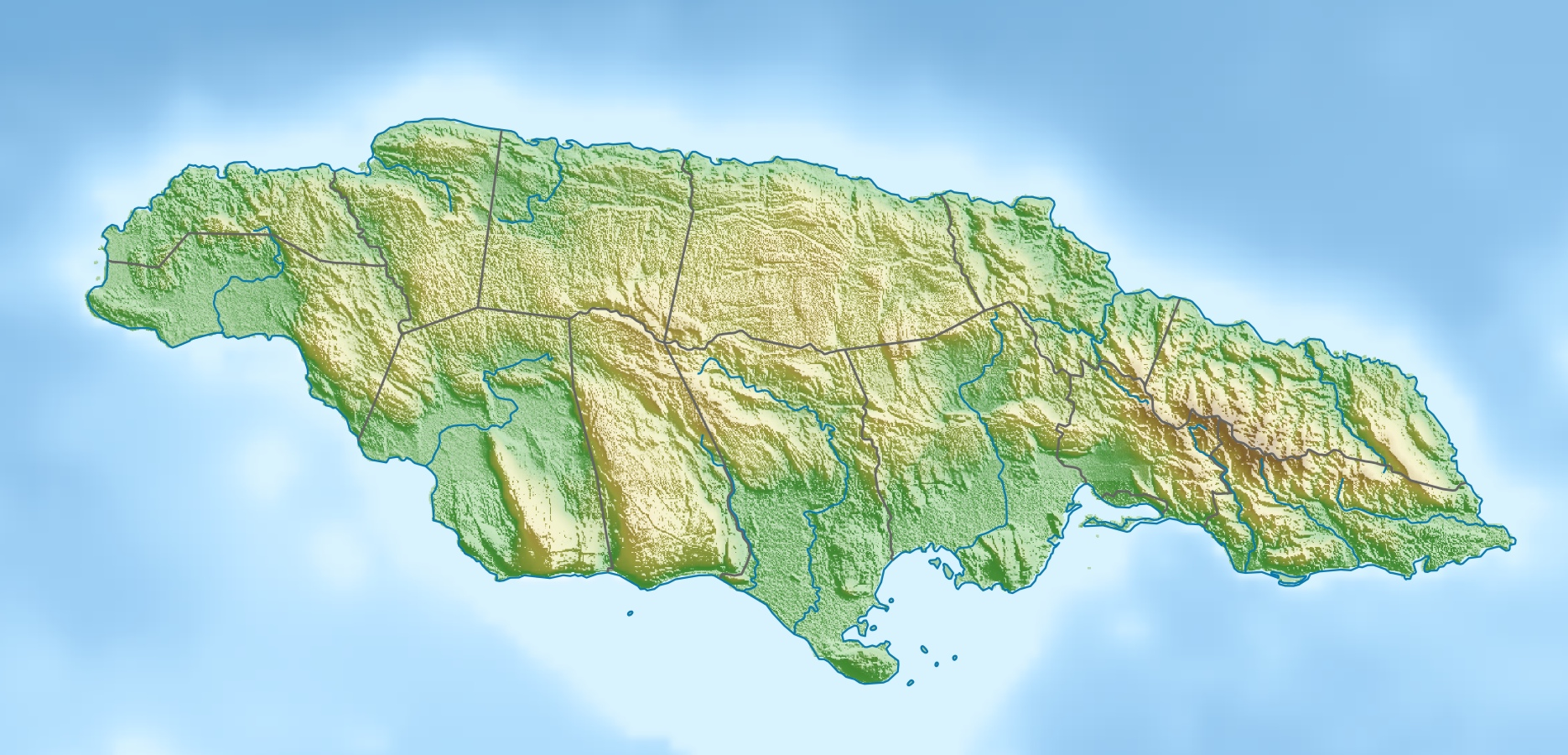
- Location within Jamaica Location within the Caribbean

Geography
- Location: Caribbean
- Coordinates: 18°11′14″N 76°27′12″W
- Area: 64 acres (26 ha)

Administration
- Jamaica
- Parish: Portland Parish

Navy Island is a small (64 acres) uninhabited island off the coast of Port Antonio in Portland Parish, Jamaica.

Navy Island's most famous owner was the film actor Errol Flynn, who reportedly hosted many parties there. Until fairly recently, the Island has been maintained as a resort community. However, it is now a closed island owned by the Government of Jamaica.

== History ==
The British Government originally gave the island to Governor Lynch of Jamaica for services to the Crown; it became known as "Lynch's Island". The Royal Navy later took over what was now called Navy island, using the facility for a gun battery at the eastern. At some point, Captain William Bligh of the Royal Navy did use the island shallows facing the mainland as a 'careening station" (when they turn the hulls of ships to make them available for scraping off barnacles and other maintenance).

In modern times, Flynn purchased Navy Island for his private retreat. He planted a long row of royal palms that are still there today. Flynn never built a house on Navy Island, but moored his yacht, "Zaca" near a thatch-covered structure built around an existing tree. Flynn's caretaker, known as the "Governor", lived in what was then the only house on the island.

Len Koutnik, a land developer from Los Angeles, purchased Navy Island and planned an upscale vacation retreat with homes under the aegis, "Jamaica Islandia". Pressed by the Government of Jamaica to begin construction, Koutnik was forced to lower his expectations for ultra posh accommodations. Harry Eiler and his wife, a California couple, built the first house there.

A few other investors added similar home sites. Joseph and Gertrude Casey from Rhode Island joined with Koutnik to build a hotel and surrounding rental villas. However, Koutnik ran out of funds and the Caseys took control of the project. However, the planned construction was never completed. After Joseph Casey's death, Gertrude Casey offered the Eilers a lease on the entire island so that they could complete construction and operate the only private island resort in Jamaica - The Admiralty Club.

After five years operating the Admiralty Club, the Eilers faced an employee rebellion. They had fired an employee for stealing funds. The man then fomented a rebellion against the Eilers by the resort staff. The staff took over the island and commandeered the two boats used to ferry guests to the island. They held the Eilers captive until the couple paid termination pay. After this experience, the Eilers immediately left Navy Island and left it to Gertrude Casey's supervision.

In time, other investors became interested in Navy Island. However, a legal stipulation required that anyone visiting the island be allowed to use the island amenities as a guest. In addition, there was a provision for a public beach amid the circle of rental villas. These requirements made Navy Island undesirable as an upscale resort and drove away investors.

In time, the Jamaican Government bought out all the remaining land titles and closed Navy Island. It remains undeveloped to this day.
