= Talma (magician) =

English magician

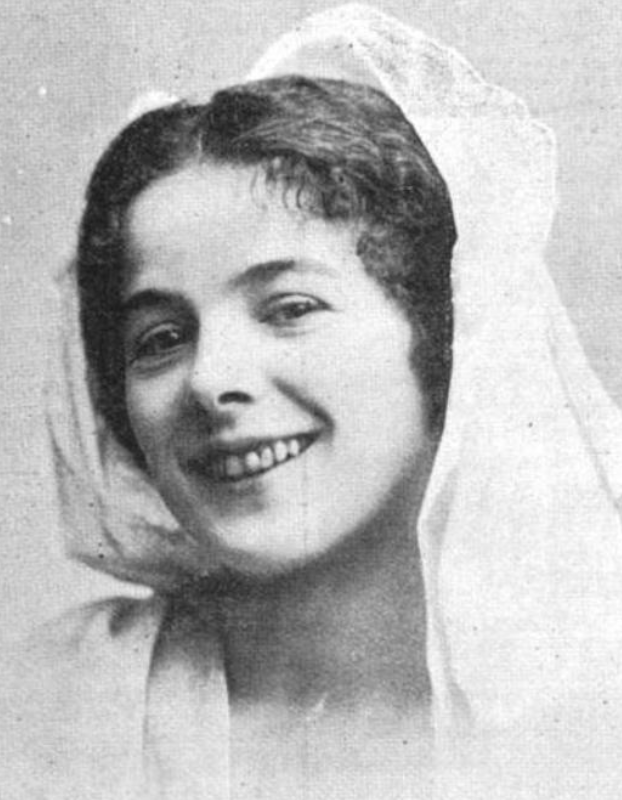
Talma, from a 1900 publication

Talma was the stage name of Mary Ann Ford (1861 – 13 July, 1944), the magician, who is best known for performing with her husband Servais Le Roy in the act "Le Roy, Talma & Bosco".

Ford was born in England, while her husband was Belgian. As a performer, she adopted the name Mercedes Talma, but was generally known just as Talma. When Talma was an assistant to a mind reader in London, she met Servais Le Roy, who was a sleight-of-hand artist. Talma and Le Roy were wed in 1890. Talma became accomplished at performing sleight of hand and manipulation acts, especially coin manipulation, and she was often billed as "The Queen of Coins".

Talma formed a long-running stage partnership with her husband and their colleague Leon Bosco. They named their act "The Comedians de Mephisto Co" but they were much better known as Le Roy, Talma & Bosco. Le Roy is credited with devising the Asrah levitation illusion, which he and Talma first performed in London in 1914. Talma performed sleight of hand for their show.

Photos
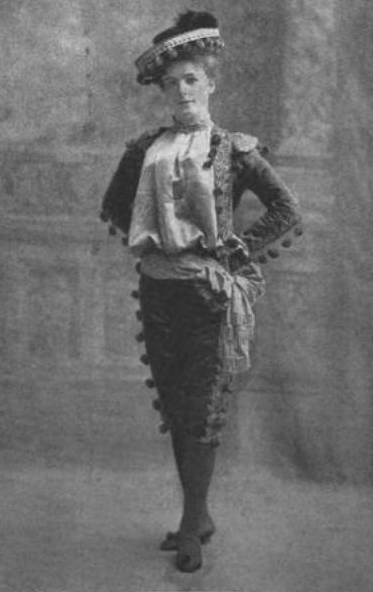
Talma, 1899

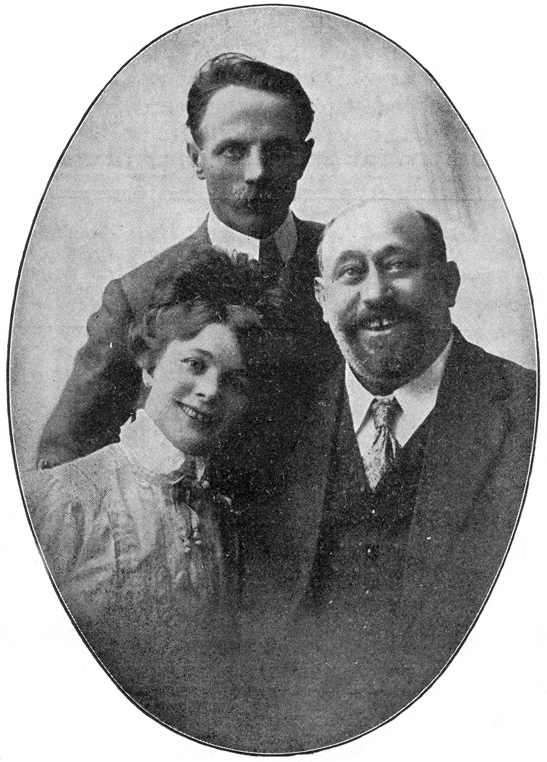
Le Roy, Talma, Bosco, 1912.
