= Troia (surname) =

Troia is a surname. Notable people with the surname include:

- Kathleen Troia McFarland (born 1951), American communications consultant
- Mariano Tullio Troia (1933–2010), member of the Sicilian Mafia
- Oliviero Troia (born 1994), Italian cyclist
- Vinny Troia, American cybersecurity researcher

== See also ==
- Troia (disambiguation)
- Troja (surname)
