= Portland Parish =

Parish of Jamaica

Coordinates: 18°08′N 76°32′W

Portland Puotlan
- Parish
- Portland in Jamaica
- Country: Jamaica
- County: Surrey
- Capital: Port Antonio
- Major towns: Buff Bay

Area
  - Total: 814 km^{2} (314 sq mi)
  - Rank: 7

Population (2012)
  - Total: 82,183
  - Density: 101/km^{2} (261/sq mi)

Portland (Jamaican Patois: Puotlan), with its capital town Port Antonio, is a parish located on Jamaica's northeast coast. It is situated to the north of St Thomas and to the east of St Mary in Surrey County. It is one of the rural areas of Jamaica, containing part of the Blue Mountains, where the Jamaican Maroon communities of Moore Town and Charles Town are located.

== Geography and demography ==
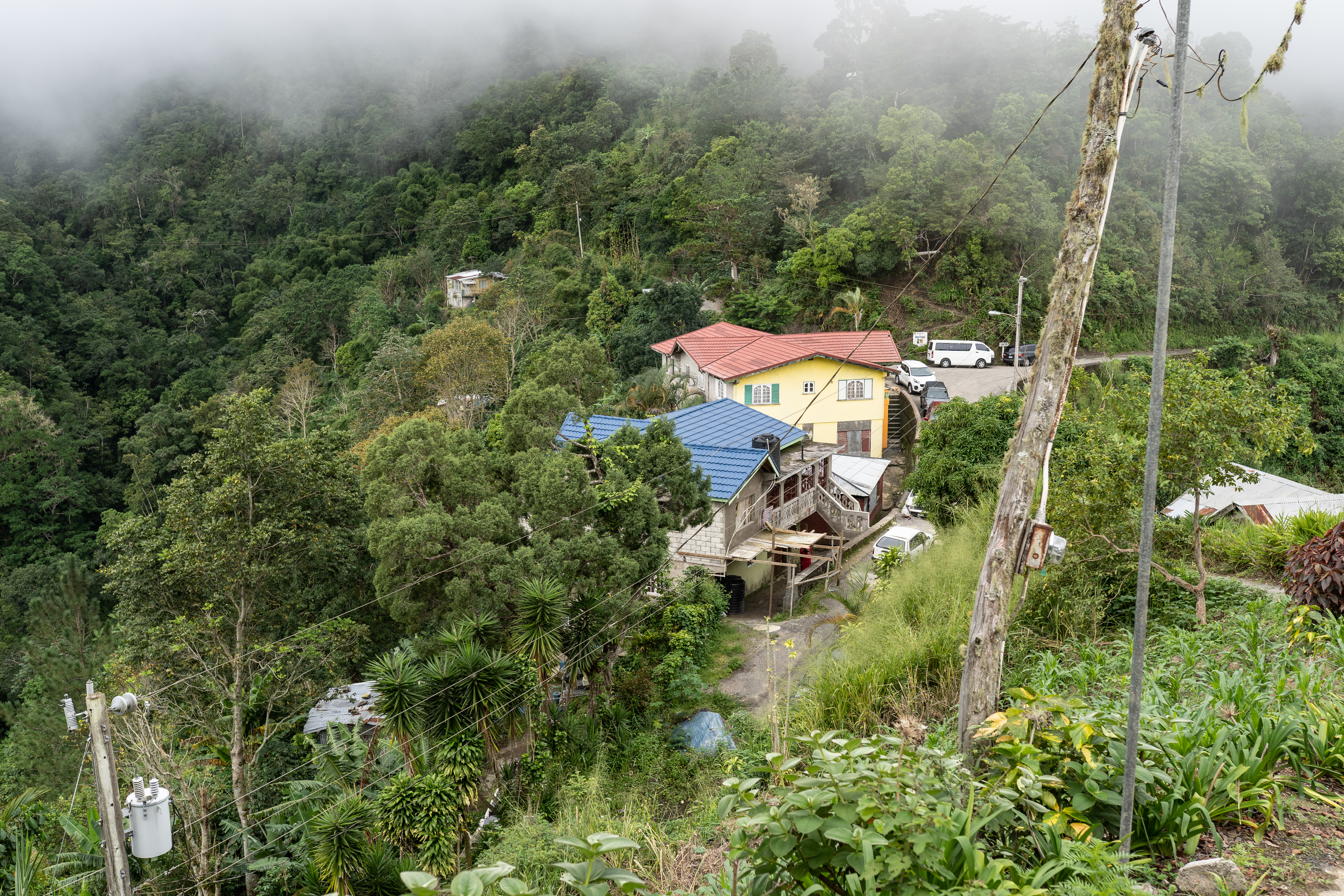
Fog hangs over the village of Section in the Blue Mountains of Portland Parish

The parish is situated at latitude 18°10' N and longitude 75°27'W. It extends from the highest peaks of the Blue Mountains, 2,256 metres (7,402 ft) above sea level, down to the north coast, and is noted for its fertile soil, scenery, and beaches. The parish lies in the direct path of the northeast trade winds, and the Blue Mountain ridge to its south traps the moisture. This parish has the highest rainfall in the island. Port Antonio, its chief town and capital, has two harbours, the western one being sheltered by a small islet, Navy Island. Portland covers an area of 814 square kilometers, making it Jamaica's seventh-largest parish.

The parish has a variety of complex landforms; the entire coastline is dotted with caves, bays, rivers, waterfalls and hills. There are fourteen caves, which include those at Buff Bay, Orange Bay, Hope Bay, Port Antonio, Boston Bay, Long Bay, Innis Bay and Nonsuch. There are also 17 rivers which form a network throughout the parish. The largest are the Rio Grande, Buff Bay and Hectors rivers.

The population of Portland is an estimated 82,183, 15,000 of whom live in the capital town. Its people are 89.8% black, 1.2% white, 5.3% Asians, 2.6% mixed race, and 1.1% other. It includes the separate Maroon communities of Charles Town, Jamaica and Moore Town.

== Commerce ==
=== Agriculture ===
The parish is a leading producer of bananas, coconuts, breadfruits, coffee, mangoes and ackee which are grown for export as well as local consumption. Portland has very rich land on its coastal strips that is suitable for any kind of cultivation, so many domestic crops are grown. Manufacturing is a small sector of the economy, with about 18 factories. They also do farming.

=== Tourism ===
A number of tourist facilities exist in the area, including Trident Villas and Hotel, Jamaica Palace, Dragon Bay Villas, Goblin Hill Hotel, Jamaica Crest, Fern Hill Club, and Mocking Bird Hill.

==== Attractions ====
Because of its natural and peaceful environment, tourism has often flourished in the parish. It is noted for its beaches, such as Frenchman's Cove, Boston Beach, Winifred, and Dragon Bay. The Blue Mountains are also located in Portland; two Maroon communities are located there. The internationally known Blue Lagoon is in this parish; it is believed to be the crater of an extinct volcano. The lagoon is an almost landlocked cove with approximately 55 m (180 ft) of water. Rafting on the Rio Grande is also a tourist attraction.

Boston Jerk Centre in Portland is an area well known for its "jerked" foods, including chicken, fish and pork. Jerked foods are foods made with Jamaican jerk spice and traditional technique.

=== Other activities ===
Since the early 1950s, more than 782 film or screen productions have been shot in Portland. Two of the most popular are 20,000 Leagues Under the Sea, by Walt Disney (USA) in 1954 and The Harder They Come by Vista Productions (Jamaica) in 1972. Scenes from the film Cocktail, starring Tom Cruise, were shot at the bar on the beach at the Dragon Bay resort. An early film edition of the 1963 version of Lord of the Flies was largely shot at Frenchman's Cove; the 1990 remake by Harry Hook was filmed at Frenchman's Cove and Snow Hill. Barbadian singer Rihanna filmed the video for her song "Man Down" in various locations throughout the parish in April/May 2011. American singer Santigold filmed the video for her song "Disparate Youth" in the parish. The video was released in March 2012.

== Politics ==
Portland Parish is part of two parliamentary constituencies; Portland Eastern and Portland Western.

== Places ==
=== Towns ===
- Boston
- Buff Bay
- Cattawood Springs
- Charles Town, Jamaica
- Coopers Hill
- Drapers
- Fellowship
- Fruitful Vale
- Hope Bay
- Long bay
- Manchioneal
- Moore Town
- Mount Pleasant
- Norwich
- Port Antonio, Capital
- Shrewsbury
- Snow Hill
- St. Margaret's Bay

=== Rivers ===
- Buff Bay River
- Daniels River
- Danny River
- Hectors River
- Reach Falls
- Rio Grande
- Somerset Falls
- Spanish River
- Swift River

=== Islands ===
- Christmas Island
- Navy Island, Jamaica
- Pelew (Monkey) Island
- Ship Rock Island (Lord of the Flies, 1992)
- Wood Island

=== Beaches ===
- Boston Beach
- Frenchman's Cove
- Long Bay Beach
- Pt. Antonio Pier
- San San Beach
- San shy Beach
- Titchfield beach
- Winifred's Beach

== Notable residents ==
- Sir Harold Allan (1895 – 1953) – Jamaican statesman and cabinet minister.
- Sir Patrick Allen (born 1951) – Jamaican statesman and incumbent governor-general.
- Edward Baugh (1936–2023) – Jamaican writer and lecturer.
- Errol Flynn (1909–1959) – Australian actor.
- Rubina Ann Guscott (1900–2002) – Jamaican civil rights activist, feminist and NAACP member.
- Evan Jones (1929–2023) – Jamaican writer.
- Fred M. Jones (1890–1971) – Jamaican planter, philanthropist and custos rotulorum.
- Ken Jones (1924–1964) – Jamaican politician and cabinet minister.
- Rustie Lee (born 1949) – Jamaican television personality, television chef, actress, singer and former politician.
- Duke Reid (1915–1975) – Jamaican disc jockey and record producer.
- Roy Reid (1937–2009) – Jamaican painter.
- Patrice Wymore (1926–2014) – American actress.
- Peter-Paul Zahl (1944–2011) – German writer and anarchist.
