= Roy Reid =

Jamaican painter

- Born: Roy Reid; 21 December 1937; Portland, Jamaica
- Died: 10 January 2009 (aged 71); Olympic Gardens, St. Andrew, Jamaica
- Known for: Artist

Roy Reid (21 December 1937 – 10 January 2009) was a Jamaican painter active from 1968 to 2009. He was best known for his paintings depicting the Jamaican people and dress and those with themes of devastation such as fires, which often have moral and spiritual meaning.

== Biography ==
Born in Portland, Jamaica, Reid was born to farming parents but dropped out of school at the age of 11 because he couldn't read, only learning later at the age of 34 by reading the bible. He later moved to Kingston to pursue a career.

Reid was regarded in his native country as one of the important figures among Jamaican 'intuitive' artists, generally those who are outsiders of the main schools of artistic activity and social circles on the island, especially as he was self-taught. Reid has made many notable exhibitions of his artwork, the Self Taught Artist Exhibition at the Institute of Jamaica in 1971, Eight Jamaican Primitives in Havana, Cuba in 1976; The Intuitive Eye at the National Gallery of Jamaica in 1979, the Jamaican Intuitives in Wolverhampton, England and a Caribbean exhibition at the Un Nouveau Regard sur Les Caribes at Courbevoie, France in 1992. As from the National Gallery, in Jamaica he has given various exhibitions at Makonde Gallery, Pegasus Hotel in 1981, Bolivar Gallery in 1982 and the Mutual Life Gallery in 1987.

Reid also exhibited his artwork at the annual national exhibition of the National Gallery between December 2000 to February 2001, displaying his paintings The Unforgettable Defenceless Street People Removal and Everyone has a Cross to Bear.

Reid was also a credited author of art books and magazines, including Modern Jamaican Art, Art Today and the magazine Revue Noire.

In April 2005, Reid's art studio and several rooms of his house in Grass Quit Glades, Kingston were gutted by fire.

== Death ==
Reid was found dead in the workshop of his St. Andrew home by his wife Mabel Reid on the morning of 10 January 2009. At the time, Reid was said to be suffering from prostate cancer, an enlarged heart and diabetes.
