= Troja (singer) =

American singer and actress

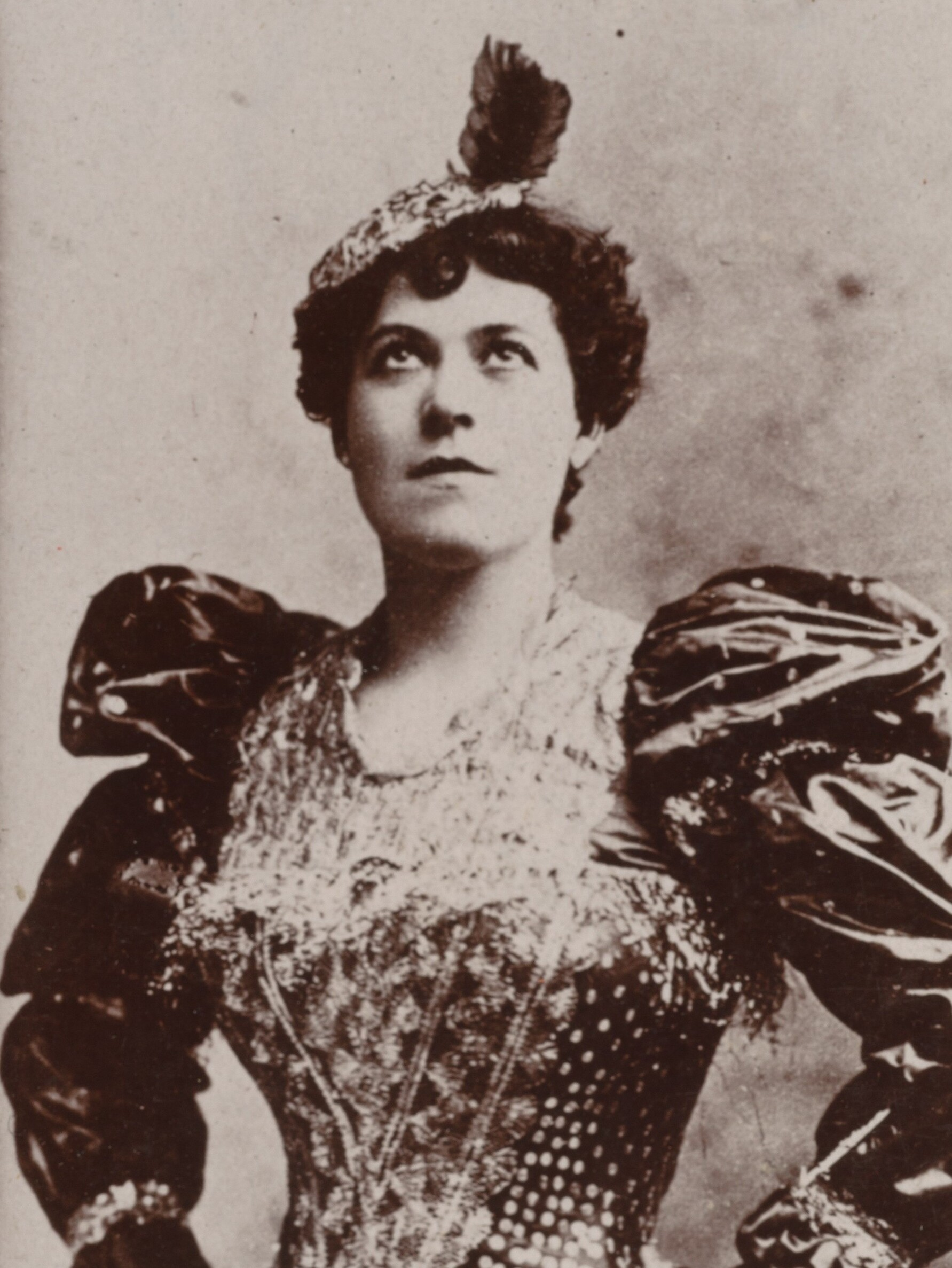

Troja was a musical theatre performer in New York City in the 1890s and early 20th century. An 1894 advertisement commented that she was a serio-comic singer. Other items described her as a singing comedienne who is clever, and droll.

== Comic singer ==
She performed at the Central Opera House Music Hall, Sixty-Seventh Street and Third Avenue (Manhattan-Bronx), on the east side of Manhattan (New York), in April 1894. The building was built in 1889 at a cost of $800,000. It was remodeled for an additional expense of $150,000 so that it seated 1,500 people. A New York Times piece announcing Troja as the star on a bill at the same venue, in May, describes the entertainment as high-class vaudeville.

At Koster & Bial's Music Hall, 135 West 34th Street (Manhattan), Troja was part of a variety show in June 1894. Other acts included Mlle. Naomi, equilibrist, Mlle. Lalo, female bicyclist, and the living pictures of Oscar Hammerstein. In June 1895 she introduced six new songs as the main attraction of an American Theatre Roof Garden, Bowery, show. On stormy nights presentations were given in the theatre.

The Bohemia Roof Garden stood opposite the Marlborough Hotel at Broadway (Manhattan) and 36th Street. Extensive renovations were required to be made to the building before it was opened to the public for performances on July 3, 1895. Owners, Levinson and Steinreich, secured some of New York's leading talent to entertain as well as a splendid orchestra. Troja joined Al Wilson, Sam Bernard, a great mirror dancer named Pepinta, Maud Raymond, Cushman and Holcomb, David Warfield, and Imro Fox among the varied bill offered by the theatrical venue.

The Trocadero opened in March 1896 as a refurbishment of Koster & Bial's old place. Troja was engaged for the opening performance for which a new stage had been added along with new management. Mlle. Dumont, a chanteuse eccentrique, and Mignonette, a dancer, were among the other acts.

She was with actor and violoncello player Auguste van Biene at Hammerstein's Olympia Music Hall, Broadway between 44th Street and 45th Street, in January 1897. During the same month she took part in a benefit for Sam Weston, a blind minstrel, given at the Fifth Avenue (Manhattan) Theatre. Marie Dressler, Verona Jarbeau, and Bessie Bonehill also participated. At the end of January Troja and Van Biene were at the Olympia Music Hall, Broadway between 44th and 45th Streets, with Little Egypt (dancer) and Minnie Renwood.

The Pleasure Palace, East 58th Street between Third Avenue (Manhattan) and Lexington Avenue (Manhattan), was managed by F.F. Proctor. Troja was on a bill there in October 1897. Entertainment included singing, dancing, and acrobatics.

Sam T. Jack's Theatre was a burlesque house on State Street (Chicago) and Madison Street (Chicago) in Chicago, Illinois. Troja appeared there with Emma Carus and Jennie Yeamans in June 1898.
