= Troja railway station =

Jamaica train station

Troja
- The station c. 1896

General information
- Coordinates: 18.204154°N 76.92701°W
- Owner: Jamaica Railway Corporation
- Line: Bog Walk to Port Antonio branch line
- Platforms: Single

History
- Opened: 1896
- Closed: 1978; since vandalised
Location
- Location within Jamaica

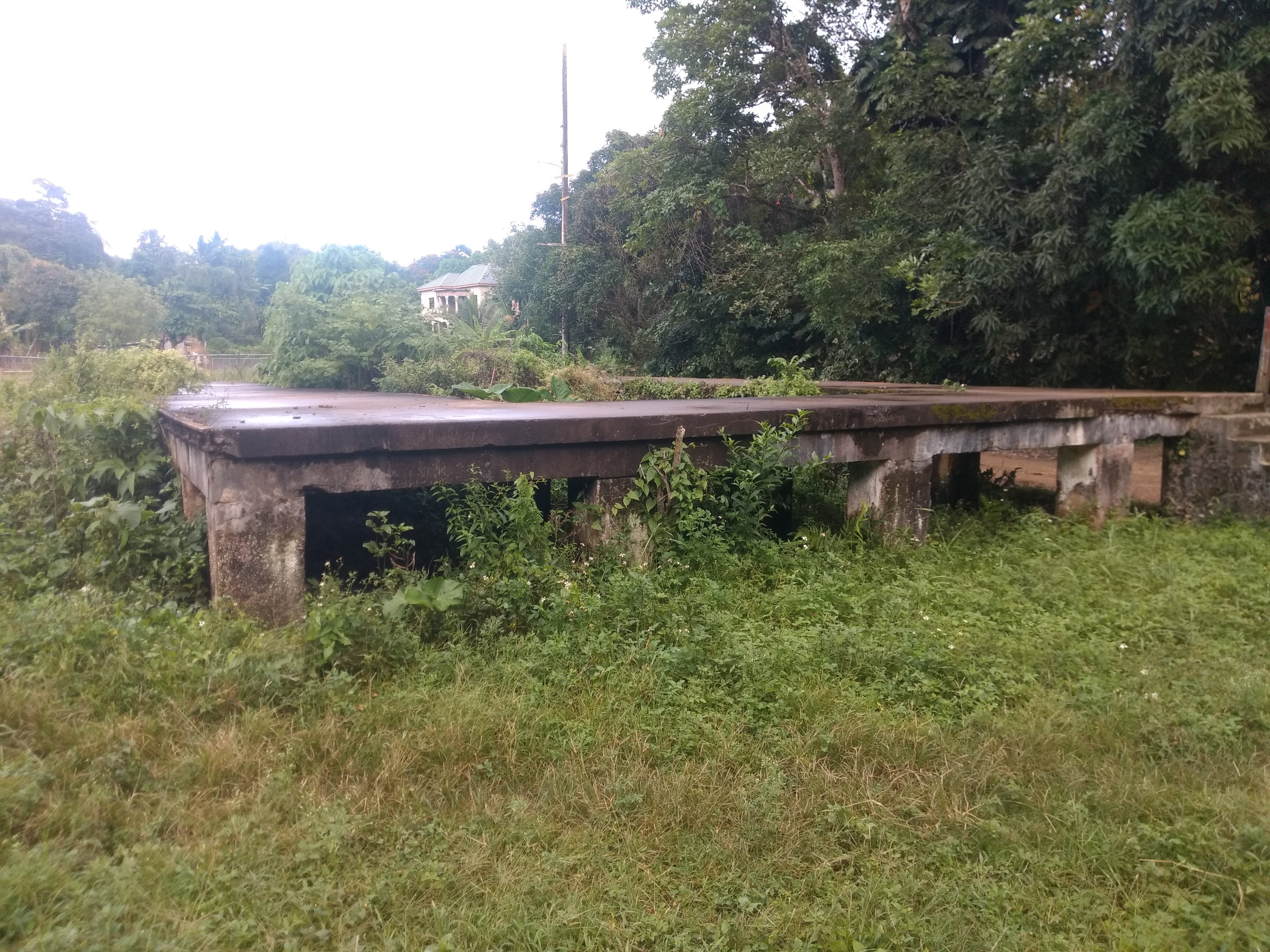
Image of the remains of the Troja Railway Station as seen December 2021

Troja railway station opened in 1896, closed in 1975, reopened in 1977 and closed for good in 1978. It was on the Bog Walk to Port Antonio branch line, 31 miles (50 km) from the Kingston terminus (in Jamaica), and served the surrounding agricultural community, providing a means for bananas to reach and be exported from Port Antonio. It was vandalised some time after closure.

== Architecture ==
The station was a two-story wooden building with sash windows, the upper floor being smaller than the lower and centrally placed. The pitched roof over the ground floor was extended to form a canopy over the platform on all four sides of the building. The upper story had a gable end roof.

== Track layout ==
In addition to the platform serving the through line there was a second platform on the opposite side of the station building on a passing loop and, most likely, freight sidings as well.

== Fares ==
In 1910 the third class fare from Troja to Kingston was 2/6 (two shillings and sixpence); first class was about double.

== See also ==
- Railways of Jamaica
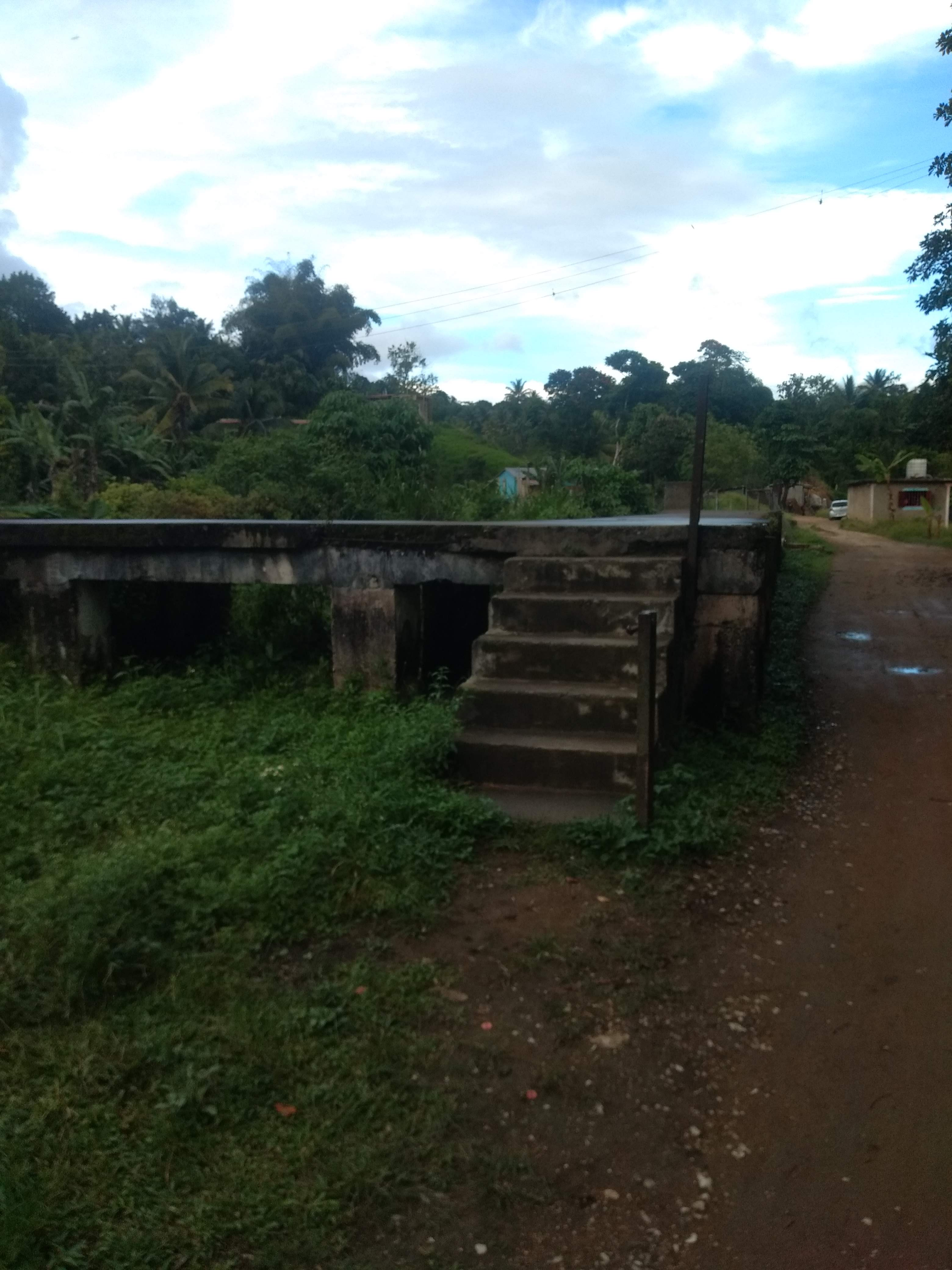
- Another image showing the station as it stands in December 2021.
  Railway stations in Jamaica

== Bibliography ==
- Satchell, Veront M & Sampson, Cezley (2003), The rise and fall of railways in Jamaica 1845-1975, The Journal of Transport History, archived from the original on November 2, 2007
