= Christiane Becker =

German actress (1778–1797)

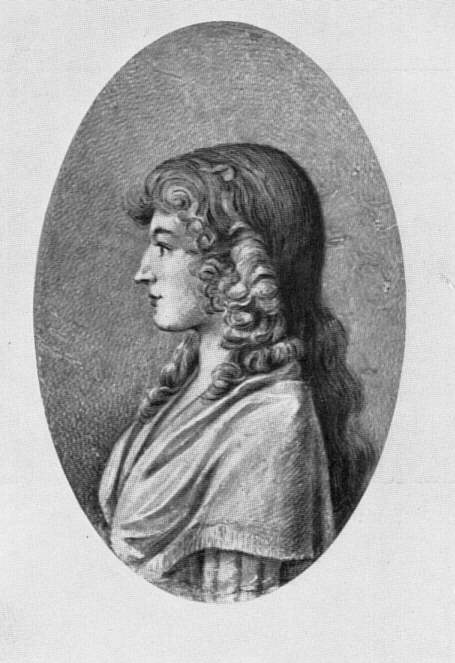
Christiane Becker-Neumann, by Johann Heinrich Lips, 1793

Christiane Becker (née Christiane Luise Amalie Neumann; 15 December 1778 – 22 September 1797) was a German actress.

== Life ==
She was born in Crossen-an-der-Oder, in the Kingdom of Prussia (now Krosno Odrzańskie, Poland), daughter of a theatrical manager and dramatic poet, Johann Christian Neumann. She made her first stage appearance in 1787 at Weimar. Here, she received some training from Goethe and from Corona Schröter, the singer, and her beauty and charm made her the favourite both of court and public. She married actor Heinrich Becker in 1793.

Her last part was that of Euphrosyne in the opera Das Petermännchen, and it is under this name that Goethe immortalized her in a poem which first appeared in Schiller's Musen Almanach of 1799.

She died of tuberculosis in 1797. The Euphrosyne-Denkmal (Euphrosyne Memorial), erected in Rosenberg (now Olesno) and moved to Weimar in 1950, was built in her honour.
