= Bog Walk to Port Antonio railway =

Railway in Jamaica

The Bog Walk to Port Antonio railway was a railway in Jamaica built to serve the banana, cacao, citrus and coconut districts of St Catherine, St Mary and Portland.

== Construction, operation and closure ==
The railway operated from 1896 to 1978. It was temporarily closed from 1975 to 1977. The line was 54 miles (87 km) long.

== Gradients ==
The ruling gradient was 1 in 63 with the line climbing approximately 550 feet (170 m) in 18 miles (29 km) (average gradient 1 in 173) from Bog Walk (approximately 250 feet (76 m)) to its summit at Highgate (approximately 800 feet (240 m)) then descending approximately 750 feet (230 m) in just 9 miles (14 km) (average gradient 1 in 63) to the Wag Water Bridge (just above sea level) and continuing for another 27 miles (43 km) more or less on the level and along the coast to Port Antonio.

== Stations and Halts ==
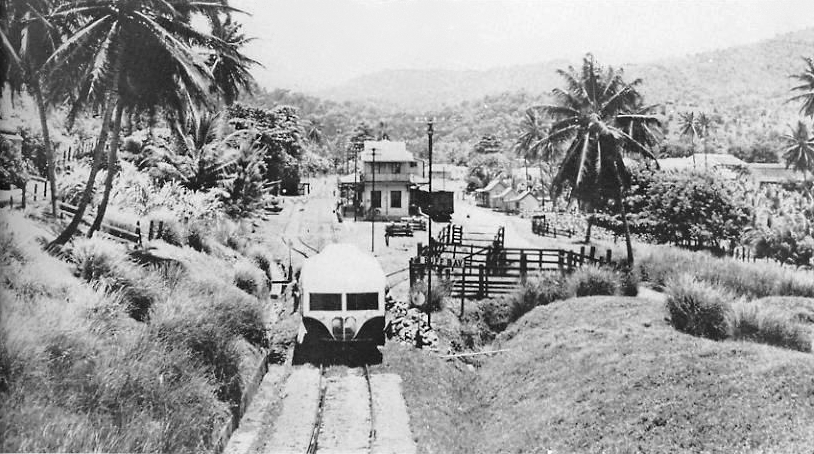
Buff Bay Station in 1960.

There were 13 stations and 15 halts:

- Bog Walk Station - Terminus
- Crawle Halt
- Riversdale Station
- Harewood Halt
- Darling Spring Halt
- Troja railway station
- Taja Halt
- Richmond Station
- Highgate Station
- Baughs Halt
- Esher Station
- Albany railway station
- Belfield Halt
- Grays Inn Halt
- Fort George Halt
- Annotto Bay Station
- Fort Stewart Halt
- Windsor Castle Halt
- Buff Bay Station
- Spring Garden Halt
- Orange Bay Station
- Hope Bay Station
- Robertson's Halt
- Saint Margaret's Bay Station
- Snow Hill Halt
- Passley Gardens Halt
- Norwich Halt
- Port Antonio Terminus

== Tunnels ==
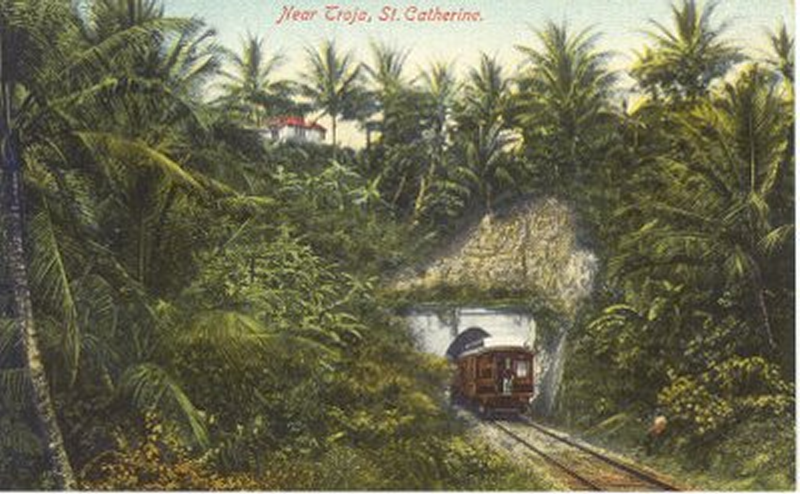
Rear of a train entering a tunnel near Troja c1896.

There were 17 tunnels:

| Tunnel | Approximate length |
|---|---|
| Riversdale | 150 metres (160 yards) |
| Harewood | 150 metres (160 yards) |
| Darling Spring | 200 metres (220 yards) |
| Cromwell Mountain #1 | 75 metres (82 yards) |
| Cromwell Mountain #2 | 270 metres (300 yards) |
| Cromwell Mountain #3 | 150 metres (160 yards) |
| Cromwell Mountain #4 | 100 metres (110 yards) |
| Cromwell Mountain #5 | 150 metres (160 yards) |
| Cromwell Mountain #6 | 200 metres (220 yards) |
| Cromwell Mountain #7 | 175 metres (191 yards) |
| Taja | 250 metres (270 yards) |
| Flint River | 250 metres (270 yards) |
| Richmond | 150 metres (160 yards) |
| Rock Hill | 150 metres (160 yards) |
| Hope Bay #1 | 225 metres (246 yards) |
| Hope Bay #2 | 50 metres (55 yards) |
| Hope Bay #3 | 100 metres (110 yards) |

== Bridges ==
There were ten significant bridges. Approximate bridge lengths are shown in the route diagram to the right.

- B2 & River Doro at Darling Spring/Troja
- Orange River at Richmond
- Wagwater River
- Pencar River
- Dry River
- White River
- Buff Bay River
- Spanish River
- Swift River
- Rio Grande

== Bibliography ==
- Satchell, Veront M & Sampson, Cezley (2003), The rise and fall of railways in Jamaica 1845-1975, The Journal of Transport History, archived from the original on November 2, 2007

== See also ==
- Railways of Jamaica
