= Heinrich Becker =

German actor (1770–1822)

Heinrich Becker (1770–1822) was a German actor l. His true surname was reportedly Blumenthal.

== Biography ==
He was born at Berlin, and obtained, while quite a young man, an appointment in the court theatre at Weimar, at that time under Goethe's auspices. The poet recognized his talent, appointed him stage manager, entrusted him with several of the leading roles in his dramas and consulted him in all matters connected with the staging of his plays.

For many years Becker was the favourite of the Weimar stage, and although he was at his best in comedy, he played, to Goethe's great satisfaction, Vansen in Egmont, and was also seen to great advantage in the leading parts of several of Schiller's plays; notably Burleigh in Maria Stuart, Karl Moor in Die Räuber, and Antonio in Torquato Tasso.

Becker left Weimar in the spring of 1809, played for a short time at Hamburg (under Schröder) and at Breslau, and then began a wandering life, now joining travelling companies, now playing at provincial theatres. Broken in health and ruined in fortune he returned in 1820 to Weimar, where he was again cordially received by Goethe, who reinstated him at the theatre. After playing for two years with indifferent success, he died at Weimar in 1822.

Becker was twice married. His first wife, Christiane, was also an actor.
