= Rubina Ann Guscott =

Jamaican-born American community leader and activist

- Born: 1900
- Died: October 1, 2002 (aged 101–102)

Rubina Ann "Ruby" Guscott was a Jamaican-born American community leader and activist known for her involvement in civil rights, social justice, and advocacy for racial and gender equality.

== Early life ==
Guscott was born and raised in Portland, Jamaica. In 1920, she moved to Roxbury, Boston, where she worked as a domestic worker in the home of a professor at the Harvard University School of Economics. A year later, she married Frank Henry Guscott, a Jamaican who served on the Banana boat (ship)—fast ships that transported bananas from tropical regions to North America and Europe. Together, they had six children: Christel R. Watson, Cecil H., Norman, George, Charles, and Kenneth I. Guscott, a former president of the National Association for the Advancement of Colored People (NAACP) Boston Branch.

At 30, she was widowed and supported her family during the Great Depression by taking various jobs, while her children contributed by selling other items. In the 1940s, she received her high school diploma from Old Boston Central High School.

== Activist life ==
In the 1920s, Rubina Guscott participated in weekly marches with the Black Star Nurses, an organization associated with the movement led by Marcus Garvey, a Jamaican activist who mobilized millions to pursue Black pride and equal rights. The Black Star Nurses marched through Boston dressed in white uniforms with hoods resembling those of traditional nurses.

In the 1930s, Guscott was an active member of the Planned Parenthood League of Massachusetts, a state branch of the Planned Parenthood Federation of America (PPFA), which provided reproductive and sexual healthcare as well as education in the United States. She regularly attended services at both St. Augustine Church on East Lenox Street and Metropolitan Baptist Church on Shawmut Avenue.

Guscott was active at the Robert Gould Shaw House, a community center in Lower Roxbury, Massachusetts, that offered educational and recreational programs and connected residents with resources and services. Guscott worked alongside other prominent West Indian women in the Roxbury Black community, including Melnea Cass, Edith Bynoe, and Elma Lewis. The Shaw House also operated Breezy Meadows Camp in Holliston, Massachusetts, where Guscott sent her children and where other underprivileged youth from the area spent two weeks each summer.

After the death of her son during World War II, Guscott joined the Massachusetts American Gold Star Mothers, an organization that honors mothers who have lost children in military service. She later served a term as president of the group.

In the 1940s, Guscott and a group of West Indian women established the Boston Progressive Credit Union at 1095 Tremont Street. It operated as a mutual aid society for Black women in Roxbury. Members contributed 50 cents weekly to a shared fund, with one member receiving the pooled amount every month or two to purchase household necessities. This rotating savings practice, known in Caribbean communities as "The Partnership," offered an alternative to high-interest loans by giving members accessible and interest-free funds when needed.

During the 1960s, Guscott participated in several trips with the NAACP, engaging in national efforts to advance civil rights and racial equality.

== Later years ==
Rubina Guscott's sons—Kenneth, George, and Cecil Guscott—founded the Long Bay Management Company in 1971. The company aimed to revitalize neglected housing in Roxbury by transforming dilapidated buildings into thousands of affordable housing units. The Guscott brothers launched their first project with a 17-unit apartment building and, by the early 2000s, owned over 3,000 housing units. Long Bay Management employed more than 80 percent minority workers across construction, subcontracting, architecture, and other services.

Rubina Guscott was the chairwoman until her death. As children of Jamaican immigrants, the Guscott brothers honored their heritage by naming developments after Jamaican locations, such as Morant Bay and Hope Bay. Kenneth Guscott was later appointed Boston's first honorary consul for Jamaica, working to strengthen cultural and economic ties between Boston and Jamaica.

In her later years, Rubina Guscott continued to travel internationally on NAACP tours, remaining active in the civil rights movement well into her nineties.

== Legacy ==
In recognition of her lifelong commitment to social activism, Casa Myrna—a nonprofit organization dedicated to addressing dating and domestic violence—named its new headquarters the Rubina Ann Guscott Building. The facility was developed in part by Kenneth and Cecil Guscott.

In 2023, Guscott was recognized as one of "Boston’s most admired, beloved, and successful Black Women leaders" by the Black Women Lead project.
