= Servais Le Roy =

Belgian magician, illusion designer and businessman

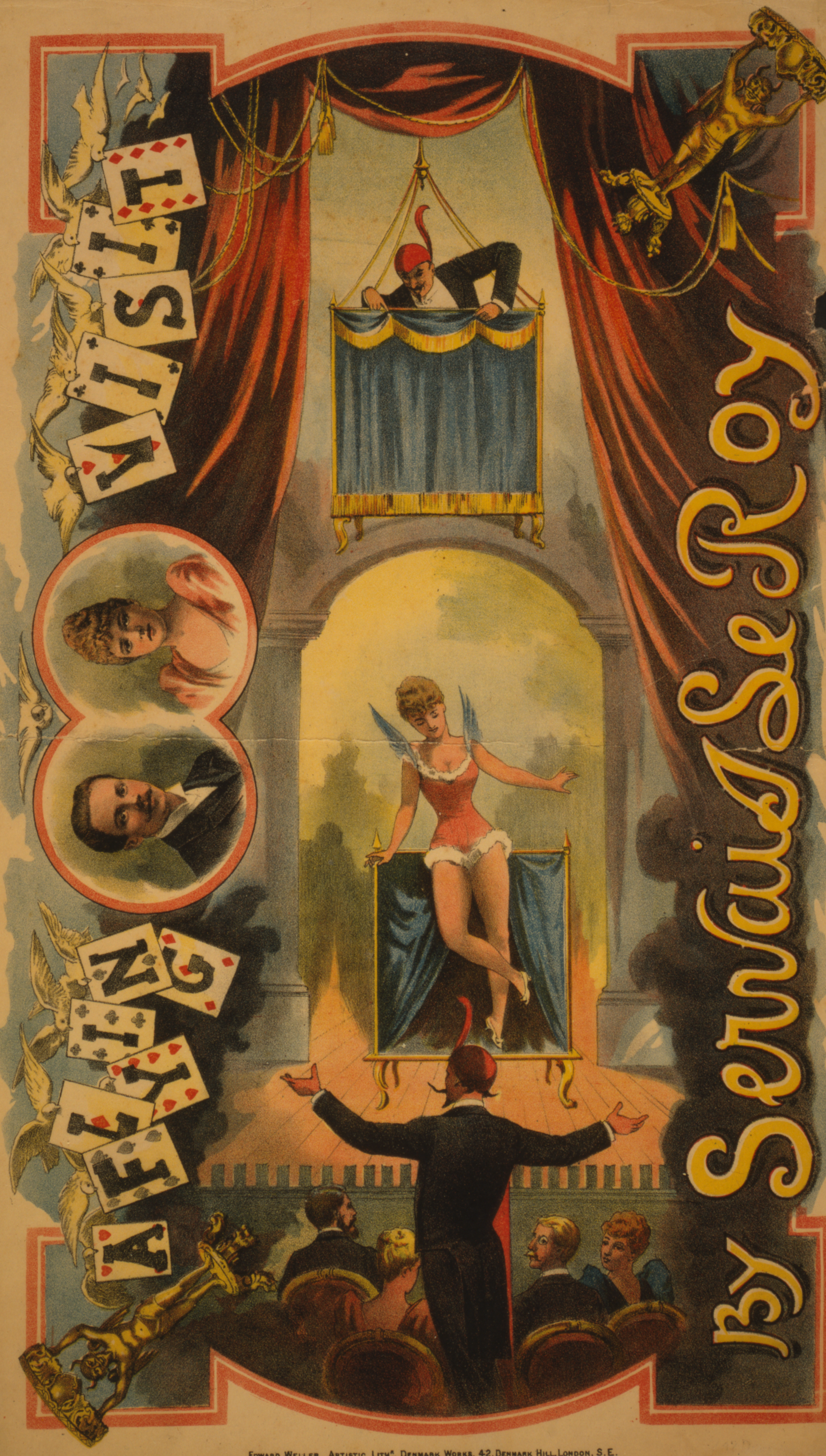
Poster for a magic show by Servais Le Roy (ca. 1890)

Servais Le Roy (4 May 1865 – 2 June 1953) was a Belgian magician, illusion designer, and businessman. He is known for the act Le Roy, Talma and Bosco and as the inventor of the classic levitation illusion Asrah the Floating Princess.

Le Roy was born in Spa, Belgium. He began his career in Belgium but later moved to London, where he established a supply house for illusions and scenery. At one time he performed with German-born illusionist Imro Fox and Frederick Eugene Powell as The Triple Alliance. However he is best known as a performer for the long-running act he developed with his wife Talma and Leon Bosco. Working as "Le Roy - Talma - Bosco" they were sometimes also billed as The Comedians de Mephisto Co.

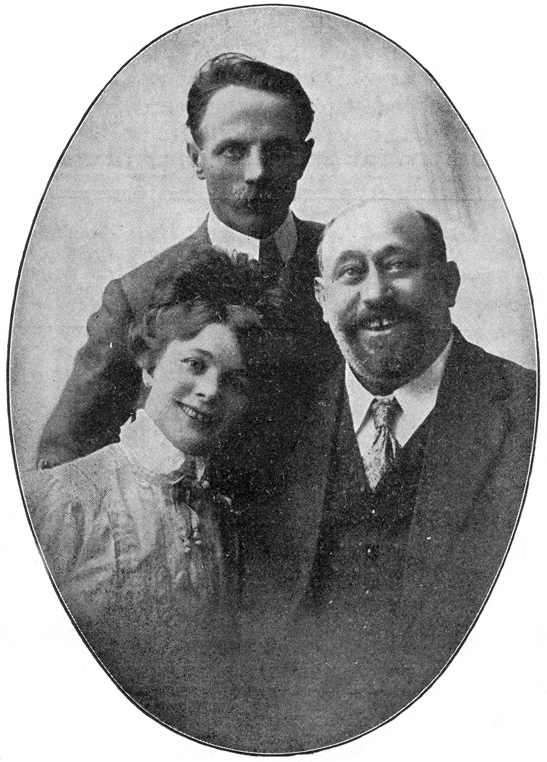
Le Roy, Talma, Bosco, April 1912

Talma (whose real name was Mary Ford), specialised in sleight of hand and was known as a brilliant manipulator of coins. Bosco, who was a rotund man, played a buffoon character. Although the act was very much a partnership to which all three contributed as magicians, Servais Le Roy sometimes received additional headline billing. According to William Rauscher's biography, Monarch of Mystery, Bosco was played by no less than nine different performers over the years.

Servais Le Roy and Talma first performed the Asrah levitation in London in 1914. In this trick, Talma would lie on a couch and Servais would cover her with a sheet. He would then appear to make her rise into the air, pass a large hoop over her floating body, and finally pull away the sheet to reveal that she had vanished. Le Roy is also credited with developing other respected tricks and illusions, including Where do the ducks go?, Modern Cabinet, the Palanquin and the Costume Trunk. He is too the first illusionist magician to take an interest in the piano as a magic object.

Le Roy later put his own show into storage and accepted a contract from Horace Goldin to front one of several companies that were touring with Goldin's show, featuring the then sensational Sawing a woman in half illusion.

Le Roy fumbled through his final performance and subsequently destroyed all his equipment. He died in 1953 in Keansburg, New Jersey, USA.
