= Troya =

Troya may refer to:

- Troya (Asia Minor), the Turkish and Spanish translation for the city of Troy
- Carlo Troya (1784–1858), Italian historian and politician
- C.D. Troya, a Honduran football club

== See also ==
- Troja (disambiguation)
- Troy (disambiguation)
- Troyan (disambiguation)
