= Der lachende Mann =

1966 film

The Laughing Man – Confessions of a Murderer
- Der lachende Mann – Bekenntnisse eines Mörders
- Directed by: Walter Heynowski; Gerhard Scheumann
- Produced by: Robert Michel
- Cinematography: Horst Donth; Peter Hellmich
- Edited by: Traute Wischnewski
- Release date: 1966
- Country: East Germany
- Language: German

The Laughing Man – Confessions of a Murderer (German: Der lachende Mann – Bekenntnisse eines Mörders), commonly referred to as The Laughing Man is an East German film released in 1966. The film was directed by Walter Heynowski and Gerhard Scheumann.

== Production ==
During the creation of the film, Heynowski and Scheumann claimed to have encountered significant problems with the East German state film studio DEFA, influencing their later decision to seek autonomy from the studio. Director for newsreels and documentaries at DEFA Rolf Schnabel contested these claims. He stated that while Heynowski and Scheumann were developing a movie about the Congo Crisis titled Snapshots from the Congo (German: Schnappschüsse aus dem Kongo) based on material from the magazine Stern, he suggested the idea of talking with the magazine's sources. He also claimed that documentary crew were able to contact Siegfried Müller with studio help.

The documentary was shot in late 1965 in Munich, West Germany.

== Description ==
Posing as West German journalists, East German documentary filmmakers Heynowski and Scheumann pay a visit to the notorious Nazi-turned-mercenary Siegfried Müller and interview him about his life, including his participation in Congo's civil war.

== Reception ==
The Laughing Man was first broadcast on February 9, 1966, at 8 P.M on Deutscher Fernsehfunk. It would gain significant popularity in East Germany, and be regularly re-aired. It also was widely distributed in the international market, and by 1981 had been subtitled in English, French, and Spanish.

The Laughing Man was Heynowski and Scheumann's first major success, and their first collaboration. They would become major figures in East German media following the movie's release, gaining the support of Erich Honecker. A year after the movie's release, Heynowski and Scheumann were able to found an autonomous film studio under DEFA due to the film's success.
