= Albany railway station, Jamaica =

Albany
- Albany railway station, Saint Mary, Jamaica c1896

General information
- Coordinates: 18.291828°N 76.857176°W
- Owner: Jamaica Railway Corporation
- Line: Bog Walk to Port Antonio branch line
- Platforms: Single, double sided
- Tracks: Three (Through, passing loop, siding)

Construction
- Structure type: Wooden single story

History
- Opened: 1896
- Closed: 1978; since destroyed by fire
Location
- Location within Jamaica

Albany railway station opened in 1896, closed in 1975, reopened in 1977 and closed for good in 1978. It was on the Bog Walk to Port Antonio branch line, 42.5 miles (68.4 km) from the Kingston terminus, and served the surrounding agricultural community, providing a means for bananas to reach and be exported from Port Antonio. It was destroyed by fire sometime after closure.

== Architecture ==
The station was a single story wooden building with sash windows. The pitched roof was extended to form a canopy over the platform on all four sides of the building.

== Track layout ==
In addition to the platform serving the through line, there was a second platform on the opposite side of the station building to provide a passing loop. There was also a freight siding.

== Fares ==
In 1910 the third class fare from Albany to Kingston was 3/6 (three shillings and sixpence); first class was about double.

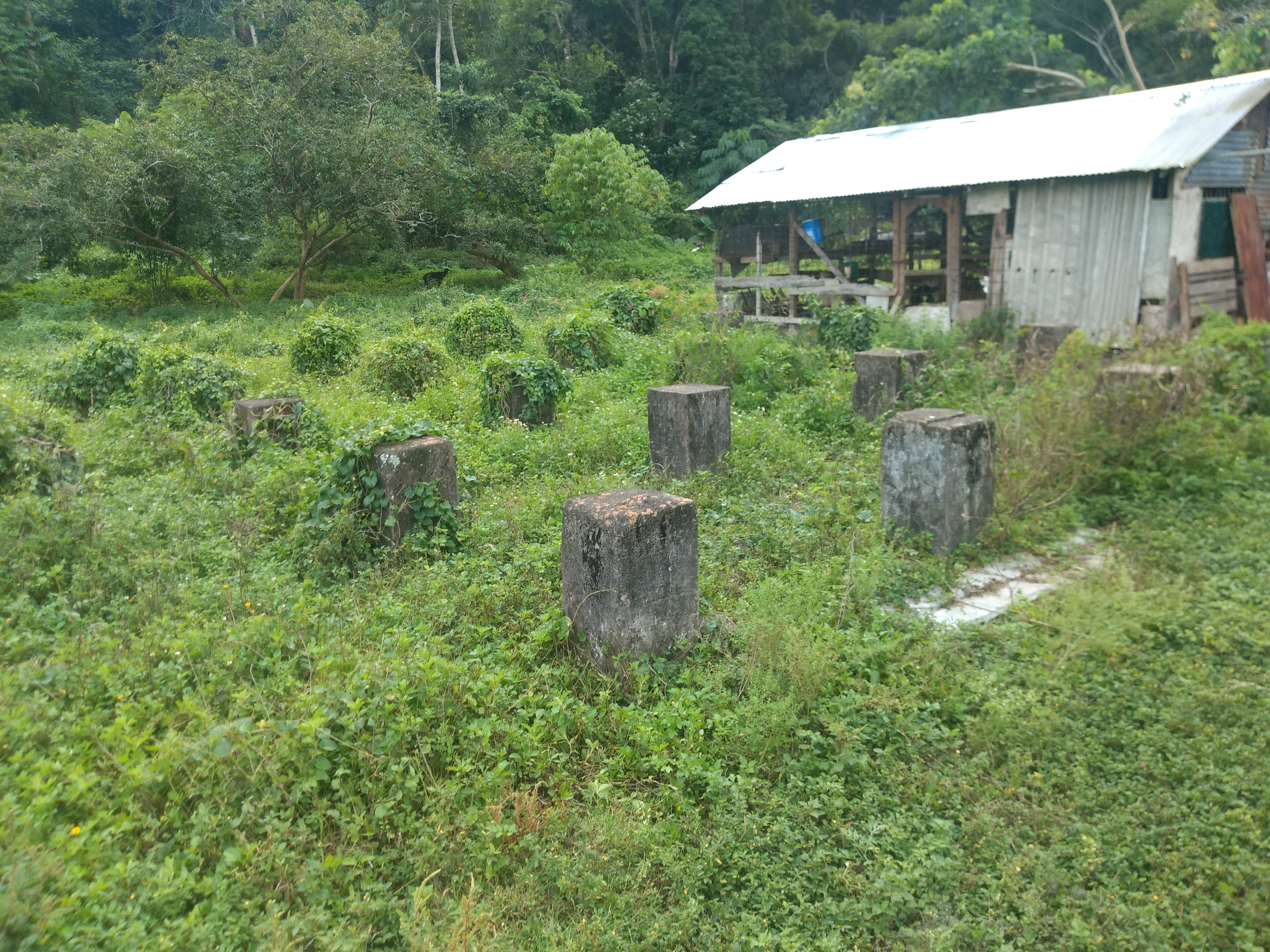
Remnants of the Albany Railway Station as seen December 2021

== See also ==
- Railways of Jamaica
- Railway stations in Jamaica

== Bibliography ==
- Satchell, Veront M & Sampson, Cezley (2003), The rise and fall of railways in Jamaica 1845-1975, The Journal of Transport History, archived from the original on November 2, 2007
