= Siegfried Müller (mercenary) =

German mercenary (1920–1983)

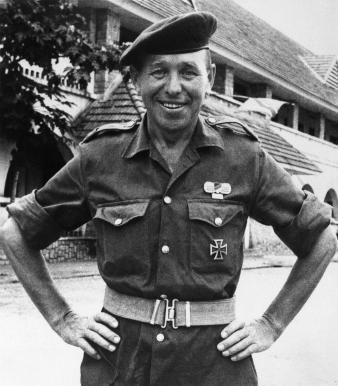
- Siegfried Müller during the Congo Crisis, wearing his Iron Cross
- Born: 26 October 1920; Crossen an der Oder, Germany
- Died: 17 April 1983 (aged 62); Johannesburg, South Africa
- Military career
- Allegiance: Nazi Germany; Republic of the Congo
- Branch: Wehrmacht; 5 Commando
- Rank: Oberleutnant (Germany); Major (Congo)
- Nickname: Kongo Müller
- Conflicts: World War II; Simba rebellion

Siegfried Friedrich Heinrich Müller (26 October 1920 – 17 April 1983), referred to as "Congo Müller" (Kongo-Müller), was a German-born soldier and mercenary. Müller was an officer-candidate in the Wehrmacht in World War II and, after emigrating to Apartheid South Africa, became a mercenary commanding part of 5 Commando in the Congo Crisis.

Given substantial media coverage by foreign journalists in the Congo, Müller achieved widespread notoriety in West and East Germany in the mid-1960s as a result of his activities in the Congo and overt nostalgia for the Nazi era.

== Early life and education ==
Siegfried Friedrich Heinrich Müller was born in Crossen an der Oder, Germany (modern Krosno Odrzańskie, Poland) in 1920 to a conservative Prussian family. His father was in World War I and later in the Wehrmacht as a lieutenant-colonel. Siegfried was enrolled at a boarding school in Freiburg and was in the Jungvolk, reaching the rank of Fähnleinführer. He then joined the Reich Labour Service, and the Wehrmacht in 1939. He first experienced action during the German invasion of Poland although he says he saw very little combat. He says that, after the invasion, he would sometimes dress as a Polish peasant and walk along the lines of Soviet-occupied Poland in order to reconnoiter. He fought in the German invasion of the Soviet Union in 1941 and spent the rest of the war on the Eastern Front. He said that he was promoted to the rank of first lieutenant on 20 April 1945, Hitler's birthday. After being seriously wounded from a bullet hitting his spine, he was evacuated from East Prussia to Frankfurt, where he was captured by the Americans.

== Career ==
Released in 1947, he enlisted in the US Army's Civilian Labor Group (CLG), an American Labor Service Unit of Germans; he then became a lieutenant in a CLG security unit. He also worked as an Industrial Police watchman and trained NATO troops in Paris. He was denied entry to the Bundeswehr in 1956, but found employment with British Petroleum, clearing mines planted by the Afrika Korps in the Sahara Desert during World War II.

=== Congo Crisis ===
Müller emigrated to South Africa in 1962 and was recruited as a mercenary with the rank of lieutenant in 5 Commando in 1964 as part of the repression of the Simba rebellion in the Congo Crisis. At 44, Müller was the oldest of Mike Hoare's soldiers. He was promoted to captain after a successful operation to seize Albertville (now Kalemie) and led 52 Commando, a small sub-unit of 5 Commando of approximately 53 soldiers, from July 1964. He was later promoted to major. In this period, the units participated in widespread arbitrary violence, killings, and other war crimes. There were reports that Müller and his mercenaries would decorate their vehicles with the skulls and bones of their enemies, as well as drunken violence, looting and mounting the heads of their enemies on spears. Pictures show Müller wearing his Iron Cross in the Congo, attracting attention from journalists from Time magazine.

In late 1964, Müller's unit suffered from low morale and desertion due to their first assault on the town of Boende being unsuccessful, with deserters criticizing Müller as "incompetent" and "too soft". The mercenaries eventually captured the city.

As news of atrocities committed by mercenaries in the Congo spread, Müller became a hate figure among socialists and student activists in West Germany. He was first brought to public attention by a feature entitled "Congo Atrocity" in the December 1964 issue of the left-leaning magazine Konkret. Media portrayed him as a war criminal, an SS veteran, and claimed that he would read his copy of Mein Kampf after every battle. Another lengthy interview included Müller speaking nostalgically of his wartime service in German-occupied Poland and France and "concluded with him laughing as he spoke about how he was now compelled to follow the 'barbaric customs' of the Congo by not taking wounded opponents prisoner but simply shooting them dead." The historian Quinn Slobodian states "Müller provided a link between Nazi Germany and postcolonial conflict beyond polemical analogy".

He was also profiled as a hate figure by state media in East Germany where some instead responded by seeing him as a symbol of the counterculture comparable with the Rolling Stones. He was interviewed for the 1966 East German documentary The Laughing Man – Confessions of a Murderer in which he was also the main subject.

== Later life and death ==
He died in the Boksburg, Gauteng suburb of Johannesburg, South Africa, of stomach cancer in April 1983.

== In popular culture ==
The character Captain Henlein from the 1968 film Dark of the Sun was based on Müller.
