= Hope Bay Mine =

Gold mine in Nunavut, Canada

Coordinates: 68°08′15″N 106°36′34″W

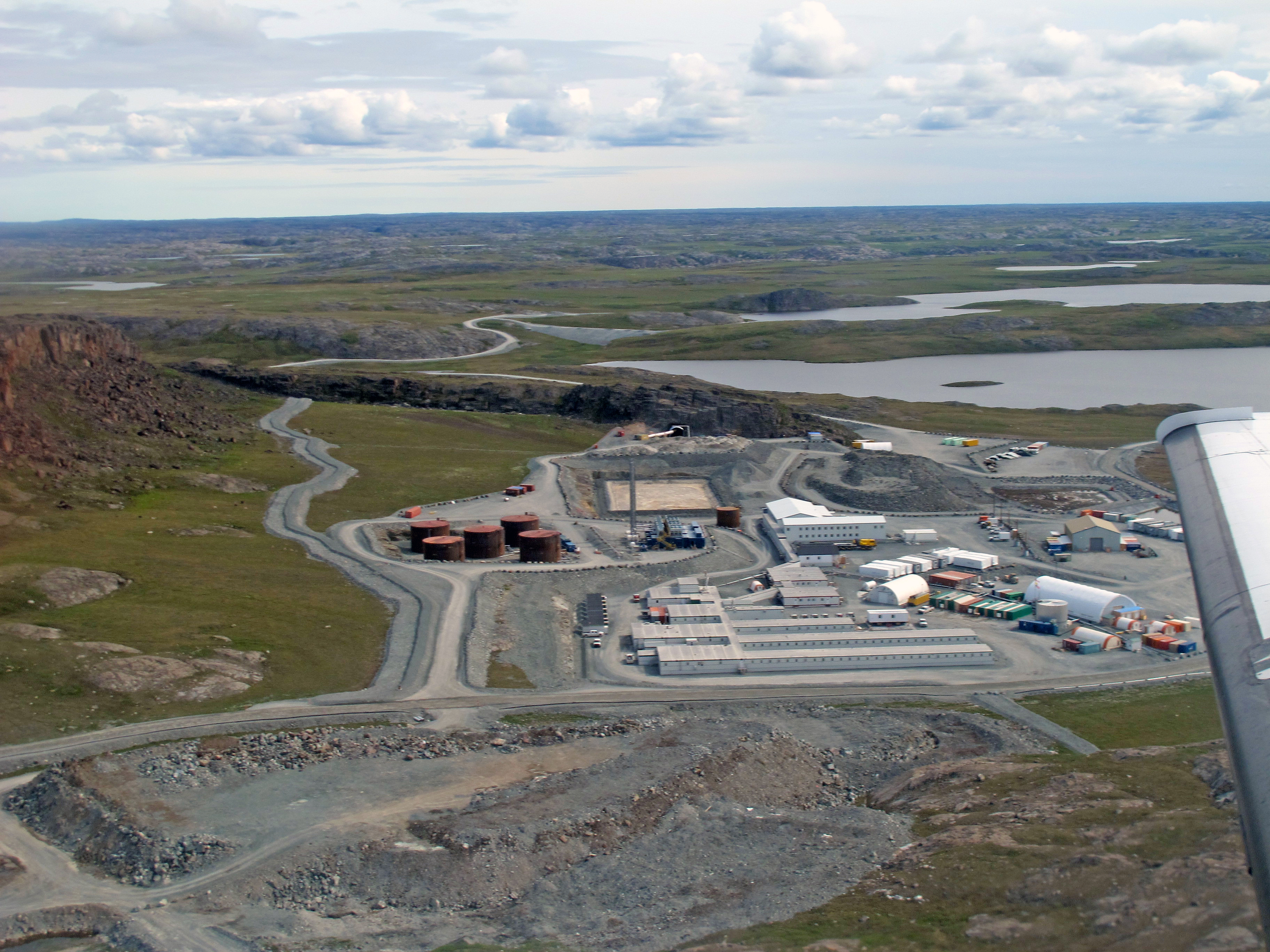
Hope Bay Mine, main camp

Hope Bay Mine is a gold mine in Hope Bay, Nunavut. It is near NORAD's Victoria Island site in Cambridge Bay.

== History ==
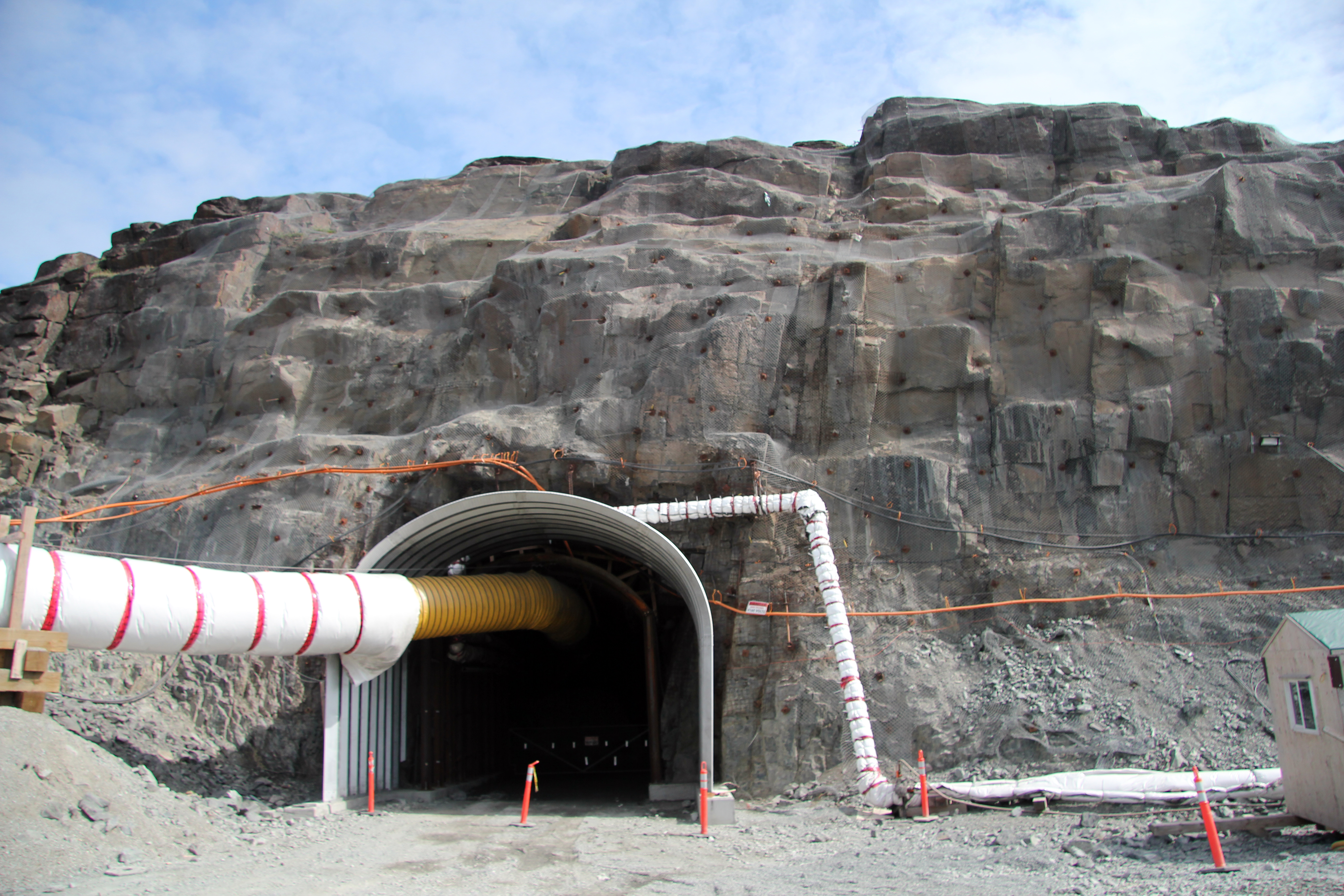
Hope Bay Mine shaft

Hope Bay has been explored by multiple companies since the early 1990s, including Newmont Mining. In 2012, Newmont Mining placed the Hope Bay Mine project on care and maintenance while seeking a buyer. In March 2013, TMAC Resources purchased Hope Bay. TMAC Resources began producing gold in early 2017 from its property here. In 2020, the TMAC Resources property was acquired for CAD$230 million by Shandong Gold Mining, a Chinese government-owned company. In December 2020 the Canadian government moved to block the acquisition and cited the Investment Canada Act, and national security concerns, although local Canadian pundits protested that there was no alternative.

Hope Bay Mine and associated elements was purchased on 2 February 2021 by Agnico Eagle. Agnico Eagle paused the production activities in 2022, in favour of increased exploration activities. Agnico Eagle CEO Sean Boyd said in June 2024 that the Hope Bay mining project was a nation-building exercise in Canada’s far north. On 4 July 2024 Agnico Eagle announced the purchase of the Oro project from North Arrow Minerals for $1.75 million. The Oro project borders on the Hope Bay Mine.
