= Imro Fox =

German-born American chef and Magician (1862–1910)

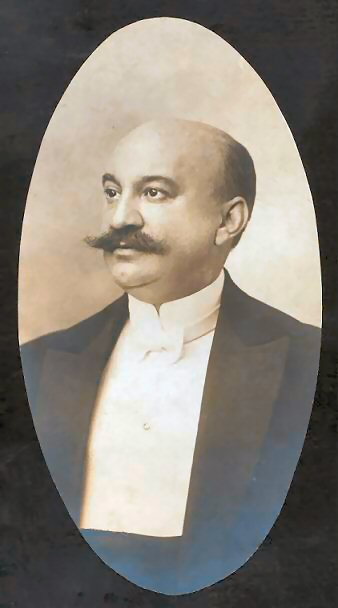
- NYPL Digital Gallery
- Born: Isidore Fuchs; May 21, 1862; Bromberg, Kingdom of Prussia (now Bydgoszcz, Poland)
- Died: March 4, 1910 (aged 47); Utica, New York, US
- Occupation: Magician
- Spouse: Pauline Abrams (1888-1910)

Imro Fox (May 21, 1862 – March 4, 1910) was a German-born American chef who became a headlining stage magician billed as the "comic conjuror". He was active between 1880 and 1910 and was known for the line, "Mahvelous! Everything I do is mahvelous."

== Early life and career ==
Isidore Fuchs was born in Bromberg, Kingdom of Prussia and immigrated to America seventeen years later aboard the steamship Suabia. Fuchs eventually settled in New York City where he became a citizen in 1888. He began working as a chef at hotels in New York City and later at a hotel in Washington D.C. popular with vaudeville players engaged at the nation's capital. It was at the latter that one day in 1880 he was approached by the head of a vaudeville company in need of a magician. Theirs was unfit to take to the stage and the hotel management had recommended Fuchs, then an amateur magician with no stage experience. The engagement proved satisfactory and within a short while Fuchs began performing as Imro Fox.

Fox became known as the "comic conjuror" with the unique talent of performing rapid-fire sleight of hand tricks as he peppered his audience with a string of fast-paced, often self-deprecating, one-liners such as: "Why is my head like heaven?—because there is no parting there."

In Some Magicians I Have Met, Henry Ridgely Evans described Fox's opening act as follows:

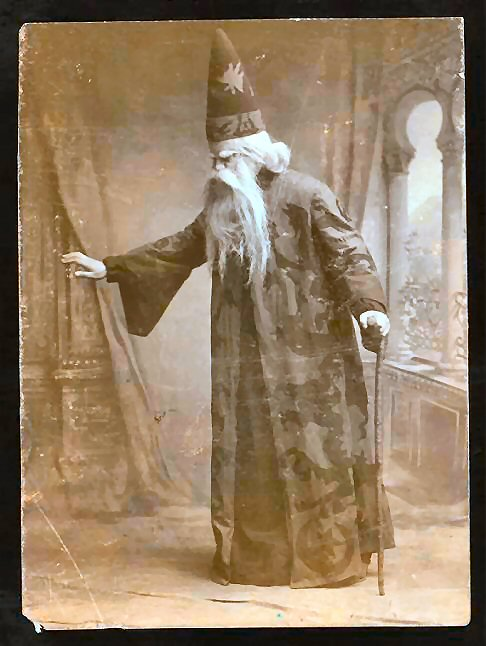
Fox as the Sorcerer - NYPL Digital Gallery

His entertainment is quite original. The curtain rises on a gloomy cavern. In the middle is a boiling caldron, fed by witches à la Macbeth. An aged necromancer, dressed in a long robe with a pointed cap on his head enters. He begins his incantations, whereupon hosts of demons appear, who dance about the caldron. Suddenly amid the crash of thunder and a blinding flash of light, the wizard's cave is metamorphosed into a twentieth century drawing room, fitted up for a conjuring séance. The decrepit sorcerer is changed into a gentleman in evening dress—Mr. Fox—who begins his up-to-date entertainment of modern magic. Is this not cleverly conceived?

By 1888 Fox was a member of Hyde's Big Specialty Company at such venues as Chicago's New Olympic Theatre and the following year a performer with Reilly and Woods on their West Coasts tour that included engagements at the Bush Street Theatre in San Francisco and the Los Angeles Theatre in LA. A high water mark in his career came in 1890 with a successful engagement at the Trocadero Palace in London. In 1896 Fox was a member of Frank Dumont's, The Rainmakers, a traveling variety show, and a year or so later joined fellow magicians Servais Le Roy and Frederick Powell in an act called The Great Triple Alliance, dubbed by the press as "the three crowned princes of the mystic world". Later Fox would tour North America with his own company of magicians and vaudeville acts. In 1896 Fox made at least three silent films for the American Mutoscope and Biograph Company, Imro Fox, Conjuror, Imro Fox Rabbit Trick and The Human Hen.

In December, 1908, Billboard Magazine wrote of Fox's first tour (in recent memory) of the American West:

Imro Fox, comic conjurer and "deceptionist," is in a class by himself. He turns the problems of legerdemain into a happy pastime and entertaining half-hour. His personality is perhaps the most striking part of bis performance, although his natural humor and the inimitable way in which he says, "marvelous," is irresistibly funny. Mr. Fox is a favorite in Europe, although he is an American, and this is his first tour in the West.

== Death ==
Fox died in the early morning hours of March 4, 1910, in the lobby of the Hotel Martin in Utica, New York. He had retired the evening before after giving a performance at the Keith-Proctor Theatre, but returned to the lobby a few hours later, partially dressed and asking for a doctor. He died before help could arrive. Fox was survived by Pauline Abrams, his wife for nearly twenty-two years and was interred at the Oheb Sholom Cemetery in New Jersey, where a little over a year later some one-hundred members of the United Magicians Association of America gathered to witness the unveiling of a granite monument built to commemorate his life.
