= Port Antonio =

Port Antonio Puot Antuoni
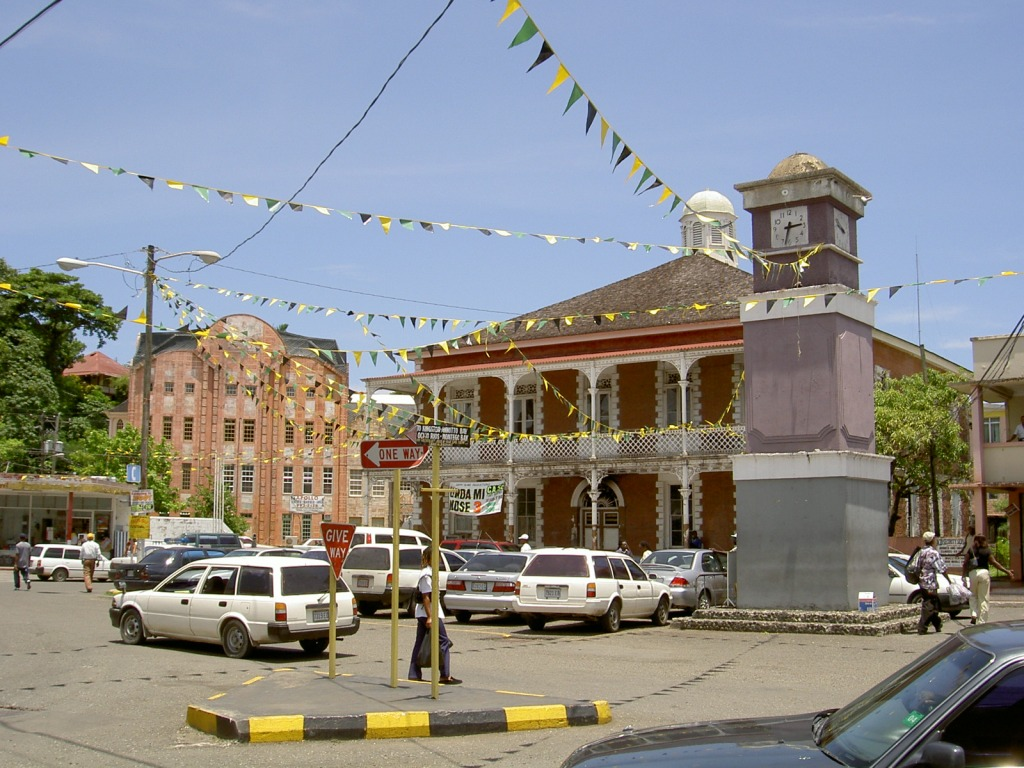
- Port Antonio's Clock Tower

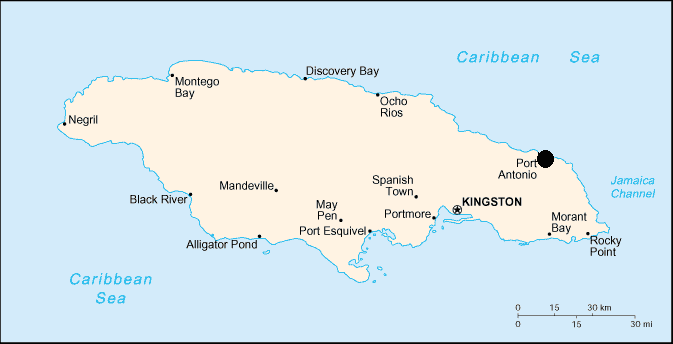
- Location of Port Antonio shown within Jamaica
- Coordinates: 18°10′N 76°27′W
- Country: Jamaica
- County: Surrey
- Parish: Portland

Population (1991 Census)
  - Total: 14,400+
  - Portland Parish: 81,000+
- Time zone: UTC-5 (EST)

Port Antonio (Jamaican Patois: Puot Antuoni) is the capital of the parish of Portland on the northeastern coast of Jamaica, about 100 km (60 miles) from Kingston. It had a population of 12,285 in 1982 and 13,246 in 1991. It is the island's third largest port, famous as a shipping point for bananas and coconuts, as well as one of its most important tourist attractions, tourism being a major contributor to the town's economy.

== History ==
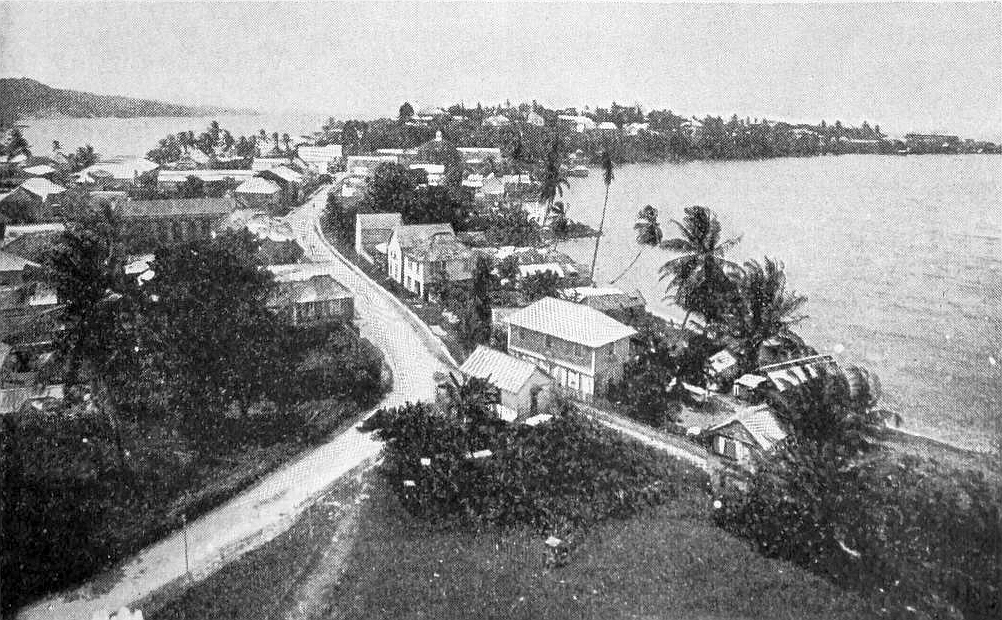
Port Antonio, c. 1903

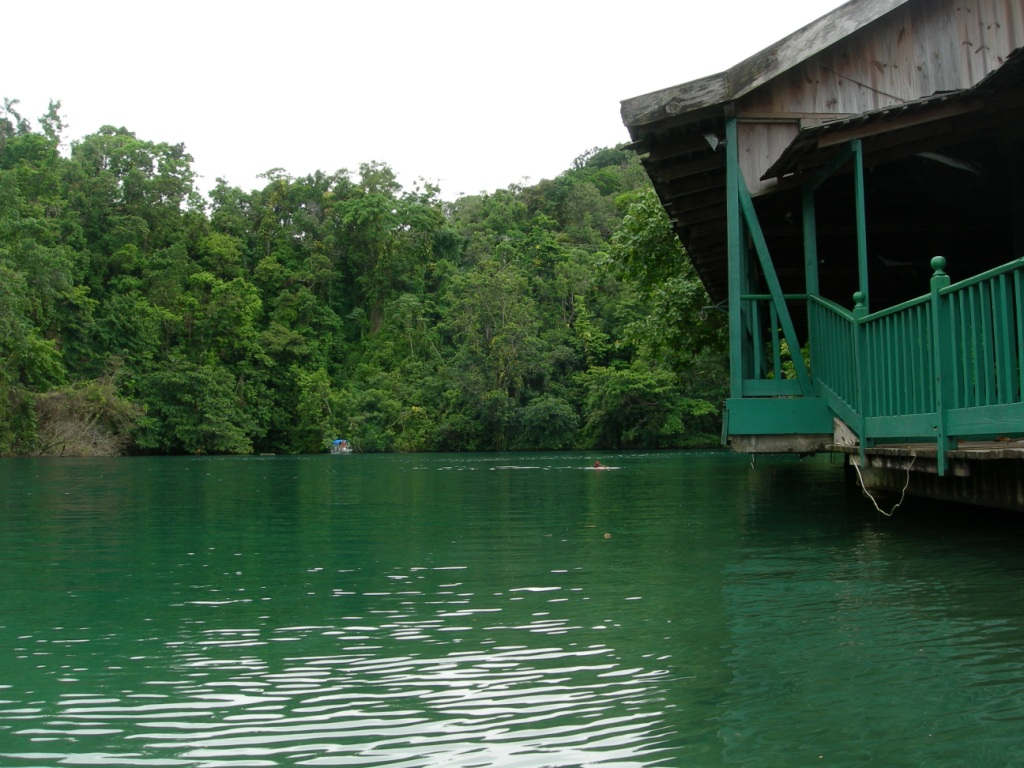
Blue Lagoon

Port Antonio was a settlement first established in Spanish Jamaica, when it was known as Puerto de San Antonio.

Portland formally became a parish in 1723 by order of the Duke of Portland, the then-Governor of Jamaica after whom it is named. The existing port was to be called Port Antonio and was slated to become a naval stronghold. To that end, by 1729, the colonial government began to build Fort George on the peninsula separating the twin East and West harbors known as the Titchfield promontory. The fort was intended to protect settlers from attacks by the Spanish from the sea, and from the Jamaican Maroons who lived in the mountains.

In the 1880s, Lorenzo Dow Baker started the banana trade in Jamaica and successfully promoted Port Antonio as a destination for wealthy American travelers. The banana trade and the tourists who came in the banana boats, was once so large that at one time, weekly sailing from Port Antonio was greater than weekly sailing from the English port of Liverpool.

The town featured in Hollywood films in the 1940s and 1950s, and in later movies such as Club Paradise and Cocktail. In 1946 actor, Errol Flynn arrived in the Port Antonio when his yacht, the Zaca washed ashore in bad weather. He subsequently bought nearby Navy Island, part of Fort George in Port Antonio as well as hundreds of acres of farmland along the Portland coast.

== Climate ==
Port Antonio features a trade-wind tropical rainforest climate under the Köppen climate classification. Like many areas with this climate type, average temperatures vary little throughout the course of the year, with average monthly temperatures roughly at 24 °C (75 °F) throughout the year. The town has a noticeably drier period from February through April, however it has no true dry season month as all 12 months on average easily exceeds 60 millimetres (2.4 in) of precipitation. Port Antonio averages a copious 3,000 millimetres (120 in) of rainfall annually.

Climate data for Port Antonio
Month	Jan	Feb	Mar	Apr	May	Jun	Jul	Aug	Sep	Oct	Nov	Dec	Year
Mean daily maximum °C (°F)	28.1 (82.6)	27.6 (81.7)	28.6 (83.5)	29.3 (84.7)	29.5 (85.1)	30.7 (87.3)	30.7 (87.3)	30.7 (87.3)	30.5 (86.9)	29.8 (85.6)	29.2 (84.6)	28.5 (83.3)	29.4 (84.9)
Mean daily minimum °C (°F)	19.2 (66.6)	18.9 (66.0)	19.4 (66.9)	20.1 (68.2)	21.1 (70.0)	21.6 (70.9)	21.8 (71.2)	21.8 (71.2)	21.8 (71.2)	21.7 (71.1)	20.8 (69.4)	20.6 (69.1)	20.7 (69.3)
Average precipitation mm (inches)	224 (8.8)	144 (5.7)	113 (4.4)	170 (6.7)	299 (11.8)	339 (13.3)	257 (10.1)	250 (9.8)	277 (10.9)	352 (13.9)	359 (14.1)	298 (11.7)	3,082 (121.2)
Average relative humidity (%)	78	77	77	77	76	78	75	75	77	80	81	81	78
Mean monthly sunshine hours	189.1	178.0	210.8	222.0	223.2	210.0	235.6	235.6	216.0	213.9	195.0	189.1	2,518.3
Mean daily sunshine hours	6.1	6.3	6.8	7.4	7.2	7.0	7.6	7.6	7.2	6.9	6.5	6.1	6.9
Source: Meteorological Service (Jamaica)

== Tourist destinations ==
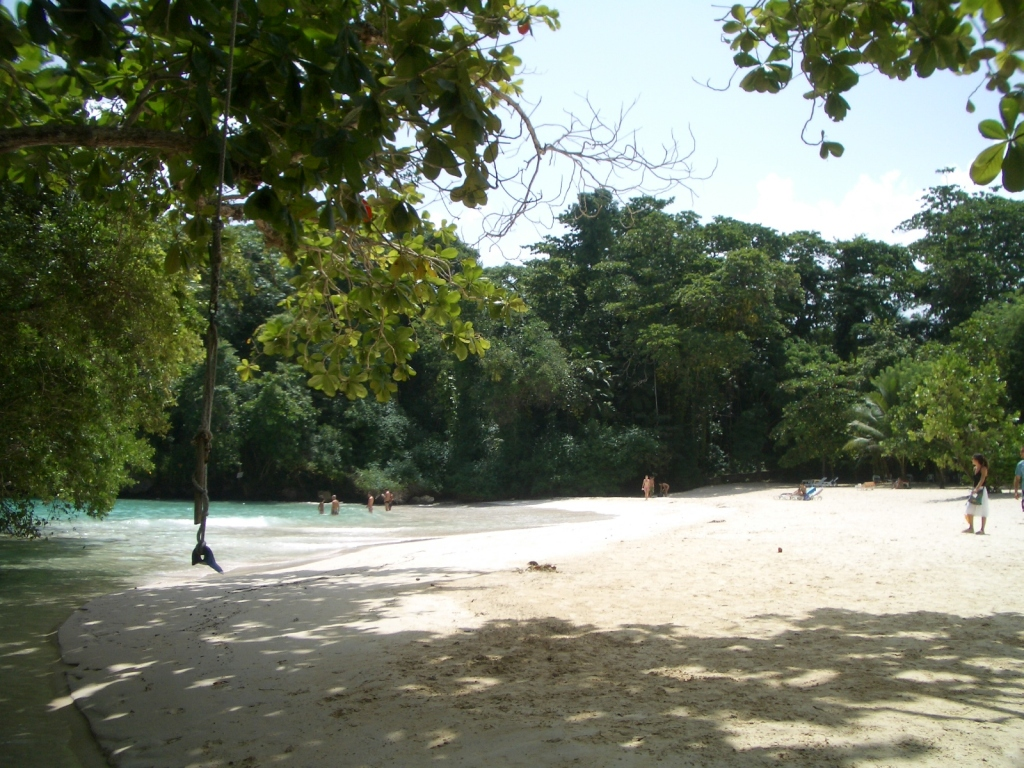
Frenchman's Cove

A popular sight in this area is the Blue Lagoon, Jamaica, which owes its colour to its depth of 60 m (200 feet). Other sights include the secluded Frenchman's Cove Beach, the ruins of Folly Mansion and the DeMontevin Lodge. In there also is the Bay View Eco Resort located on a former coconut plantation and Pimento Lodge in Long Bay among others.

== Transport ==
=== Bus ===
Port Antonio is a hub for bus transport in the north-eastern part of the island.

=== Rail ===
Port Antonio was the terminus of the railway from Kingston via Spanish Town and Bog Walk, which was primarily built to serve the banana export trade.

=== Air ===
The city is served by the Ken Jones Aerodrome.

== In popular culture ==
"Day-O (The Banana Boat Song)", best known from Harry Belafonte's 1956 hit record, was originally set at Boundbrook Wharf in Port Antonio, still the loading point for shipping bananas to Europe and the United States.

The 1963 drama film Lord of the Flies and the 1990 remake of the same name were both filmed at Frenchman's Cove.

The 1986 comedy film Club Paradise was filmed on location mostly in and around Port Antonio as the fictitious island of St Nicholas. Local sites such as the town's courthouse, the tax office (which in the film served as the police station), Blue Lagoon, Frenchman's Cove, Winifred Beach, were used as the backdrop to the story.

The 1988 romantic comedy drama film Cocktail was partially shot in Port Antonio, also with scenes of Frenchman's Cove and Blue Lagoon.

The 1988 drama film Clara's Heart has scenes filmed in Port Antonio.

The 1989 thriller film The Mighty Quinn was filmed at various locations throughout Jamaica, with the principal outdoor scenes shot in Port Antonio.

The official music video for the 1995 hit single "Fu-Gee-La" by the hip-hop trio Fugees was filmed in and around Port Antonio. scenes include Folly Ruins and the town's Cenotaph Square.

The 2010 action comedy film Knight and Day has scenes filmed at Frenchman's Cove.

The 2021 spy film No Time to Die was partially filmed in and around Port Antonio.

In 2024, Artist J. Cole made a song named "Port Antonio", where he speaks about his decision to withdrawal from the Drake–Kendrick Lamar feud.
