= Hope Bay, Jamaica =

Settlement in Jamaica

Coordinates: 18.200°N 76.569°W

Location of Hope Bay in Jamaica

Hope Bay is a settlement in Jamaica. It had a population of 1,646 as of 2009.
