= History of Schleswig-Holstein =

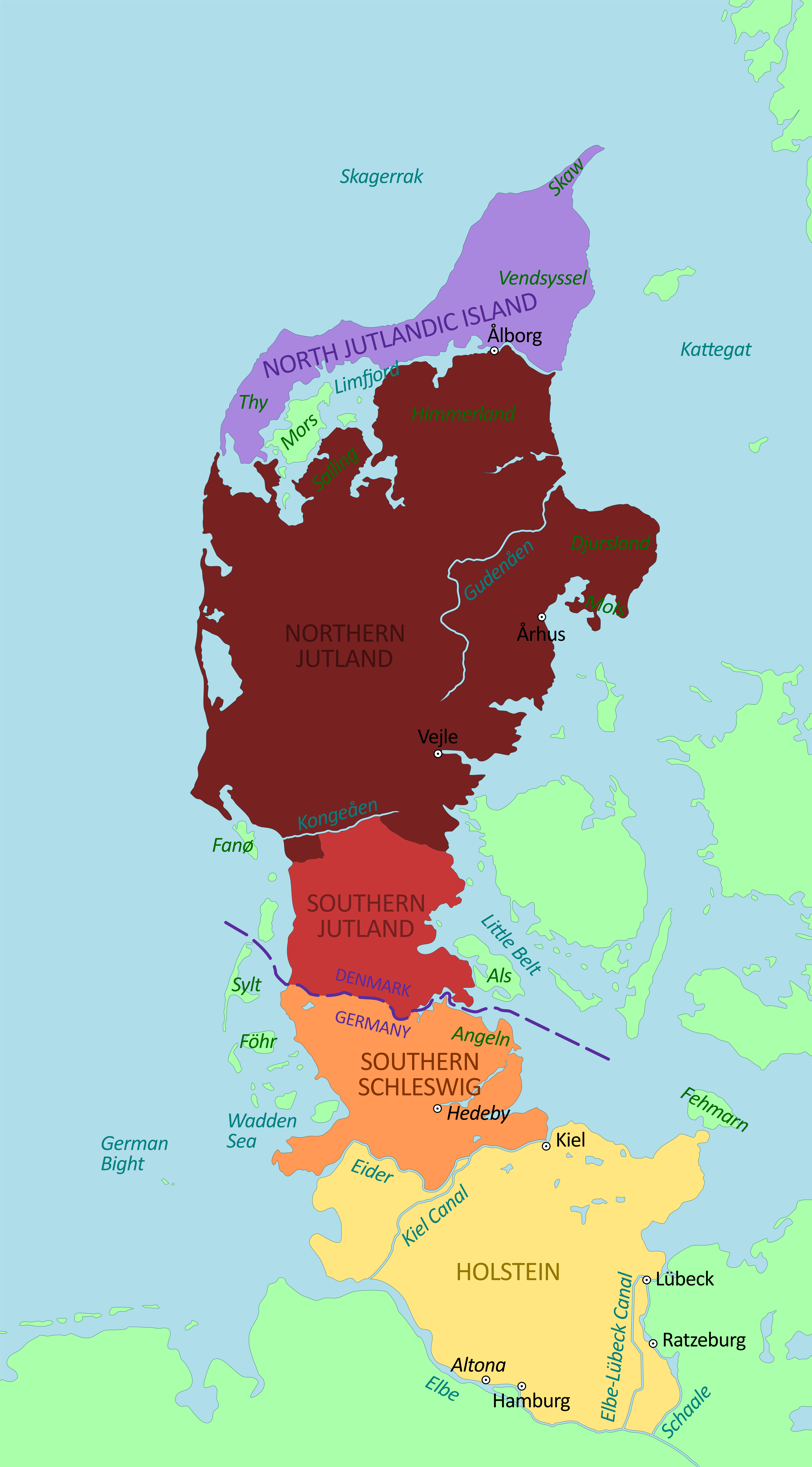
Map of the Jutland Peninsula North Jutlandic Island; commonly reckoned as part of Jutland, although technically an island, since it was severed from the Jutland Peninsula in 1825 by a flood Northern Jutland (Nørrejylland), i.e. Jutland north of the Kongeå River. In Danish, the region can be subdivided into Nord-, Midt-, and Sydjylland. Not to be confused with "Nordjylland", the latter roughly corresponds to the North Denmark Region Southern Jutland (Sønderjylland) or Northern Schleswig (Nordschleswig): Denmark (Middle Ages), part of the Duchy of Schleswig (a fief of the Danish crown) 13th century until 1864; German from 1864 until 1920; Danish since 1920 Southern Schleswig (German since 1864; part of the Duchy of Schleswig (a fief of the Danish crown) until 1864; historically an integral part of Southern Jutland) Historical area of Holstein (Holsten), sometimes considered part of Jutland Peninsula – south to the Elbe and the Elbe-Lübeck Canal

The history of Schleswig-Holstein consists of the corpus of facts since the pre-history times until the modern establishing of the Schleswig-Holstein state.

== Early history ==
The Jutland Peninsula is a peninsula in Northern Europe with modern-day Schleswig-Holstein at its base. Schleswig is also called Southern Jutland (Sønderjylland). The old Scandinavian sagas, perhaps dating back to the times of the Angles and Jutes give the impression that Jutland has been divided into a northern and a southern part with the border running along the Kongeå River.

Taking into account both archeological findings and Roman sources, however, one could conclude that the Jutes inhabited both the Kongeå region and the more northern part of the peninsula, while the native Angles lived approximately where the towns Haithabu and Schleswig later would emerge (originally centered in the southeast of Schleswig in Angeln), the Saxons (earlier known apparently as the Reudingi) originally centered in Western Holstein (known historically as "Northalbingia") and Slavic Wagrians, part of the Obodrites (Abodrites) in Eastern Holstein. The Danes settled in the early Viking ages in Northern and Central Schleswig and the Northern Frisians after approximately the year 900 in Western Schleswig.

The pattern of populated and unpopulated areas was relatively constant through Bronze Age and Iron Age.

== Prehistory ==
People have lived in the area of present-day Schleswig-Holstein since the Stone Age. During the Neolithic, the first farming and livestock-raising communities in the region lived in villages and constructed large stone burial monuments known as megalithic tombs.

By the Late Neolithic, approximately 2350–1700 BCE, metal objects, flint hoards and burials containing flint daggers appear in the archaeological record. Finds from this period show connections between Schleswig-Holstein and both Central Europe and southern Scandinavia, connections that continued into the Bronze Age.

By the Iron Age, the archaeological record includes settlements, cemeteries and sites devoted to iron production. At Borgstedt, archaeologists excavated a 1.3-hectare (3.2-acre) cemetery dating to the 5th century BCE containing 90 burials, most in urns. Several centuries later, from about 200 BCE to 200 CE, an iron-production site at Großenaspe operated using locally extracted bog iron ore. Archaeologists there uncovered 73 bloomery furnaces.

The region's peat bogs have also preserved human remains from the Iron Age. Bog bodies held by the Archaeological State Museum at Gottorf include Rendswühren Man, Damendorf Man, Osterby Man, Windeby I and Dätgen Man. Their preservation varies considerably. Some survived as substantially complete bodies, while others were preserved as heads or as compressed remains in which the bones had been largely demineralized by the peat.

== After the Dark Ages migrations ==
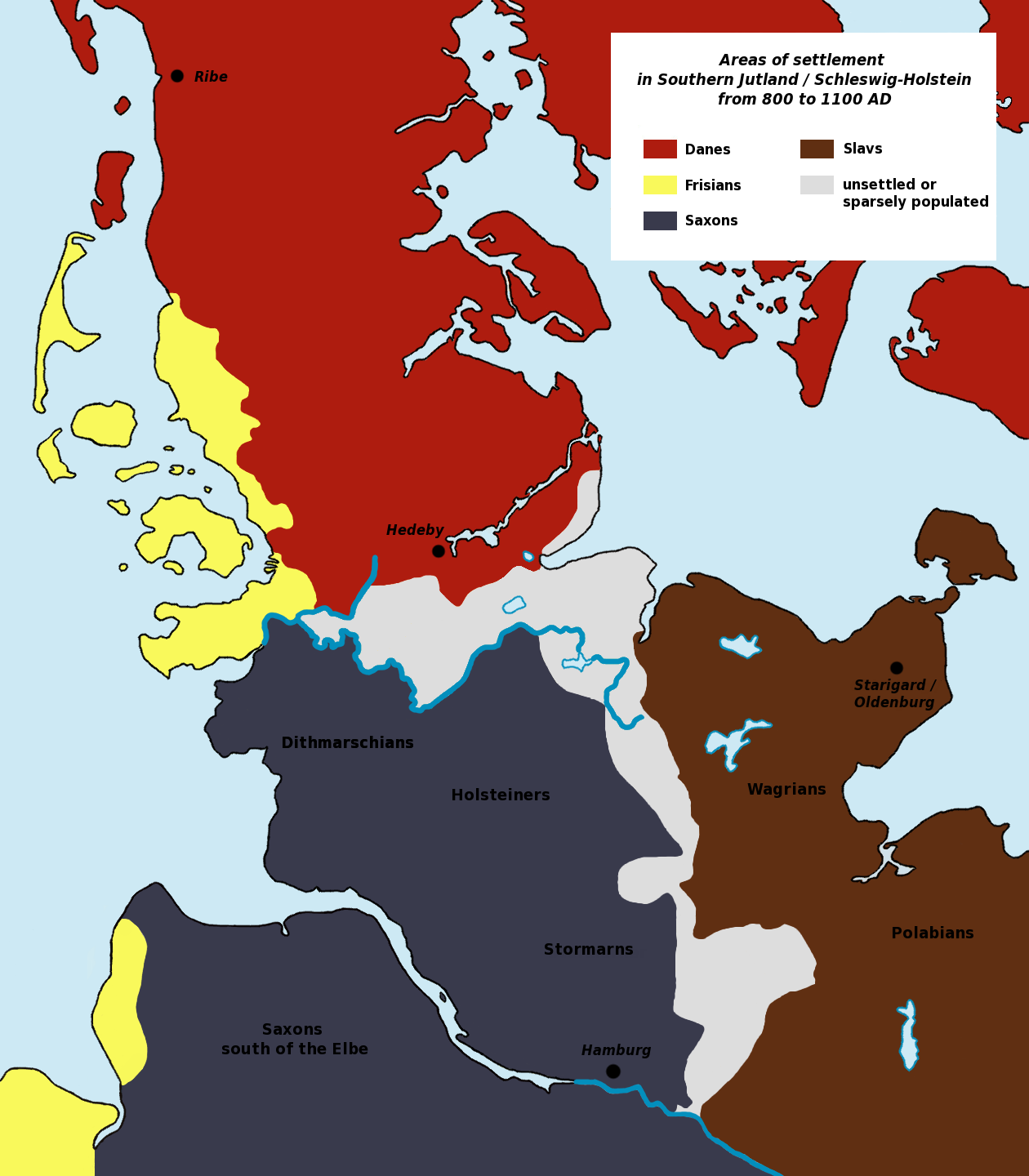
Historic settlement areas in present-day Schleswig-Holstein. Some areas were not permanently inhabited or became depopulated and repopulated during the Migration Period.

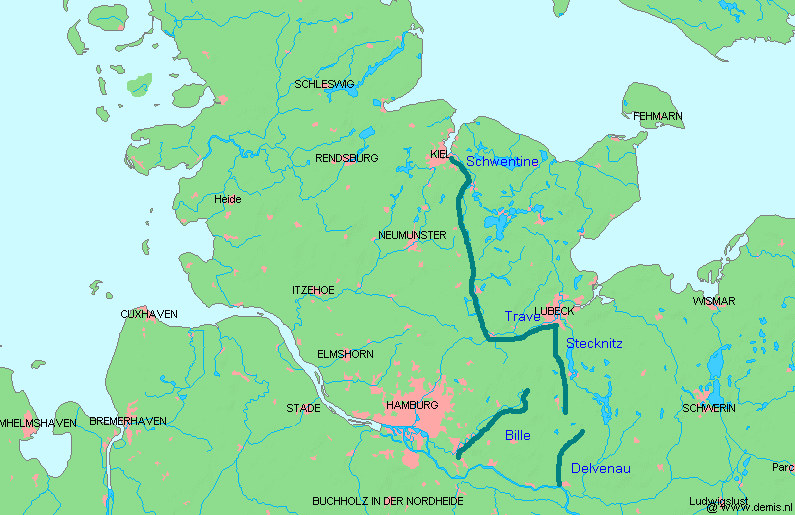
The Limes Saxoniae, the ancient border between the Saxons and the Obotrites, established c. 810.

After many Angles emigrated to the British Islands in the 5th century, the land of the Angles came in closer contact with the Danish islands – plausibly by partly immigration/occupation by the Danes. Later also the contacts increased between the Danes and the people on the northern half of the Jutish peninsula.

Judging by today's placenames, then the southern linguistic border of the Danish language seems to have been (starting at the west) up the Treene river, along the Danevirke (also known as Danewerk), then cutting across from the Schlei estuary to Eckernförde, and leaving the Schwansen peninsula, while the West coast of Schleswig had been the area of the Frisian language.

After the Slavic migrations, the eastern area of modern Holstein was inhabited by Slavic Wagrians (Vagri) a subgroup of the Obotrites (Obotritae).

== Nordalbingia and Wagria in 8th–9th centuries ==
Apart from northern Holstein and Schleswig inhabited by Danes there were Nordalbingia and Wagria in respectively, Western and Eastern Holstein.

Nordalbingia (German: Nordalbingien, i.e. land north of the Elbe river) was one of the four administrative regions of the medieval Duchy of Saxony, the others being Angria, Eastphalia, and Westphalia. Nordalbingia consisted of four districts: Dithmarschen, Holstein, Stormarn (north of the Elbe) and Hadeln (south of the Elbe).

The Wagri, Wagiri, or Wagrians were a tribe of Polabian Slavs inhabiting Wagria, or eastern Holstein in northern Germany, from the ninth to twelfth centuries. They were a constituent tribe of the Obodrite confederacy.

== Conquest of Nordalbingia by Obodrites and Franks ==
In the Battle of Bornhöved (798) (German: Schlacht bei Bornhöved) on the field of Sventanafeld (Sventanapolje, Slavonic for "sacred field") near the village of Bornhöved near Neumünster in 798 the Obodrites, led by Drożko, allied with the Franks, defeated the Nordalbingian Saxons.

Following the Nordalbingian defeat in the Battle of Bornhöved by combined forces of the Obodrites and the Franks, where the Saxons lost 4,000 people, 10,000 Saxon families were deported to other areas of the empire. Areas north of Elbe (Wagria) were given to the Obodrites, while Hadeln was directly incorporated. However, the Obodrites soon were invaded by Danes and only the intervention of Charlemagne pushed the Danes out of Eider river.

== Danes, Saxons, Franks struggle for control of Holstein ==
As Charlemagne extended his realm in the late 8th century, he met a united Danish army which successfully defended Danevirke, a fortified defensive barrier across the south of the territory west of the Schlei. A border was established at the Eider River in 811.

This strength was enabled by three factors:

- the fishing,
- the good soil giving good pasture and harvests
- in particular the tax and customs revenues from the market in Haithabu, where all trade between the Baltic Sea and Western Europe passed.

The Danevirke was built immediately south of the road where boats or goods had to be hauled for approximately 5 kilometers between a Baltic Sea bay and the small river Rheider Au (Danish, Rejde Å) connected to the North Sea. There on the narrowest part of southern Jutland was established the important transit market (Haithabu, also known as Hedeby, near modern Haddeby), which was protected by the Danevirke fortification. Hedeby was located on the inlet Schlei opposite to what is now the City of Schleswig.

The wealth of Schleswig, as reflected by impressive archeological finds on the site today, and the taxes from the Haithabu market, was enticing. A separate kingdom of Haithabu was established around year 900 by the Viking chieftain Olaf from Svealand. Olaf's son and successor Gnupa was however killed in battle against the Danish king, and his kingdom vanished.

The southern border was then adjusted back and forth a few times. For instance, the Holy Roman Emperor Otto II occupied the region between the river Eider and the inlet Schlei in the years 974–983, called the March of Schleswig, and stimulating German colonisation. Later Haithabu was burned by Swedes, and first under the reign of King Sweyn Forkbeard (Svend Tveskæg) (986–1014) the situation was stabilised, although raids against Haithabu would be repeated. Haithabu was once again and ultimately destroyed by fire in 1066. As Adam of Bremen reported in 1076, the Eider River was the border between Denmark and the Saxon territories.

From the time Danes came to Schleswig from today's eastern part of Denmark and Germans colonised Schleswig migrating from Holstein, the country north of the Elbe had been the battleground of Danes and Germans, as well as certain Slavic people. Danish scholars point to the existence of Danish placenames north for Eider and Danevirke as evidence that at least the most of Schleswig was at one time Danish; German scholars claim it, on the other hand, as essentially "Germanic", due to the fact that Schleswig became an autonomous entity and a duchy (in the 13th century) since it has been populated and been dominated from the South. The Duchy of Schleswig, or Southern Jutland (Sønderjylland), had been a Danish fief, though having been more or less independent from the Kingdom of Denmark during the centuries, similarly to Holstein, that had been from the first a fief of the Holy Roman Empire, originating in the small area of Nordalbingia, in present-day western Holstein, inhabited then mostly by Saxons but, in the 13th century, expanded to present-day Holstein.

Throughout the Middle Ages, Schleswig was a source of rivalry between Denmark and the nobility of the duchy of Holstein within the Holy Roman Empire. The Danish position can be exemplified with an inscription on a stone in the walls of the town of Rendsburg (Danish: Rendsborg) located on the border between Schleswig and Holstein: Eidora Romani Terminus Imperii ("The River Eider is the Border of the Holy Roman Empire"). A number of Holsatian nobles sought to challenge this.

== Danes, Saxons, Angles struggle for control of Schleswig ==
The area of Schleswig (Southern Jutland) was first inhabited by the mingled West Germanic tribes Cimbri, Angles and Jutes, later also by the North Germanic Danes and West Germanic Frisians. Holstein was inhabited mainly by the West Germanic Saxons, aside Wends (such as Obotrites) and other Slavic peoples in the East. The Saxons were the last of their nation to submit to Charlemagne (804), who put their country under Frankish counts, the limits of the Empire being pushed in 810 as far as the Schlei in Schleswig. In 811 the river Eider was declared as borderline between the Frankish Empire and Denmark. Then began the secular struggle between the Danish kings and the rulers of the Holy Roman Empire, and in 934 the German king Henry I established the March of Schleswig (Limes Danarum) between the Eider and the Schlei as an outpost of the Empire against the Danes.

South of this raged the contest between the Empire and Slavs. The Slavs, conquered and Christianised, rose in revolt in 983, after the death of the emperor Otto II, and for a while reverted to paganism and independence. The Saxon dukes, however, continued to rule central Holstein, and when Lothair of Supplinburg became duke of Saxony (1106), on the extinction of the Billung line, he enfeoffed Lord Adolphus of Schauenburg with the County of Holstein, as a Saxon subfief, becoming Adolphus I, Count of Holstein with the Saxon, later Lower Saxon dukes as liege lords.

== 12th century ==
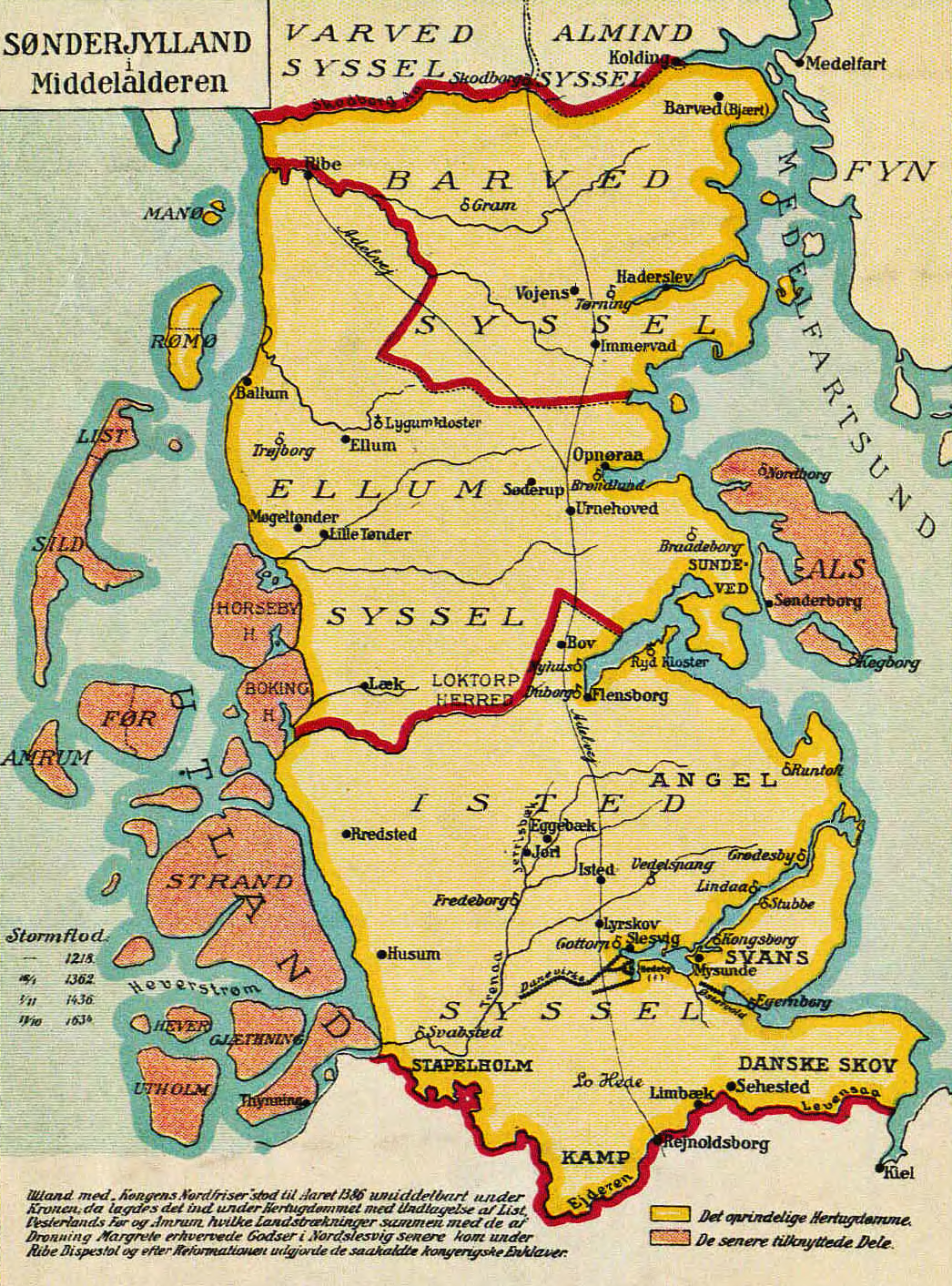
During the Nordic Middle Ages, the mainland part of Schleswig was divided into three sýslur, viz. Barvidsyssel, Ellumsyssel and Istedsyssel. The North Frisian Islands were known as Utlande.

The Earl (jarl) Knud Lavard (known in English as Canute Lavard), son of a Danish king, became Duke of Jutland or Southern Jutland. His son ascended the Danish throne, and the main branch continued as Kings, and a cadet branch descended from Abel of Denmark received Southern Jutland (Slesvig) as their appanage. During the rule of the dynasty Southern Jutland functioned as the Duchy which provided for the expenses of Royal Princes. Rivalry of royal succession and particularly the tendency of autonomy led to long-lasting feuds between the Dukes of Schleswig and the Kings of Denmark 1253–1325.

At that time, the Holy Roman Empire expanded northwards and had set up the Schauenburg family as counts of Holstein, under German suzerainty, first located in Nordalbingia, the Saxon part of the region, in what now is western Holstein. Knud Lavard had also gained awhile parts of Holstein, and thereby came in conflict with Count Adolphus I (Schauenburg) in the part of Holstein within the Empire, as they both were very keen on expanding their influence and pacifying the Wagrian tribe (see: Wends). Count Adolphus II, son of Adolphus I, succeeded and established the County of Holstein (1143) with about the borders it has had since then. Holstein was Christianised, many of the Wagrians were killed and the land was inhabited by settlers from Westphalia, Friesland and Holland. Soon the Holsatian towns, such as Lübeck and Hamburg, became serious trade competitors on the Baltic Sea.

== 13th century ==
Adolphus II (1128–1164), succeeded in re-conquering the Slavonic Wagri and founded the city and see of Lübeck to hold them in check. Adolphus III (d. 1225), his successor, received Dithmarschen in fee from the emperor Frederick I, but in 1203 the fortunes of war compelled him to surrender Holstein to Valdemar II of Denmark who mandated Albert of Orlamünde, the cession being confirmed in a Golden bull by the emperor Frederick II in 1214 and the pope in 1217, thus provoking the nobles in Holstein. Valdemar appointed his lieutenant in Holstein.

In 1223, King Valdemar and his eldest son were abducted by count Henry I, Count of Schwerin (also known as Heinrich der Schwarze), and held captive in Castle Dannenberg for several years. Count Henry demanded that Valdemar should surrender the land conquered in Holstein 20 years ago and become a vassal of the Holy Roman Emperor who in fact tried to intervene and arrange the release of Valdemar. Danish envoys refused these terms and Denmark declared war. The war ended in defeat of the troops under the command of Albert of Orlamünde at Mölln in 1225, and Valdemar was forced to surrender his conquests as the price of his own release and take an oath not to seek revenge. Valdemar was released from captivity in 1226 and appealed to Pope Honorius III to have his oath repealed, a request the Pope granted. In 1226, Valdemar attacked the nobles of Holstein, and initially, had success.

On July 22, 1227, the two armies clashed at Bornhöved in Holstein in the second Battle of Bornhöved. The battle ended in a decisive victory for Adolphus IV of Holstein. During the battle the troops from Dithmarschen abandoned the Danish army and joined Adolphus' army. In the following peace, Valdemar II relinquished his conquests in Holstein for good and Holstein was permanently secured to the house of Schauenburg.

King Valdemar II, who had retained the former imperial March north of the Eider, in 1232 erected Schleswig as a duchy for his second son, Abel. Holstein on the other hand, after the death of Adolphus IV in 1261, was split up into several countships by his sons and again by his grandsons (1290): the lines of Holstein-Kiel (1261–1390), Holstein-Pinneberg and Schaumburg (1290–1640) south of the Elbe, Holstein-Plön (1290–1350), Holstein-Rendsburg (1290–1459), and at times also Holstein-Itzehoe (1261–1290) and Holstein-Segeberg (1273–1315), and again (1397–1403), all named after the comital residential cities.

== 14th century ==
The connection between Schleswig and Holstein became closer during the 14th century as the ruling class and accompanying colonists intensely populated the Duchy Schleswig. Local lords of Schleswig had already early paid attention to keep Schleswig independent from the Kingdom of Denmark and to strengthen ties to Holstein within the Holy Roman Empire. This tradition of autonomy showed itself in future politics for centuries to come.

The rivalry, sometimes leading into war between the kings of Denmark and the Abelian dukes of Schleswig was expensive, and Denmark had to finance it through extensive loans. The Dukes of Schleswig were allied with the Counts of Holstein, who happened to become the main creditors of the Danish Crown, too, in the reign of the utterly incompetent king Christopher II of Denmark.

On the death of King Valdemar's descendant Eric VI of Denmark in 1319, Christopher II of Denmark attempted to seize the Duchy of Schleswig, the heir of which Duke Valdemar V (as of 1325) was a minor; but Valdemar's guardian and uncle, Gerhard III, Count of Holstein-Rendsburg (1304–1340), surnamed the Great and a notable warrior, drove back the Danes and, Christopher having been expelled, succeeded in procuring the election of Duke Valdemar to the Danish throne (as Valdemar III as of 1326), while Gerhard himself obtained the Duchy of Schleswig. King Valdemar III was regarded as a usurper by most Danish nobles as he had been forced by the Schleswig-Holstein nobility to sign the Constitutio Valdemaria (June 7, 1326) promising that The Duchy of Schleswig and the Kingdom of Denmark must never be united under the same ruler. Schleswig was consequently granted to Count Gerhard, being the leader of one of the three lines of the Schauenburg dynasty. The constitution can be seen as a first precursor to the Treaty of Ribe and similarly laying down the principle of separation between the Duchy of Schleswig and the Kingdom of Denmark and indeed uniting Schleswig and Holstein for the first time, though in personal union.

In 1330, Christopher II was restored to his throne and Valdemar III of Denmark abdicated his untenable kingship and returned to his former position as Duke of Schleswig which he held as Valdemar V of Schleswig. As compensation, Gerhard was awarded the island of Funen as a fief instead. In 1331 war broke out between Gerhard and King Christopher II, ending in Danish defeat. The peace terms were extremely harsh. King Christopher was only left in effective control of the small island of Langeland and faced the impossible task of raising 100,000 silver marks to redeem his country. Denmark had effectively been dissolved and was left without a king between 1332 and 1340. Gerhard, however, was assassinated in 1340 by a Dane.

In 1340, King Valdemar IV of Denmark began his more than twenty-year-long quest to reclaim his kingdom. While succeeding in regaining control of Zealand, Funen, Jutland, and Scania he, however, failed to obtain control of Schleswig, and its ducal line managed to continue its virtual independence.

This was the time when almost all of Denmark came under the supremacy of the Counts of Holstein, who possessed different parts of Denmark as pawns for their credits. King Valdemar IV (Atterdag) started to regain the kingdom part by part, and married his rival's sister Helvig of Schleswig, the only daughter of Eric II, Duke of Schleswig. Duke Valdemar V of Slesvig's son, Henry, was in 1364 nominally entfeoffed with the Duchy, although he never reached to regain more than the northernmost parts as he couldn't raise the necessary funds to repay the loans. With him, the Abelian line became extinct. The true holder of the lands was the count of Holstein-Rendsburg, but Henry's feudal heirs were his first cousin Margaret of Denmark, queen of several Scandinavian realms, and Albert of Mecklenburg, son of Margaret's elder sister Ingeborg of Denmark.

In 1372, Valdemar Atterdag turned his attention to Schleswig and conquered Gram in 1372 and Flensburg in 1373. Southern parts of Schleswig had been mortgaged to several German nobles by Duke Henry I, Duke of Schleswig (d. 1375, a son of the former king Valdemar III of Denmark), the last duke of that line. The childless, elderly Henry transferred his rights to his kinsman and brother-in-law King Valdemar IV in 1373. The ethnically German nobles, however, refused to allow the king to repay the mortgage and redeem the area in question.

In 1374, Valdemar bought large tracts of land in the province and was on the verge of starting a campaign to conquer the rest when he died on October 24, 1374, and shortly hereon Duke Henry I died in 1375. It was then when the male lines both in the kingdom and the duchy became extinct, that the counts of Holstein-Rendsburg seized on Schleswig, assuming at the same time the style of lords of Jutland. The nobles quickly took action and managed to regain more control of the Duchy which they emphasised to be independent of the Danish Crown.

In 1386, Queen Margaret I of Denmark, younger daughter of Valdemar IV of Denmark and Helvig of Schleswig, granted Schleswig as a hereditary fief under the Danish crown to Count Gerhard VI of Holstein-Rendsburg, grandson of Gerhard III, provided that he swore allegiance to her son King Oluf, although Schleswig actually still was held autonomously by the Count of Holstein-Rendsburg. Gerhard – after the extinction of the lines of Holstein-Plön (1350) and Holstein-Kiel (1390) – finally obtained also Holstein-Segeberg in 1403, ruling thus all of Holstein except of Holstein-Pinneberg with the small Schauenburg territories in Lower Saxony. With this merging of power begins the history of the union of Schleswig and Holstein.

== 15th century ==
Gerhard VI died in 1404, and soon afterwards war broke out between his sons and Eric of Pomerania, Margaret's successor on the throne of Denmark, who claimed South Jutland as an integral part of the Danish monarchy, a claim formally recognised by the Emperor Sigismund in 1424, it was not until 1440 that the struggle ended with the investiture of Count Adolphus VIII, Gerhard VI's son, with the hereditary duchy of Schleswig by Christopher III of Denmark.

In 1409, King Eric VII of Denmark (Eric of Pomerania) forced the German nobles to surrender Flensburg to him. War broke out in 1410, and Eric conquered Als and Ærø. In 1411, the nobles retook Flensburg, but in 1412 both sides agreed to a count of Mecklenburg to settle the dispute (Danish history claims his name was Ulrich of Mecklenburg). He awarded the city to Denmark, and Margaret I of Denmark took possession of the city. In Flensburg she was struck by the plague and died shortly after. A new mediation attempt was undertaken in 1416 by the Hanseatic League. Both sides accepted, and Denmark pledged the city of Schleswig as security, and the Holsteiners the stronghold of Tönning. The mediation was unsuccessful. In 1421, the Holsteiners succeeded in regaining Haderslev, Schleswig and Tønder.

In 1422, Duke Henry X of Silesia-Sagan (also known as duke Heinrich Rumpold), envoy of the Holy Roman Emperor, was recognised by both sides as arbitrator. He died, however, on January 18, 1423, before reaching a settlement. His master, Emperor Sigismund now wished to settle the issue, a decision strongly opposed by the nobles of Holstein. In 1424, Emperor Sigismund ruled, based on the fact that the people of Schleswig spoke Danish, followed Danish customs and considered themselves to be Danes, that the territory rightfully belonged to the King of Denmark. Henry IV, Count of Holstein-Rendsburg, protested and refused to follow the verdict.

In 1425, war broke out again. In 1431, a group of pro-German burghers opened the gates of Flensburg and an army of German nobles marched in. In 1432 peace was settled, and Eric recognised the conquests made by the German nobles. In 1439, the new Danish king Christopher III (also known as Christopher of Bavaria) bought the loyalty of count Adolphus VIII of Holstein-Rendsburg by granting him the entire Duchy of Schleswig as a hereditary fief but under the Danish crown. On the death of Christopher eight years later, Adolphus' influence secured the election of his nephew Count Christian VII of Oldenburg to the vacant Danish throne.

In 1448 Adolphus, as Adolphus I Duke of Slesvig and as Adolphus VIII Count of Holstein-Rendsburg, who himself was one of the closest heirs to Scandinavian monarchies, was influential enough to get his nephew Count Christiern (Christian VII) of Oldenburg elected King of Denmark.

When the Adolphus had died in 1459 without issue the Schauenburg dynasty in Holstein-Rendsburg had thus became extinct. The Schauenburg counts of Holstein-Pinneberg had no claim to succession in Schleswig; their election in Holstein-Rendsburg would have separated Schleswig and Holstein-Rendsburg. The separation of Schleswig and Holstein would have meant economic ruin for many nobles of Holstein. Moreover, the Holsatian nobles, mostly of German ethnicity, failed to agree on which course to take.

Therefore, it was easy for King Christian I of Denmark (son of Hedwig, the sister of the late duke-count Adolphus) to secure his election both as duke of Schleswig and count of Holstein-Rendsburg. In 1460, King Christian called the nobility to Ribe, and on March 2, 1460, the nobles agreed to elect him as successor of Count Adolphus VIII as the new count of Holstein-Rendsburg, in order to prevent the separation of the two provinces. King Christian I, though he had been forced to swear to the Constitutio Valdemariana, succeeded in asserting his claim to Schleswig in right of his mother, Adolphus' sister.

On 5 March 1460, Christian granted a coronation charter (or Freiheitsbrief), issued first at Ribe (Treaty of Ribe, Danish: Ribe-brevet, German: Vertrag von Ripen) and afterwards at Kiel, which also repeated that Schleswig and Holstein-Rendsburg must remain united "dat se bliven ewich tosamende ungedelt" (Middle Low German or Low Saxon, i.e. that they remain for ever together undivided). Christian's ascension in the County of Holstein-Rendsburg was the first succession in Holstein in female line.

The Treaty of Ribe was a proclamation made by King Christian I of Denmark to a number of German nobles enabling himself to become count of Holstein-Rendsburg and regain the Danish duchy of Schleswig. Another clause gave the nobility the right to revolt should the king break the agreement (a usual feature of medieval coronation charters). Regarding Holstein-Rendsburg, the arrangement was pretty straightforward, the King of Denmark became in personal union count of Holstein-Rendsburg but was not allowed to annex the county, which was part of the Holy Roman Empire, to Denmark proper in real union.

Regarding Schleswig the arrangement seems at first rather odd, since Schleswig was a fief under the Danish crown, thus making the Danish king his own vassal. However, the nobles saw this arrangement as a guarantee against too strong Danish domination and as a guarantee against a partition of Holstein between Danish nobles. The most important consequence of this agreement was the exclusion of Schleswig in subsequent Danish laws (although the medieval Danish Code of Jutland (in Danish: Jyske Lov) was maintained as the legal code of the duchy of Schleswig).

Finally, in 1472 the emperor Frederick III confirmed Christian I's overlordship over Dithmarschen (by claim, conquered only in 1559). Frederick III elevated Christian as Count of Dithmarschen, Holstein-Rendsburg, and Stormarn to Duke of Holstein, thus elevating Holstein-Rendsburg, a Lower Saxon subfief to imperial immediacy. In Holstein-Pinneberg, however, the emperor remained only the indirect overlord with the Lower Saxon Duke John V being the immediate liege lord. In the following period of a hundred years, Schleswig and Holstein were many times divided between heirs. Instead of incorporating South Jutland with the Danish kingdom, however, he preferred to take advantage of the feeling of the estates in Schleswig and Holstein in favour of union to secure both provinces.

An important development was the gradual introduction of German administrators in the duchy of Schleswig leading to a gradual Germanification of southern Schleswig. The Germanification did not catch wind, however, before the end of the eighteenth century.

Schleswig-Holstein soon got a better educational system some centuries before Denmark proper and Norway. The German nobility in Schleswig and Holstein was already a numerous range of people, and education added plenty of people to administrative officials pool of the kings. In 16th and 17th centuries particularly, educated Schleswig-Holsteiners were recruited to government positions in Norway (where they supplanted indigenous lower Norwegian nobility from its public positions, being a cause of them developing more like odalbonde class than privileged) and also in Denmark, where very many government officials came from German stock (but the Danish nobility was not suppressed, they other immersed most successful of the newcomers into their ranks). This feature of Schleswig-Holstein being a utilised source of bureaucrats was a reason of Denmark's governmental half-Germanisation in the subsequent centuries before 19th-century romantics.

== Early modern age ==
=== 16th and 17th centuries ===
Gradual Germanification of southern Schleswig became more intense following the Protestant Reformation, promoted by Duke Christian III in the duchies after his ascension there in 1523 as co-ruling duke with his father King Frederick I. After Christian had succeeded to become also King of Denmark and Norway in 1534 and 1537, respectively, he enforced Lutheranism in all his realm in 1537 (see Reformation in Denmark-Norway and Holstein). The Duchy of Holstein adopted its first Lutheran Church Order in 1542 (written by Bugenhagen). The Counties of Holstein-Pinneberg and Schaumburg remained Catholic until 1559.

With Lutheranism the High German liturgy was introduced in churches in Holstein and the southern half of Schleswig (although the vernacular of more than half of this area was Danish). Whereas at the west coast North Frisian prevailed, about the other half of the South Schleswigers used Low Saxon, which had developed from Middle Low German, as their mother tongue, also prevailing in Holstein. High German started superseding the Danish, Low Saxon and Frisian vernaculars in the area.

After Christian III had consolidated his reign in Denmark and Norway against his adversaries there he concluded with his younger half-brothers, having come of age, to share with them in the rule of the duchies in 1544. Christian III, John II the Elder and Adolf partitioned the Duchies of Holstein (a fief of the Holy Roman Empire) and of Schleswig (a Danish fief) in an unusual way, following negotiations between the brothers and the Estates of the Realm of the duchies, which opposed a factual partition, referring to their indivisibility according to the Treaty of Ribe. The brothers determined their youngest brother Frederick for a career as Lutheran administrator of an ecclesiastical state within the Holy Roman Empire.

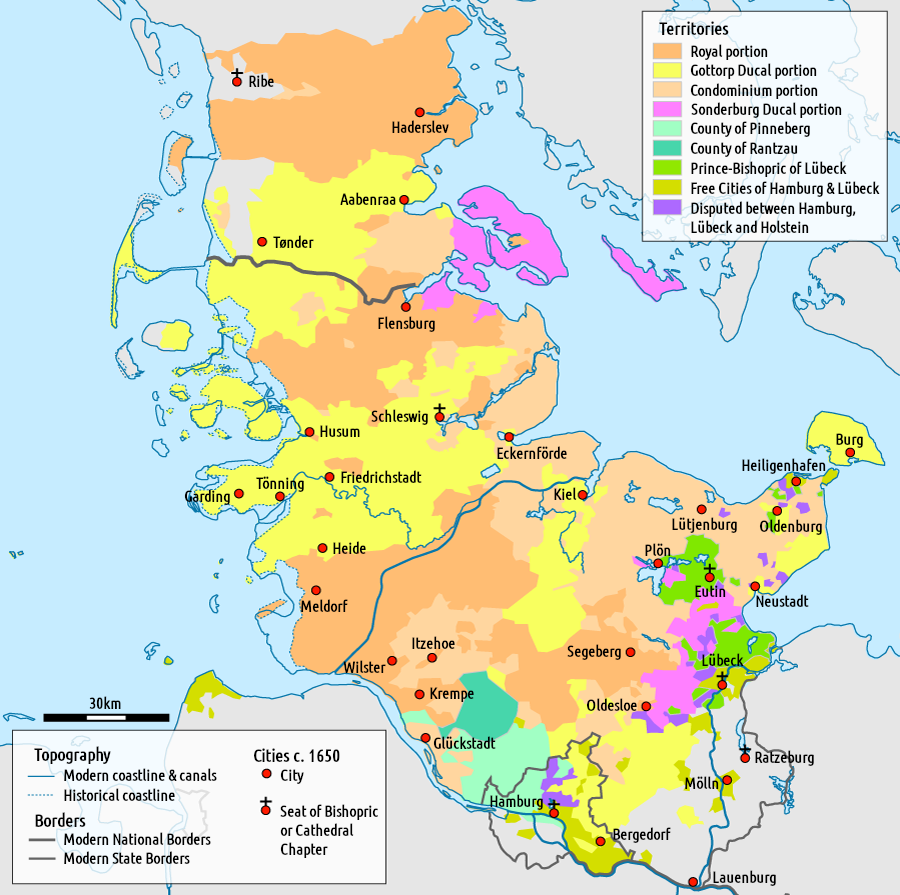
Map of the duchies and neighbouring states around 1650: The separately assigned and commonly held landed estates of the various lines, displayed in different colours.

So the revenues of the duchies, deriving from the rights of overlordship in the various towns and territories of Schleswig and Holstein, were divided in three equal shares by assigning the revenues of particular areas and landed estates, themselves remaining undivided, to each of the elder brothers, while other general revenues, such as taxes from towns and customs dues, were levied together but then shared among the elder brothers. The estates, whose revenues were assigned to the parties, made Holstein and Schleswig look like patchwork rags, technically inhibiting the emergence of separate new duchies, as intended by the estates of the duchies.

The secular rule in the fiscally divided duchies thus became a condominium of the parties. As dukes of Holstein and Schleswig the three rulers bore the formal title of "Duke of Schleswig, Holstein, Dithmarschen and Stormarn". With the independent peasant republic of Dithmarschen only claimed. The House of Schauenburg (Schaumburg) continued its rule in the Counties of Holstein-Pinneberg and Schaumburg.

Adolf, the third son of Frederick I and the second youngest half-brother of King Christian III, founded the dynastic branch called House of Holstein-Gottorp, which is a cadet branch of the then royal Danish House of Oldenburg. The dynastic name Holstein-Gottorp comes as convenient usage from the technically more correct Duke of Schleswig and Holstein at Gottorp, the residential palace. John II the Elder, Duke of Schleswig and Holstein at Haderslev, produced no issue, so no branch emerged from his side. The Danish monarchs and the Dukes of Schleswig and Holstein at Gottorp and Haderslev ruled both duchies together as to general government, however, collected their revenues in their separate estates. In 1559 through the Final Feud they conquered and subjected the peasant republic of Dithmarschen, partitioning it into three shares.

Similar to the above-mentioned agreement Christian III's youngest son John the Younger gained for him and his heirs a share in Holstein's and Schleswig's revenues in 1564, seated in Sønderborg, comprising a third of the royal share, thus a ninth of Holstein and Schleswig in fiscal respect. John the Younger and his heirs, the House of Schleswig-Holstein-Sonderburg (Danish: Slesvig-Holsten-Sønderborg), however, had no share in the condominial rule, they were non-ruling only titular partitioned-off dukes. John the Younger‘s grandsons again partitioned this appanage, Ernest Günther (1609–1689), founding the line of Schleswig-Holstein-Sonderburg-Augustenburg (Danish: Slesvig-Holsten-Augustenborg), and Augustus Philip (1612–1675) that of Schleswig-Holstein-Sonderburg-Beck (known since 1825 as Holstein-Sonderburg-Glücksburg). However, these had no share in the condominial rule and were always mediatised under the King as Duke in Schleswig and Holstein, and no immediate prince under the Emperor as liege lord of Holstein, where they held estates around Plön.

The share of John II the Elder, who died in 1580, was halved between Adolf and Frederick II, thus increasing again the royal share by a fiscal sixth of Holstein and Schleswig.

As an effect the complicated fiscal division of both separate duchies, Holstein and Schleswig, with shares of each party scattered in both duchies, provided them with a condominial government binding both together, partially superseding their legally different affiliation as Holy Roman and Danish fiefs. In 1640 the Princes of Schauenburg were extinct in the male line and the County of Holstein-Pinneberg was merged into the royal share of the Duchy of Holstein. Neither the agnatic heirs of Schauenburg nor Holstein-Pinneberg's liege lord the Lower Saxon Duke Augustus could help it.

During the Thirty Years' War the relations between Duke and King worsened. Finally in 1658, after the Danes had invaded Swedish Bremen-Verden, the Duke cooperated with the Swedes in their counter-attack which almost eradicated the Danish Kingdom. The peace treaties (Treaty of Taastrup and Treaty of Roskilde) stipulated that the Duke of Holstein-Gottorp no longer was a vassal of the Danish Crown in Schleswig. Frederick III, duke from 1616 to 1659, established the principle of primogeniture for his line, and the full sovereignty of his Schleswig dominions was secured to him by his son-in-law Charles X of Sweden by the convention of Copenhagen (May 12, 1658) and to his son Christian Albert (d. 1695) by the Treaty of Oliva, though it was not until after years of warfare that Denmark admitted the claim by the convention of Altona (June 30, 1689).

Christian Albert's son Frederick IV (d. 1702) was again attacked by Denmark, but had a powerful champion in King Charles XII of Sweden, who secured his rights by the Peace of Travendal in 1700. Frederick IV was killed at the Battle of Kliszów in 1702, and his brother Christian August acted as regent for his son Charles Frederick until 1718. In 1713 the regent broke the stipulated neutrality of the duchy in favour of Sweden and Frederick IV of Denmark seized the excuse to expel the duke by force of arms. Holstein was restored to him by the peace of Frederiksborg in 1720, but in the following year king Frederick IV was recognised as sole sovereign of Schleswig by the estates and by the partitioned-off dukes of the Augustenburg and Glücksburg lines.

=== 18th century ===
As Sweden in the 1713 Siege of Tönning had lost its influence on Holstein-Gottorp, Denmark could again subjugate the entire Slesvig to the Danish realm; Holstein-Gottorps lost their lands in Schleswig, but continued as independent Dukes in their portion of Holstein. This status was cemented in the Treaty of Frederiksborg in 1720, by which the prior royal and ducal regions of Schleswig were united under the king, while the Duke remained Duke of Holstein-Gottorp under the German Emperor. The frustrated duke sought support for the recovery of Schleswig in Russia and married into the Russian imperial family in 1725. Russian Empress Elizabeth died childless in 1762, and she had appointed her nephew, Duke Charles Peter Ulrich of Holstein-Gottorp, to be her successor in Russia. When he ascended the throne as Tsar Peter III of Russia, Holstein-Gottorp came to be ruled in personal union by the Emperor of Russia, creating a conflict of territorial claims between Russia and Denmark.

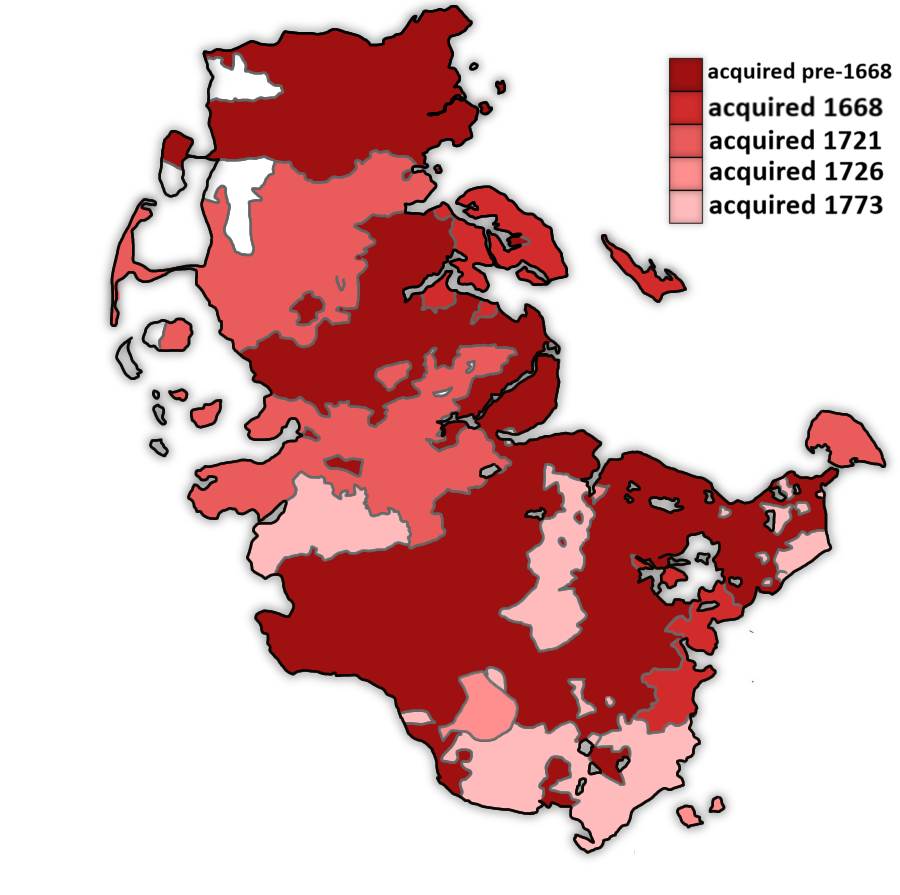
Unification process of Holstein

Peter III threatened war with Denmark for the recovery of his ancestral lands, but before any fighting could begin he was overthrown by his wife, who took control of Russia as Tsarina Catherine II.

Empress Catherine reversed Russia's stance, withdrawing her husband's ultimatum and even entering an alliance with Denmark in 1765. In 1767 Catherine resigned Russia's claims in Schleswig-Holstein, in the name of her son (later Paul I of Russia), who confirmed this action on coming of age in 1773 with the Treaty of Tsarskoye Selo. Oldenburg and Delmenhorst, surrendered by the Danish king in compensation, were handed over to Frederick August, bishop of Lübeck, the second son of Christian August, who thus founded the younger line of the house of Gottorp. Schleswig and Holstein were thus once more united under the Danish king (Christian VII), who now received all Holstein, but that formally under the Empire.

== 19th century ==
On the abolition of the Holy Roman Empire in 1806, Holstein was practically, though not formally, incorporated in Denmark. Under the administration of the Danish prime minister Count Bernstorff, himself from Schleswig, many reforms were carried out in the duchies, for example, abolition of torture and of serfdom; at the same time Danish laws and coinage were introduced, and Danish was made the official language for communication with Copenhagen. Since, however, the Danish court itself at the time was largely German in language and feeling, this produced no serious expressions of resentment.

The settlement of 1806 was reversed, and while Schleswig remained as before, the duchies of Holstein and Lauenburg, the latter acquired in personal union by a territorial swap following the Congress of Vienna, were included in the new German Confederation. The opening up of the Schleswig-Holstein question thus became sooner or later inevitable. The Germans of Holstein, influenced by the new national enthusiasm evoked by the War of Liberation, resented more than ever the attempts of the government of Copenhagen to treat them as part of the Danish monarchy and, encouraged by the sympathy of the Germans in Schleswig, early tried to reassert in the interests of Germanism the old principle of the unity of the duchies. The political atmosphere, however, had changed at Copenhagen also; and their demands were met by the Danes with a nationalist temper as intractable as their own. Affairs were ripe for a crisis, which the threatened failure of the common male heirs to the kingdom and the duchies precipitated.

The Duchy of Schleswig was originally an integrated part of Denmark, but was in medieval times established as a fief under the Kingdom of Denmark, with the same relation to the Danish Crown as for example Brandenburg or Bavaria had to the Holy Roman Emperor. Holstein had as a fief been part of the Holy Roman Empire, and was eventually established as a single united province. Schleswig and Holstein have at different times belonged in part or completely to either Denmark, the Holy Roman Empire, or been virtually independent of both nations. The exception is that Schleswig had never been part of the Holy Roman Empire or the German Confederation before the Second War of Schleswig in 1864. For many centuries, the King of Denmark was both a Danish Duke of Schleswig and a Duke of Holstein within the Holy Roman Empire. The short version is: Schleswig was either integrated in Denmark or a Danish fief, and Holstein was a Holy Roman Imperial fief. Since 1460 both were ruled by the Kings of Denmark with the Dukes of Holstein and Schleswig (since 1544). In 1721 all of Schleswig was united as a single Duchy under the King of Denmark, and the Great Powers of Europe confirmed in an international treaty that all future Kings of Denmark should automatically become Duke of Schleswig and Schleswig would consequently always follow the same line of succession as the one chosen in the Kingdom of Denmark.

The duchy of Schleswig was legally a Danish fief and not part of the Holy Roman Empire or, after 1815, of the German Confederation (German: Deutscher Bund, Danish: Tysk Forbund), but the duchy of Holstein was a Holy Roman fief and a state of both the Empire and later the German Confederation of 1815–1866. It was one of the oddities of both the Holy Roman Empire and of the German Confederation that foreign heads of state could be and often were also members of the constitutional organs of the Empire and the Confederation if they held a territory that was part of the Empire or the Confederation. The King of Denmark had a seat in the organs of the German Confederation because he was also Duke of Holstein and Duke of Lauenburg.

=== Schleswig-Holstein question ===
The Schleswig-Holstein question was the name given to the whole complex of diplomatic and other issues arising in the 19th century out of the relations of the two duchies, Schleswig and Holstein, to the Danish crown on one side and the German Confederation on the other.

In 1806–1815 the government of Denmark had claimed Schleswig and Holstein to be parts of the monarchy of Denmark, which was not popular among the German population in Schleswig-Holstein, who had traditionally the majority in Holstein and had gradually increased its dominance in Schleswig as well. However, this development sparked a German national awakening after the Napoleonic Wars and led to a strong popular movement in Holstein and Southern Schleswig for unification of both with a new Germany (see German unification), turning out to be Prussian-dominated, as it was.

A controversy in the 19th century raged round the ancient indissoluble union of the two duchies, and the inferences to be drawn from it; the Danish National Liberals claimed Schleswig as an integral part of the Danish kingdom; Germans claimed, besides Holstein, being a member state of the German Confederation, also Schleswig. The history of the relations of Schleswig and Holstein thus became of importance in the practical political question.

The childlessness of King Frederick VII of Denmark worked in favour of the movement for the German unification, as did the ancient Treaty of Ribe, which stipulated that the two duchies must never be separated. A counter-movement developed among the Danish population in northern Schleswig and (from 1838) in Denmark, where the Liberals insisted that Schleswig as a fief had belonged to Denmark for centuries and that the Eider River, the historic border between Schleswig and Holstein, should mark the frontier between Denmark and the German Confederation or a new eventually united Germany. The Danish nationalists thus aspired to incorporate Schleswig into Denmark, in the process separating it from Holstein. The movement for the German unity conversely sought to confirm Schleswig's association with Holstein, in the process detaching Schleswig from Denmark and bringing it into the German Confederation.

==== The Danish succession ====
When Christian VIII succeeded his first cousin Frederick VI in 1839 the elder male line of the house of Oldenburg was obviously on the point of extinction, the king's only son and heir having no children. Ever since 1834, when joint succession, consultative estates had been re-established for the duchies, the question of the succession had been debated in this assembly. To German opinion the solution seemed clear enough. The crown of Denmark could be inherited by female heirs (see Louise of Hesse); in the duchy of Holstein the Salic law had never been repealed and, in the event of a failure of male heirs to Christian VIII, the succession would pass to the Dukes of Augustenburg – although this was debatable as the dynasty itself had received Holstein by Christian I of Denmark being the son of the sister of the last Schauenburg, Adolphus VIII.

Danish opinion, on the other hand, clamoured for a royal pronouncement proclaiming the principle of the indivisibility of the monarchy and its transmission intact to a single heir, in accordance with the royal law. To this Christian VIII yielded so far as to issue in 1846 letters patent declaring that the royal law in the matter of the succession was in full force so far as Schleswig was concerned, in accordance with the letters patent of August 22, 1721, the oath of fidelity of September 3, 1721, the guarantees given by France and Great Britain in the same year and the treaties of 1767 and 1773 with Russia. As to Holstein, he stated that certain circumstances prevented him from giving, in regard to some parts of the duchy, so clear a decision as in the case of Schleswig. The principle of the independence of Schleswig and of its union with Holstein were expressly reaffirmed. An appeal against this by the estates of Holstein to the German Federal Assembly received no attention.

On January 28, Christian VIII issued a rescript proclaiming a new constitution which, while preserving the autonomy of the different parts of the country, incorporated them for common purposes in a single organisation. The estates of the duchies replied by demanding the incorporation of Schleswig-Holstein, as a single constitutional state, in the German Confederation.

==== First Schleswig War ====
In March 1848 these differences led to an open uprising by the German-minded Estate assemblies in the duchies in support of independence from Denmark and of close association with the German Confederation. The military intervention of Prussia helped the uprising: the Prussian army drove Denmark's troops from Schleswig and Holstein.

Frederick VII, who had succeeded his father at the end of January, declared (March 4) that he had no right to deal in this way with Schleswig, and, yielding to the importunity of the Eider-Danish party, withdrew the rescript of January (April 4) and announced to the people of Schleswig (March 27) the promulgation of a liberal constitution under which the duchy, while preserving its local autonomy, would become an integral part of Denmark.

A Liberal constitution for Holstein was not seriously considered in Copenhagen since it was a well-known fact that the German political elite of Holstein was far more conservative than the one in Copenhagen. This proved to be true, as the politicians of Holstein demanded that the Constitution of Denmark be scrapped, not only in Schleswig but also in Denmark, as well as demanding that Schleswig immediately follow Holstein and become a member of the German Confederation and eventually a part of the new united Germany.

The rebels established a provisional government at Kiel; and the duke of Augustenburg had hurried to Berlin to secure the assistance of Prussia in asserting around 1848 his rights. This was at the very crisis of the revolution in Berlin, and the Prussian government saw in the proposed intervention in Denmark in a popular cause an excellent opportunity for restoring its damaged prestige. Prussian troops were accordingly marched into Holstein.

This war between Denmark on the one hand and the two duchies and Prussia on the other lasted three years (1848–1850) and only ended when the Great Powers pressured Prussia into accepting the London Convention of 1852. Under the terms of this peace agreement, the German Confederation returned the duchies of Schleswig and Holstein to Denmark. In an agreement with Prussia under the London Protocol of 1852, the Danish government in return undertook not to tie Schleswig more closely to Denmark than to the duchy of Holstein.

In 1848 King Frederick VII of Denmark declared that he would grant Denmark a Liberal Constitution and the immediate goal for the Danish national movement was to secure that this Constitution would not only give rights to all Danes, that is, not only to the Kingdom of Denmark, but also to Danes (and Germans) living in Schleswig. Furthermore, they demanded the protection of the Danish language in Schleswig since the dominating language in almost a quarter of Schleswig had changed from Danish to German since the beginning of the nineteenth century.

Nationalist circles in Denmark advocated annexation of Schleswig (but not of Holstein) as Danish national culture had risen much in past decades.

On April 12, 1848, the federal assembly recognised the provisional government of Schleswig and commissioned Prussia to enforce its decrees, General Wrangel was ordered to occupy Schleswig also. The new provisional government accounted for the respect of the two major languages, neglecting Frisian, in Schleswig and appointed two Lutheran general superintendents one each for parishes of Danish and of German language (Johannes Andreas Rehhoff and Nicolaus Johann Ernst Nielsen, respectively).

But the German movement and Prussia had reckoned without the European powers, which were united in opposing any dismemberment of Denmark. Even Austria, like Holstein a member state of the German Confederation, refused to assist in enforcing the German view. Swedish troops landed to assist the Danes; Nicholas I of Russia, speaking with authority as Head of the elder Gottorp line, pointed out to King Frederick William IV the risks of a collision; Great Britain, though the Danes rejected her mediation, threatened to send her fleet to assist in preserving the status quo.

Frederick William now ordered Wrangel to withdraw his troops from the duchies. The general refused to obey, pleading that he was under the command not of the king of Prussia but of the regent of the German Confederation, Archduke John of Austria, and proposed that, at least, any treaty concluded should be presented for ratification to the Frankfurt Parliament. This the Danes refused; and negotiations were broken off. Prussia was now confronted on one side by the German unification movement urging her clamorously to action, on the other by the European powers threatening with one voice dire consequences should she persist.

On August 26, 1848, after painful hesitation, Frederick William chose what seemed the lesser of two evils, and Prussia signed at Malmö a convention which yielded practically all the Danish demands. The Holstein estates appealed to the Frankfurt Parliament, which hotly took up their cause; but it was soon clear that the provisional government in Frankfurt of the to-be-unified Germany had no means of enforcing its views, and in the end the convention was ratified at Frankfurt.

The convention was only in the nature of a truce establishing a temporary modus vivendi, and the main issues, left unsettled, continued to be hotly debated. At a conference held in London in October, Denmark suggested an arrangement on the basis of a separation of Schleswig from Holstein, which was about to become a member of the eventually united Germany, Schleswig to have a separate constitution under the Danish crown. This was supported by Great Britain and Russia. On January 27, 1849, it was accepted by Prussia and the German Confederation. The negotiations broke down, however, on the refusal of Denmark to yield the principle of the indissoluble union with the Danish crown. On February 23 the truce was at an end, and on April 3, the war was renewed.

The principles which Prussia was commissioned to enforce as the mandatory of the German Confederation were:

1. that they were independent states
2. that their union was indissoluble
3. that they were hereditary only in the male line

At this point the tsar intervened in favour of peace; and Prussia, conscious of her restored strength and weary of the intractable temper of the provisional Frankfurt government, determined to take matters into her own hands.

On July 10, 1849, another truce was signed. Schleswig, until the peace, was to be administered separately, under a mixed commission. Holstein was to be governed by a vicegerent of the German Confederation – an arrangement equally offensive to German and Danish sentiment. A settlement seemed as far off as ever. The Danes of Schleswig still clamoured for the principle of succession in the female line and union with Denmark, the Germans for that of succession in the male line and union with Holstein.

In 1849 the Constitution of Denmark was adopted. This complicated matters further, as many Danes wished for the new democratic constitution to apply for all Danes, including in the Danes in Schleswig. The constitutions of Holstein and Schleswig were dominated by the Estates system, giving more power to the most affluent members of society, with the result that both Schleswig and Holstein were politically dominated by a predominantly German class of landowners.

Thus, two systems of government co-existed within the same state: democracy in Denmark, and the pre-modern estates system in Schleswig and Holstein. The three units were governed by one cabinet, consisting of liberal ministers of Denmark who urged for economical and social reforms, and conservative ministers of the Holstein nobility who opposed political reform. This caused a deadlock for practical lawmaking. Moreover, Danish opponents of this so-called Unitary State (Helstaten) feared that Holstein's presence in the government and, at the same time, membership in the German Confederation would lead to increased German interference with Schleswig, or even into purely Danish affairs.

In Copenhagen, the Palace and most of the administration supported a strict adherence to the status quo. Same applied to foreign powers such as Great Britain, France and Russia, who would not accept a weakened Denmark in favour of the German states, nor acquisition of Holstein (with its important naval harbour of Kiel and control of the entrance to the Baltic) by Prussia.

In April 1850, in utter weariness Prussia proposed a definitive peace on the basis of the status quo ante bellum and the postponement of all questions as to mutual rights. To Palmerston the basis seemed meaningless, the proposed settlement to settle nothing. The emperor Nicholas, openly disgusted with Frederick William's weak-kneed truckling to the Revolution, again intervened. To him the duke of Augustenburg was a rebel; Russia had guaranteed Schleswig to the Danish crown by the treaties of 1767 and 1773; as for Holstein, if the king of Denmark was unable to deal with the rebels there, he himself would intervene as he had done in Hungary.

The threat was reinforced by the menace of the European situation. Austria and Prussia were on the verge of war. The sole hope of preventing Russia from throwing her sword into the scale of Austria lay in settling the Schleswig-Holstein question as Russia desired. Frederick William's only alternative – an alliance with Louis Napoleon, who already dreamed of acquiring the Rhine frontier for France at the price of his aid in establishing German sea power by the cession of the duchies – was abhorrent to him.

==== After the First Schleswig War ====
A peace treaty was signed between Prussia and Denmark on July 2, 1850. Both parties reserved all their antecedent rights. Denmark was satisfied, since the treaty empowered the King to restore his authority in Holstein as Duke with or without the consent of the German Confederation.

Danish troops now marched in to coerce the refractory duchies; but while the fighting went on negotiations among the powers continued, and on August 2, 1850, Great Britain, France, Russia and Norway-Sweden signed a protocol, to which Austria subsequently adhered, approving the principle of restoring the integrity of the Danish monarchy. The provisional Schleswig government was deposed, as were the Lutheran general superintendents, who were even exiled from the Oldenburg-ruled monarchies in 1850. Their position remained vacant with Superintendent Christoph Carl Julius Asschenfeldt officiating per pro.

The Copenhagen government, which in May 1851 made an abortive attempt to come to an understanding with the inhabitants of the duchies by convening an assembly of notables at Flensburg, issued on December 6, 1851, a project for the future organisation of the monarchy on the basis of the equality of its constituent states, with a common ministry; and on January 28, 1852, a royal letter announced the institution of a unitary state which, while maintaining the fundamental constitution of Denmark, would increase the parliamentary powers of the estates of the two duchies. This proclamation was approved by Prussia and Austria, and by the German Federal Assembly insofar as it affected Holstein and Lauenburg. The question of the succession was the next approached. Only the question of the Augustenburg succession made an agreement between the powers impossible, and on March 31, 1852, the duke of Augustenburg resigned his claim in return for a money payment. Further adjustments followed.

Another factor which doomed Danish interests was that not only was the power of German culture rising, but so were conflicts with German States in the south, namely Prussia and Austria. Schleswig and Holstein would, of course and inevitably, become the subject of a territorial dispute involving military encounters among the three states, Denmark, Prussia and Austria.

The Danish government found itself nervous as it became expected that Frederik VII would leave no son, and that upon his death, under Salic law, the possible Crown Princess would have no actual legal right to Schleswig and Holstein (of course that was debatable, as the dynasty itself had received Holstein by Christian I being son of the sister of last Schauenburg count of Holstein, but Salic Law was convenient to German nationalists in this case, furthermore Schleswig was a fief to the kings of Denmark with the Danish Kings Law, Kongeloven). Ethnic-Danish citizens of Schleswig (South Jutland) panicked over the possibility of being separated from their mother country, agitated against the German element, and demanded that Denmark declare Schleswig an integral part of Denmark, which outraged German nationalists.

Holstein was part of the territory of the German Confederation, with which an annexation of whole Schleswig and Holstein to Denmark would have been incompatible. This gave a good pretext to Prussia to engage in war with Denmark in order to seize Schleswig and Holstein for itself, both by pleasing nationalists by 'liberating' Germans from Danish rule, and by implementing the law of the German Confederation.

After the renunciation by the emperor of Russia and others of their eventual rights, Charlotte, Landgravine of Hesse, sister of Christian VIII, and her son Prince Frederick transferred their rights to the latter's sister Louise, who in her turn transferred them to her husband Prince Christian of Glücksburg. On May 8, 1852, this arrangement received international sanction by the protocol signed in London by the five great powers and Norway and Sweden.

On July 31, 1853, Frederick VII of Denmark gave his assent to a law settling the crown on Prince Christian, prince of Denmark, and his male heirs. The protocol of London, while consecrating the principle of the integrity of Denmark, stipulated that the rights of the German Confederation in Holstein and Lauenburg should remain unaffected. It was, in fact, a compromise, and left the fundamental issues unsettled. The German Federal Assembly had not been represented in London, and the terms of the protocol were regarded in German states as a humiliation. As for the Danes, they were far from being satisfied with the settlement, which they approved only insofar as it gave them a basis for a more vigorous prosecution of their unionist schemes.

On February 15 and June 11, 1854, Frederick VII, after consulting the estates, promulgated special constitutions for Schleswig and Holstein respectively, under which the provincial assemblies received certain very limited powers.

On July 26, 1854, Frederick published a common Danish constitution for the whole monarchy; it was little more unitary than a veiled absolutism. In 1854 the Lutheran church bodies of Schleswig and Holstein, until then led by general superintendents, until 1640 titled general provosts, were converted into Lutheran dioceses called Stift Schleswig (Danish: Slesvig Stift) and Stift Holstein (Danish: Holsten Stift), each presided by a Lutheran bishop. Ulrich Sechmann Boesen became Bishop for Schleswig (as of 1854), and Wilhelm Heinrich Koopmann was appointed Bishop for Holstein (in office 1855–1871).

On October 2, 1855, the common Danish constitution was superseded by a parliamentary constitution of a modified type. The legality of this constitution was disputed by the two German great powers, on the ground that the estates of the duchies had not been consulted as promised in the royal letter of December 6, 1851. On February 11, 1858, the federal assembly of the German Confederation refused to admit its validity so far as Holstein and Lauenburg were concerned.

In the early 1860s the "Schleswig-Holstein Question" once more became the subject of lively international debate, but with the difference that support for the Danish position was in decline. The Crimean War had crippled the power of Russia, and France was prepared to renounce support for Danish interests in the duchies in exchange for compensations to herself elsewhere.

Queen Victoria and her consort Prince Albert had sympathy for the German position, but it was tempered by British ministers who saw the growth of German sea power in the Baltic Sea as a danger to British naval supremacy, and consequently Great Britain sided with the Danes. To that was added a grievance about tolls charged on shipping passing through the Danish Straits to pass between the Baltic Sea and the North Sea. To avoid that expense, Prussia planned the Kiel Canal, which could not be built as long as Denmark ruled Holstein.

The secessionist movement continued throughout the 1850s and 1860s, as proponents of German unification increasingly expressed the wish to include two Danish-ruled provinces Holstein and Schleswig in an eventual 'Greater Germany'. Holstein was completely German, while the situation in Schleswig was complex. It was linguistically mixed between German, Danish and North Frisian. The population was predominantly of Danish ethnicity, but many of them had switched to the German language since the 17th century. German culture dominated in clergy and nobility, whereas Danish had a lower social status. For centuries, when the rule of the King was absolute, these conditions had created few tensions. When ideas of democracy spread and national currents emerged from c. 1820, some professed sympathy with German, others with Danish nationality.

The medieval Treaty of Ribe had proclaimed that Schleswig and Holstein were indivisible, albeit in another context. As the events of 1863 threatened to politically divide the two duchies, Prussia was handed a good pretext to engage in war with Denmark to seize Schleswig-Holstein for itself, both by pleasing nationalists in "liberating" Germans from Danish rule, and by implementing the law of the German Confederation.

On July 29, 1853, In response to the renewed Danish claim to Schleswig as integral Danish territory, the German Federal Assembly (instructed by Bismarck) threatened German federal intervention. On November 6, 1853, Frederik VII issued a proclamation abolishing the Danish constitution so far as it affected Holstein and Lauenburg, while keeping it for Denmark and Schleswig. Even this concession violated the principle of the indissoluble union of the duchies, but the German Federal Assembly, fully occupied at home, determined to refrain from further action until the Danish parliament should make another effort to pass a law or budget affecting the whole kingdom without consulting the estates of the duchies.

In July 1860 this happened, and in the spring of 1861 the estates were once more at open odds with the Danish government. The German Federal Assembly now prepared for armed intervention; but it was in no condition to carry out its threats, and Denmark decided, on the advice of Great Britain, to ignore it and open negotiations directly with Prussia and Austria as independent powers. These demanded the restoration of the union between the duchies, a question beyond the competence of the Confederation. Denmark replied with a refusal to recognise the right of any foreign power to interfere in her relations with Schleswig; to which Austria, anxious to conciliate the smaller German princes, responded with a vigorous protest against Danish infringements of the compact of 1852.

Lord John Russell now intervened, on behalf of Great Britain, with a proposal for a settlement of the whole question on the basis of the independence of the duchies under the Danish crown, with a decennial budget for common expenses to be agreed on by the four assemblies, and a supreme council of state consisting in relative proportion of Danes and Germans. This was accepted by Russia and by the German great powers, and Denmark found herself isolated in Europe. The international situation, however, favoured a bold attitude, and she met the representations of the powers with a flat defiance. The retention of Schleswig as an integral part of the monarchy was to Denmark a matter of life and death; the German Confederation had made the terms of the protocol of 1852, defining the intimate relations between the duchies, the excuse for unwarrantable interference in the internal affairs of Denmark.

On March 30, 1863, as a result of this, a royal compact's proclamation was published at Copenhagen repudiating the compacts of 1852, and, by defining the separate position of Holstein in the Danish monarchy, negativing once for all the German claims upon Schleswig.

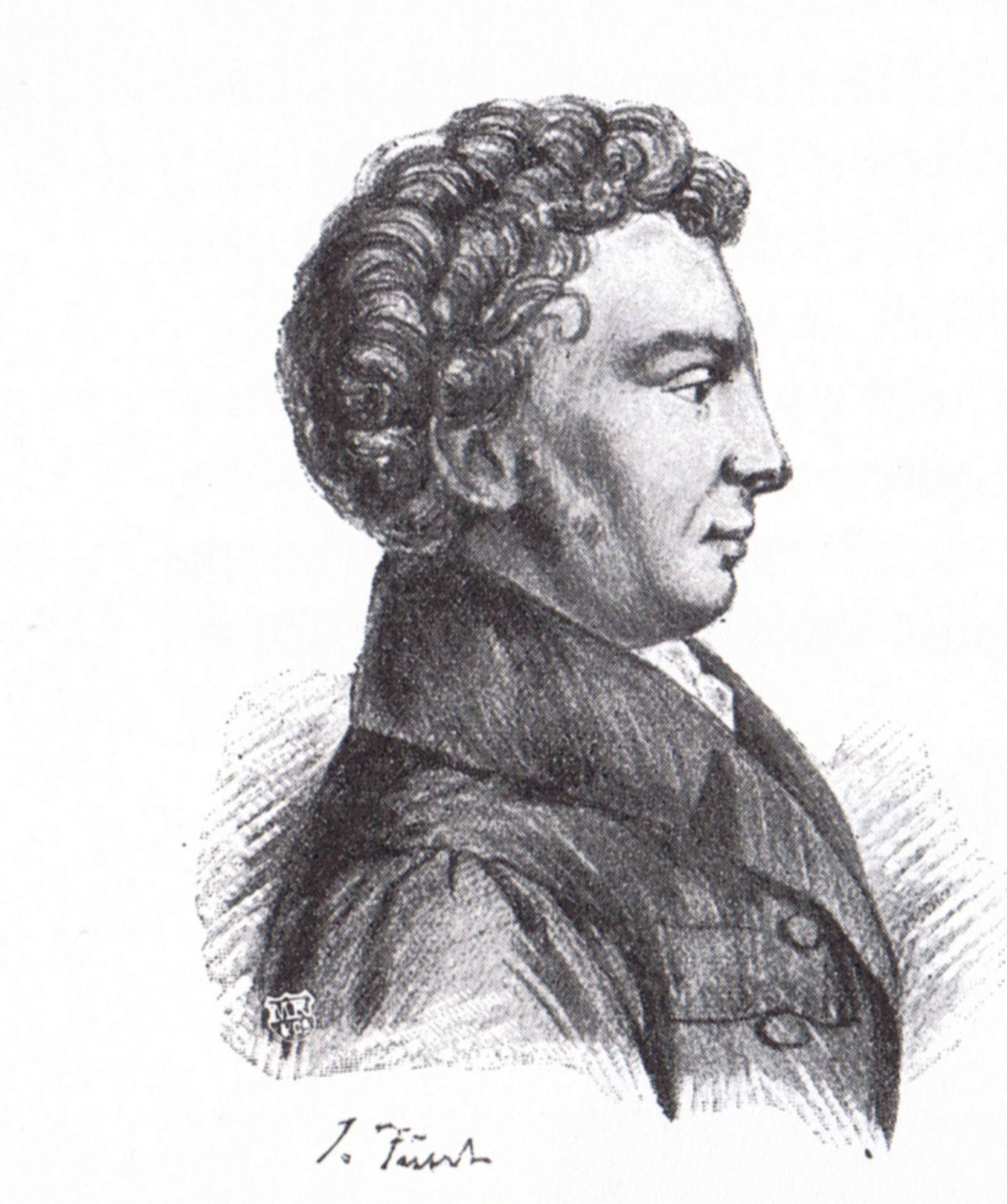
Uwe Jens Lornsen (1793–1838)

Three main movements had evolved, each with its goal:

- A German movement in the two duchies dreamt of an independent Schleswig-Holstein under a liberal constitution. First a personal union with Denmark was outlined, as proposed by Uwe Jens Lornsen in 1830. Later, as it the succession problem appeared and the national sympathies of Danish royalty became evident, the Schleswig-Holstein movement called for an independent state ruled by the house of Augustenburg, a cadet branch of the Danish royal House of Oldenburg. The movement largely ignored the fact that the northern half of Schleswig was predominantly Danish-minded.
- In Denmark, nationalists wished a "Denmark to the Eider River", implying a reincorporation of Schleswig into Denmark and an end to the century-long German dominance in this region's politics. This scenario would mean a total exclusion of Holstein from the Danish monarchy, barring the conservative aristocracy of Holstein from Danish politics, thus easing liberal reforms. The Eider movement underestimated the German element of Southern Schleswig or thought they could be re-convinced of their Danish heritage.
- A less vociferous, but more influential stance was the keeping of the Danish unitary state as it was, one kingdom and two duchies. This would avoid any partition, but it would also not solve the ethnical controversy and the constitutional issues. Most Danish civil servants and the major powers of Russia, Britain and France supported this status quo.
- A fourth scenario, that Schleswig and Holstein should both be incorporated into Prussia as a mere province, was hardly considered before or during the war of 1864. However, it was to be the outcome after the Austro-Prussian War two years later.

As the heirless king Frederick VII grew older, Denmark's successive National-Liberal cabinets became increasingly focused on maintaining control of Schleswig following the king's future death. Both duchies were ruled by the kings of Denmark and shared a long mutual history, but their association with Denmark was extremely complex. Holstein was a member of the German Confederation. Denmark, and Schleswig (as it was a Danish fief), were outside the German Confederation. German nationalists claimed that the succession laws of the two duchies were different from the similar law in Denmark. Danes, however, claimed that this only applied to Holstein, but that Schleswig was subject to the Danish law of succession. A further complication was a much-cited reference in the 1460 Treaty of Ribe stipulating that Schleswig and Holstein should "be together and forever unseparated". As counter-evidence, and in favour of the Danish view, rulings of a Danish clerical court and a German Emperor, of 1424 and 1421 respectively, were produced.

In 1863 King Frederick VII of Denmark died leaving no heir. According to the line of succession of Denmark and Schleswig, the crowns of both Denmark and Schleswig would now pass to Duke Christian of Glücksburg (the future King Christian IX), the crown of Holstein was considered to be more problematic. This decision was challenged by a rival pro-German branch of the Danish royal family, the House of Augustenburg (Danish: Augustenborg) who demanded, like in 1848, the crowns of both Schleswig and Holstein. This happened at a particularly critical time as work on a new constitution for the joint affairs of Denmark and Schleswig had just been completed with the draft awaiting his signature. In the Duchy of Lauenburg the personal union with Denmark ended and her estates elected a new dynasty in 1865.

==== The November Constitution ====
The new so-called November Constitution would not annex Schleswig to Denmark directly, but instead, create a joint parliament (with the medieval title Rigsraadet) to govern the joint affairs of both Denmark and Schleswig. Both entities would maintain their individual parliaments as well. Most importantly, Article I clarified the question of succession: "The form of government shall be that of a constitutional monarchy. The royal authority shall be inherited. The law of succession is specified in the law of succession of July 31, 1853, applying for the entire Danish monarchy."

Denmark's new king, Christian IX, was in a position of extraordinary difficulty. The first sovereign act he was called upon to perform was to sign the new constitution. To sign was to violate the terms of the London Protocol which would probably lead to war. To refuse to sign was to place himself in antagonism to the united sentiment of his Danish subjects, which was the basis of his reign. He chose what seemed the lesser of two evils, and on November 18 signed the constitution.

The news was seen as a violation of the London Protocol, which prohibited such a change in the status quo. It was received in German states with manifestations of excitement and anger. Frederick, Duke of Augustenburg, son of the prince who in 1852 had renounced the succession to the duchies, now claimed his rights on the ground that he had no share in the renunciation. In Holstein, agitation in his favor had begun from the first, and this was extended to Schleswig when the terms of the new Danish constitution became known. His claim was enthusiastically supported by the German princes and people, and in spite of the negative attitude of Austria and Prussia, the federal assembly at the initiative of Otto von Bismarck decided to occupy Holstein pending the settlement of the decree of succession.

==== Second Schleswig War ====
On December 24, 1863, Saxon and Hanoverian troops marched into the German duchy of Holstein in the name of the German Confederation, and supported by their presence and by the loyalty of the Holsteiners the duke of Augustenburg assumed the government under the style of Duke Frederick VIII.

It was clear to Bismarck that Austria and Prussia, as parties to the London Protocol of 1852, must and uphold the succession as fixed by it, and that any action they might take in consequence of the violation of that compact by Denmark must be so correct as to deprive Europe of all excuse for interference. The publication of the new constitution by Christian IX was in itself sufficient to justify them. As to the ultimate outcome of their effective intervention, that could be left to the future to decide. Austria had no clear views. King William wavered between his Prussian feeling and a sentimental sympathy with the duke of Augustenburg. Bismarck alone knew exactly what he wanted, and how to attain it. "From the beginning", he said later (Reflections, ii. 10), "I kept annexation steadily before my eyes."

After Christian IX of Denmark merged Schleswig (not Holstein) into Denmark in 1863 following his accession to the Danish throne that year, Bismarck's diplomatic abilities finally convinced Austria to participate in the war, with the assent of the other European large powers and under the auspices of the German Confederation. The protests of Great Britain and Russia against the action of the German federal assembly, together with the proposal of Count Beust, on behalf of Saxony, that Bavaria should bring forward in that assembly a formal motion for the recognition of Duke Frederick's claims, helped Bismarck to persuade Austria that immediate action must be taken.

On December 28 a motion was introduced in the federal assembly by Austria and Prussia, calling on the Confederation to occupy Schleswig as a pledge for the observance by Denmark of the compacts of 1852. This implied the recognition of the rights of Christian IX, and was indignantly rejected; whereupon the federal assembly was informed that the Austrian and Prussian governments would act in the matter as independent European powers.

On January 16, 1864, the agreement between them was signed. An article drafted by Austria, intended to safeguard the settlement of 1852, was replaced at Bismarck's instance by another which stated that the two powers would decide only in concert on the relations of the duchies, and that they would in no case determine the question of the succession save by mutual consent; and Bismarck issued an ultimatum to Denmark demanding that the November Constitution should be abolished within 48 hours. This was rejected by the Danish government.

The Austrian and Prussian forces crossed the Eider into Schleswig on February 1, 1864, and war was inevitable. An invasion of Denmark itself had not been part of the original programme of the allies; but on February 18 some Prussian hussars, in the excitement of a cavalry skirmish, crossed the frontier and occupied the village of Kolding. Bismarck determined to use this circumstance to revise the whole situation. He urged upon the Austrians the necessity for a strong policy, so as to settle once for all not only the question of the duchies but the wider question of the German Confederation; and Austria reluctantly consented to press the war. On March 11 a fresh agreement was signed between the powers, under which the compacts of 1852 were declared to be no longer valid, and the position of the duchies within the Danish monarchy as a whole was to be made the subject of a friendly understanding.

Meanwhile, however, Lord John Russell on behalf of Great Britain, supported by Russia, France and Sweden, had intervened with a proposal that the whole question should once more be submitted to a European conference. The German powers agreed on condition that the compacts of 1852 (London Protocol) should not be taken as a basis, and that the duchies should be bound to Denmark by a personal tie only. But the proceedings of the conference, which opened at London on April 25, only revealed the inextricable tangle of the issues involved.

Beust, on behalf of the Confederation, demanded the recognition of the Augustenburg claimant; Austria leaned to a settlement on the lines of that of 1852; Prussia, it was increasingly clear, aimed at the acquisition of the duchies. The first step towards the realization of this latter ambition was to secure the recognition of the absolute independence of the duchies, and this Austria could only oppose at the risk of forfeiting her whole influence among the German states. The two powers, then, agreed to demand the complete political independence of the duchies bound together by common institutions. The next move was uncertain. As to the question of annexation Prussia would leave that open, but made it clear that any settlement must involve the complete military subordination of Schleswig-Holstein to herself. This alarmed Austria, which had no wish to see a further extension of Prussia's already overgrown power, and she began to champion the claims of the duke of Augustenburg. This contingency, however, Bismarck had foreseen and himself offered to support the claims of the duke at the conference if he would undertake to subordinate himself in all naval and military matters to Prussia, surrender Kiel for the purposes of a Prussian war-harbour, give Prussia the control of the projected Kiel Canal, and enter the Prussian Customs Union. On this basis, with Austria's support, the whole matter might have been arranged without—as Beust pointed out—the increase of Prussia's power beyond the Elbe being any serious menace to Austrian influence in Germany.

Austria, the other leading state of the German Confederation, was reluctant to engage in a "war of liberation" because of its own problems with various nationalities. After Christian IX of Denmark merged Schleswig into Denmark in 1863 following his accession to the Danish throne that year, Bismarck's diplomatic abilities finally convinced Austria to participate in the war, with the assent of the other European large powers and under the auspices of the German Confederation.

On June 25 the London conference broke up without having arrived at any conclusion. On the 24th, in view of the end of the truce, Austria and Prussia had arrived at a new agreement, the object of the war being now declared to be the complete separation of the duchies from Denmark. As the result of the short campaign that followed, the preliminaries of a treaty of peace were signed on August 1, the king of Denmark renouncing all his rights in the duchies in favour of the emperor of Austria and the king of Prussia.

The definitive treaty was signed at Vienna on October 30, 1864. By Article XIX, a period of six years was allowed during which the inhabitants of the duchies might opt for Danish nationality and transfer themselves and their goods to Denmark; and the right of indigenat was guaranteed to all, whether in the kingdom or the duchies, who enjoyed it at the time of the exchange of ratifications of the treaty.

This Second War of Schleswig of 1864 was presented by invaders to be an implementation of the law of the German Confederation (Bundesexekution). After the defeat in the Battle of Dybbøl, the Danes were unable to defend the borders of Schleswig, then had to retreat to Denmark proper, and finally were pushed out of the entire Jutland peninsula. Denmark capitulated and Prussia and Austria took over the administration of Schleswig and Holstein respectively under the Gastein Convention of August 14, 1865. Already in 1864 the Prussian occupying authorities had deposed Bishop Sechmann Boesen.

The north border of Schleswig-Holstein as from 1864 to 1920 differs a little from the north border of the modern Danish county of Sønderjylland: in the east Hejls and the Skamlingsbanke hill were not in Schleswig-Holstein but are now in Sønderjylland county; in the west Hviding and Rejsby were in Schleswig-Holstein. They used to be in Ribe County before the 2007 Danish Municipal Reform.

==== After the Second Schleswig War ====
It did not take long for disagreements between Prussia and Austria over both the administration and the future of the duchies to surface. Bismarck used these as a pretext to engineer what became the Austro-Prussian War of 1866. Austria's defeat at the Battle of Königgrätz was followed by the dissolution of the German Confederation and Austria's withdrawal from Holstein, which, along with Schleswig, in turn was annexed by Prussia.

Following the Austro-Prussian War of 1866, section five of the Peace of Prague stated that the people of Northern Schleswig should be granted the right to a referendum on whether they would remain under Prussian rule or return to Danish rule. This promise was never fulfilled, neither by Prussia, nor by united Germany (as of 1871).

In any case, because of the mix of Danes and Germans who lived there and the various feudal obligations of the players, the Schleswig-Holstein Question problem was considered intractable by many. Lord Palmerston said of the issue that only three people understood the Schleswig-Holstein question: one was dead, the other had gone insane, and the third was himself, but he had forgotten it.

This was convenient for Palmerston, as the government knew that Britain was almost powerless on the continent and had no chance of countering Prussia's military or manufacturing might. Meanwhile, in 1864, the Danish royal family, impressed by Victoria's trappings of Empire, arranged the marriage of the Princess to the future Edward VII, so helping to reverse the Anglo-German alliance, which led to the 1914 war. Niall Ferguson in Empire quotes Kitchener in 1914: "We haven't an army, and we have taken on the foremost military power in Europe".

The Schleswig-Holstein Question from this time onwards became merged in the larger question of the general relations of Austria and Prussia, and its later developments are a result of the war of 1866. It survived, however, as between Danes and Germans, though narrowed down to the question of the fate of the Danish population of the northern duchy. This question is of great interest to students of international law and as illustrating the practical problems involved in the assertion of the modern principle of nationality.

In the Austro-Prussian War of 1866 Prussia took Holstein from Austria, and seized Austria's German allies, the defeated Kingdom of Hanover, Electorate of Hesse, Duchy of Nassau, and the republic of the city-state of Frankfurt. The annexed states became provinces of Prussia, the Holstein and Schleswig merged in the Province of Schleswig-Holstein. The Lutheran Stifter Schleswig and Holstein were merged in the new Evangelical Lutheran State Church of Schleswig-Holstein in 1867. In 1868 the Holy See established the Prefecture Apostolic of Schleswig-Holstein for Catholic parishioners.

=== Danes under German rule ===
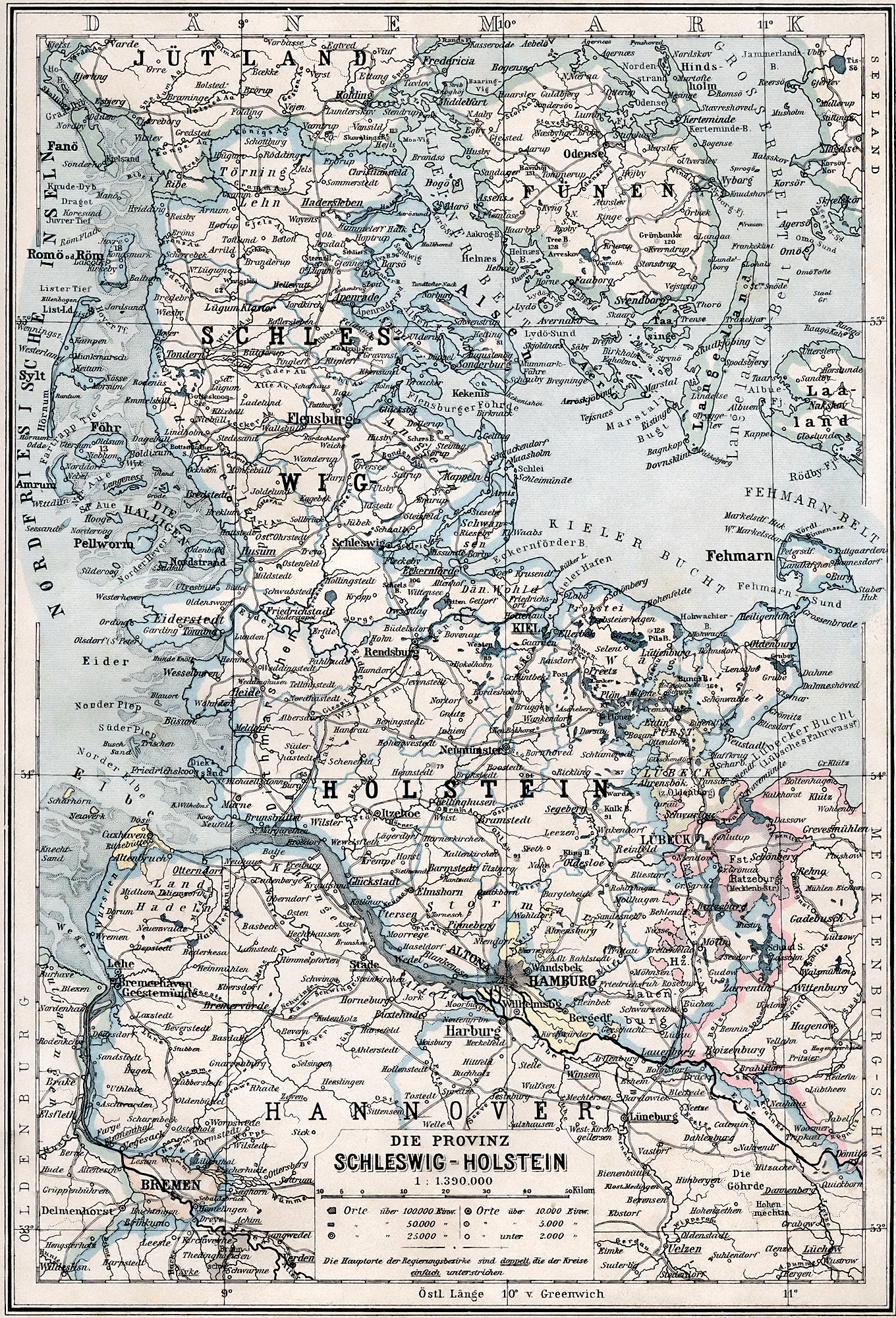
Map of the Prussian Province of Schleswig-Holstein as of 1905.

The position of the Danes in Schleswig after the cession was determined, so far as treaty rights are concerned, by two instruments: the Treaty of Vienna (October 30, 1864) and the Peace of Prague (August 23, 1866). Under Article XIX of the former treaty the Danish subjects domiciled in the ceded territories had the right, within six years of the exchange of ratifications, of opting for the Danish nationality and transferring themselves, their families and their personal property to Denmark, while keeping their landed property in the duchies. The last paragraph of the Article ran:

The right of an indigenous person, as well in the kingdom of Denmark as in the Duchies, is preserved for all individuals who have it at the time of the exchange of the ratifications of this Treaty. (Note: French: "Le droit d'indigénat, tant dans le royaume de Danemark que dans les Duchés, est conservé à tous les individus qui le possèdent a l'époque de l'échange des ratifications du présent Traité.")

By Article V of the Peace of Prague, Schleswig was ceded by Austria to Prussia with the reservation that the populations of the North of Schleswig shall be again united with Denmark in the event of their expressing a desire so to be by a vote freely exercised. Taking advantage of the terms of these treaties, about 50,000 Danes from North Schleswig (out of a total population of some 150,000) opted for Denmark and were expelled across the frontier, pending the plebiscite which was to restore their country to them. The plebiscite never came. Its inclusion in the treaty had been no more than a diplomatic device to save the face of the emperor Napoleon III; Prussia had from the first no intention of surrendering an inch of the territory that had been conquered; the outcome of the Franco-German War made it unnecessary to pretend that the plebiscite might occur; and by the Treaty of Vienna of October 11, 1878, the clause relating to the plebiscite was formally abrogated with the assent of Austria.

Meanwhile, the Danish optants, disappointed of their hopes, had begun to stream back over the frontier into Schleswig. By doing so they lost, under the Danish law, their rights as Danish citizens, without acquiring those of Prussian subjects; and this disability was transmitted to their children. By Article XIX of the Treaty of 1864, indeed, they should have been secured the rights of indigenacy, which, while falling short of complete citizenship, implied, according to Danish law, all the essential guarantees for civil liberty. But in then Prussian law the right of Indigenat is not clearly differentiated from the status of a subject; and the supreme court at Kiel decided in several cases that those who had opted for Danish citizenship had forfeited their rights under the Indigenat paragraph of the Treaty of Vienna.

Thus, in the frontier districts, a large and increasing class of people dwelt in a sort of political limbo, having lost their Danish citizenship through ceasing to be domiciled in Denmark, and unable to acquire Prussian citizenship because they had failed to apply for it within the six years stipulated in the Treaty of 1864. Their exclusion from the rights of Prussian subjects was due, however, to causes other than the letter of the treaty.

The Danes, in spite of every discouragement, never ceased to strive for the preservation and extension of their national traditions and language; the Germans were equally bent on effectually absorbing these recalcitrant Teutons into the general life of the German empire; and to this end the uncertain status of the Danish optants was a useful means. Danish agitators of German nationality could not be touched so long as they were careful to keep within the limits of the law; pro-Danish newspapers owned and staffed by German subjects enjoyed immunity in accordance with the constitution, which guarantees the liberty of the press.

The case of the optants was far different. These unfortunates, who numbered a large proportion of the population, were subject to domiciliary visits, and to arbitrary perquisitions, arrest and expulsion. When the pro-Danish newspapers, after the expulsion of several optant editors, were careful to appoint none but German subjects, the vengeance of the authorities fell upon optant type-setters and printers. The Prussian police, indeed, developed a capacity for detecting optants: and since these were mingled indistinguishably with the mass of the people, no household and no business was safe from official inquisition.

One instance, out of many, may serve to illustrate the type of offence that served as excuse for this systematic official persecution. On April 27, 1896, the second volume for 1895 of the Sønderjyske Aarboger was confiscated for having used the historic term Sønderjylland (South Jutland) for Schleswig. To add to the misery, the Danish government refused to allow the Danish optants expelled by Prussia to settle in Denmark, though this rule was modified by the Danish Nationality Law of 1898 in favour of the children of optants born after the passing of the law. It was not until the signature of the treaty between Prussia and Denmark on January 11, 1907, that this Treaty of Conditions was ended.

By this treaty, the German January government undertook to allow all children born of Danish optants before the passing of the new Danish Nationality Law of 1898 to acquire Prussian nationality on the usual conditions and on their own application. This provision was not to affect the ordinary legal rights of expulsion as exercised by either power but the Danish government undertook not to refuse to the children of Schleswig optants who should not seek to acquire or who could not legally acquire Prussian nationality permission to reside in Denmark. The provisions of the treaty apply not only to the children of Schleswig optants, but to their direct descendants in all decrees.

For forty years Germanism, backed by all the weight of the empire and imposed with all the weapons of official persecution, had barely held its own in North Schleswig; despite an enormous emigration, in 1905, 139,000 of the 148,000 inhabitants of North Schleswig spoke Danish, while of the German-speaking immigrants it was found that more than a third spoke Danish in the first generation, although from 1864 onward, German had gradually been substituted for Danish in the churches, the schools, and even in the playground. But the scattered outposts of Germanism could hardly be expected to acquiesce without a struggle in a situation that threatened them with social and economic extinction. Forty years of dominance, secured by official favour, had filled them with a double measure of aggressive pride of race, and the question of the rival nationalities in Schleswig, like that in Poland, remained a source of trouble and weakness within the frontiers of the German empire.

After 1888, German was the only language of instruction in schools in Schleswig.

== 20th century ==
=== After World War I ===
After Germany had lost World War I, in which Denmark had been neutral, the victors offered Denmark a chance to redraw the border between Denmark and Germany. The sitting government of Carl Theodor Zahle chose to hold the Schleswig Plebiscite to let the inhabitants of Schleswig decide which nation they, and the land they lived on, should belong to. King Christian X of Denmark, supported by various groups, was opposed to the division. Using a clause in the Danish constitution that the king appointed and dismissed the Danish cabinet, and using the justification that he felt the Danish population was at odds with Zahle's politics, the king dismissed Zahle and asked Otto Liebe to form the Cabinet of Liebe to manage the country until a parliamentary election could be held and a new cabinet formed.

Since Zahle's cabinet had support from a small majority in the Folketing, his Social Liberal Party and the allied Social Democrats felt that the king had effectively staged a state coup against the Danish democracy. A general strike was organised by Fagbevægelsen to put pressure on the king and his allies. As Otto Liebe was unable to organise an election, M. P. Friis replaced him after a week, and succeeded in holding the election, and as a result the Social Liberal Party lost half their electoral support and their rivals the Liberal Party were able to form the minority cabinet led by Niels Neergaard: the Cabinet of Neergaard II. The whole affair was called the Easter Crisis of 1920.

The Allied powers arranged a referendum in Northern and Central Schleswig. In Northern Schleswig on February 10, 1920, 75% voted for reunification with Denmark and 25% voted for Germany. In Central Schleswig on March 14, 1920, the results were reversed; 80% voted for Germany and just 20% for Denmark, primarily in Flensburg. While in Northern Schleswig some smaller regions (for example Tønder) had a clear majority of voters for Germany, in Central Schleswig all regions voted for Germany. No vote ever took place in the southern third of Schleswig, because the result for Germany was predictable. On June 15, 1920, North Schleswig officially returned to Danish rule. Germany continued to hold the whole of Holstein and South Schleswig, remaining within the Prussian province of Schleswig-Holstein. The Danish-German border was the only one of the borders imposed on Germany following World War I which was never challenged by Hitler.

=== World War II ===
In the Second World War, after Nazi Germany occupied the whole of Denmark, there was agitation by local Nazi leaders in Schleswig-Holstein to restore the pre-World War I border and re-annex to Germany the areas granted to Denmark after the plebiscite, as the Germans did in Alsace-Lorraine in the same period. However, Hitler vetoed any such step, out of a general German policy at the time to base the occupation of Denmark on a kind of accommodation with the Danish Government, and avoid outright confrontations with the Danes.

=== After World War II ===
After Germany had lost World War II there again was a possibility that Denmark could reacquire some of its lost territory in Schleswig. Though no territorial changes came of it, it had the effect that Prime Minister Knud Kristensen was forced to resign after a vote of no confidence because the Folketing did not support his enthusiasm for incorporating South Schleswig into Denmark.

Today, there are still a Danish minority in Southern Schleswig and a German minority in Northern Schleswig.

Following the expulsion of Germans after World War II, Schleswig-Holstein absorbed a large number of German refugees, causing the population of the state to increase by 33% (860,000 people).

== See also ==
- Danish exonyms for places in Germany
- David Blackbourn, History of Germany, 1780–1918
- German exonyms for places in Denmark
- List of rulers of Schleswig-Holstein
- Timeline of Lübeck
