= Henry VIII the Sparrow =

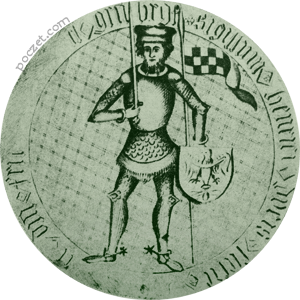
- Seal of Henry VIII the Sparrow
- Born: c. 1357
- Died: 14 March 1397; Szprotawa
- Noble family: Silesian Piasts of Głogów
- Spouse: Katharina of Opole
- Issue: Jan I Henry IX the Elder; Henry X Rumpold; Wenceslaus of Krosno
- Father: Henry V the Iron
- Mother: Anna of Płock

Henry VIII (VI) the Sparrow (Polish: Henryk VIII Wróbel; c. 1357 – 14 March 1397) was Duke of Żagań–Głogów from 1368 to 1378 (as a co-ruler with his brothers), after 1378 ruler over Zielona Góra, Szprotawa, Kożuchów, Przemków and Sulechów, and after 1395 ruler over half of Głogów, Ścinawa and Bytom Odrzański. He was the second son of Henry V the Iron, Duke of Żagań–Głogów, by his wife Anna, daughter of Duke Wenceslaus of Płock. The origin of his nickname "Sparrow" (Wróbel) is unknown.

== Life ==
After his father's death in 1369 Henry VIII ruled the Duchy of Żagań-Głogów jointly with his older brothers Henry VI and Henry VII Rumpold. However, he could take full power over the government only after the division of the duchy between them in 1378. Henry VIII received the towns of Kożuchów, Zielona Góra, Szprotawa, Sława, Nowe Miasteczko and Przemków. In 1382 Duke Władysław of Opole gave his daughter Katharina to Henry VIII in marriage. The couple received the government of the Opole cities of Prudnik and Głogówek as dowry. However, later Henry VIII had to give up Głogówek to his father-in-law's widow Euphemia of Masovia as her dower and he only could retain Prudnik. In 1393 Henry VIII acquired the rights of succession over the Duchy of Żagań after the death of his older brother Henry VI, but he only could take possession over after the death of his sister-in-law (Henry VI's widow) Hedwig of Legnica, because in the late duke's will she received his lands as her dower (at the end, Henry VIII never received Żagań for his early death; his sons inherited the duchy after Hedwig's resignation in 1403). Two years later, in 1395, Henry VIII took possession over Głogów after the death of his brother Henry VII Rumpold without issue.

Henry VIII had a slightly different character than his brothers. He loved banquets, games and knight tournaments. This lifestyle required large amounts of money, and in consequence, the duke had continuous financial problems. His major financial obligations were to Konrad II the Gray, Duke of Oleśnica, who after his death received Ścinawa as a payment. Later, he tried to obtain the church's goods. This ended with his excommunication imposed by the Bishop of Wrocław. Coincidentally the duke died shortly after as a result of severe wounds obtained during a knights' tournament in Legnica. His funeral took place in an atmosphere of scandal: his body was not buried for eight days until the church received financial compensation for the duke's behavior. He was buried in the Augustinian church in Żagań.

== Marriage and issue ==
In 1382 Henry VIII married Katharina (ca. 26 March 1367 – 6 June 1420), daughter of Duke Władysław of Opole. They had five children:

1. Jan I (ca. 1385 – 12 April 1439)
2. Henry IX the Elder (ca. 1389 – 11 November 1467)
3. Henry X Rumpold (ca. 1390 – 18 January 1423)
4. Wenceslaus (ca. 1391 – before 4 February 1431)
5. Anna (ca. 1397 – 1426/33), married before 28 May 1417 to Duke Casimir I of Oświęcim.

In his will, he left his widow the towns of Prudnik, Kożuchów and Zielona Góra as her dower, which she ruled until her death.

Henry VIII the Sparrow House of Piast Born: c. 1357 Died: 14 March 1397
Preceded by Henry V of Iron	Duke of Żagań; 1369–1378; With: Henry VII and Henry VIII	Succeeded by Henry VI the Elder
Preceded by Henry V of Iron	Duke of Glogów (1/2); 1369–1378; With: Henry VII and Henry VIII	Succeeded by Henry VII Rumpold
Preceded by Henry V of Iron	Duke of Ścinawa (1/2); 1369–1378; With: Henry VII and Henry VIII	Succeeded by Henry VII Rumpold
Preceded by Henry VII Rumpold	Duke of Glogów (1/2); 1395–1397	Succeeded by Jan I Henry IX the Elder; Henry X Rumpold; Wenceslaus
Preceded by Henry VII Rumpold	Duke of Ścinawa (1/2); 1395–1397	Succeeded by Konrad II the Gray
