= Henryk VII =

Henryk VII may refer to:

- Henry VII of Brzeg (1343/45 – 1399)
- Henry VII Rumpold (ca. 1350 – 1395)
