= Henryk VI =

Henryk VI may refer to:

- Henry VI the Good (1294–1335)
- Henry VI the Elder (before 1345 – 1393)
