= Henry V the Iron =

- Duke of Żagań
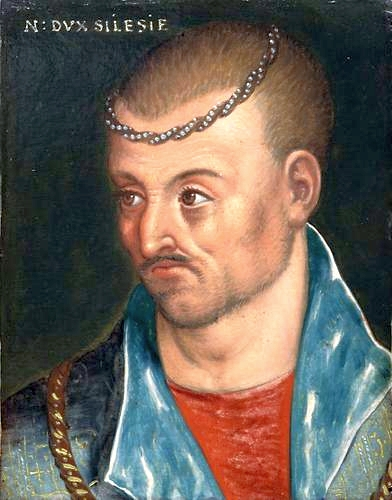
- Born: c. 1319
- Died: after 8 April 1369
- Noble family: Silesian Piasts of Głogów
- Spouse: Anna of Płock
- Issue: Henry VI the Elder; Anna; Jadwiga of Żagań; Henry VII Rumpold; Henry VIII the Sparrow
- Father: Henry IV the Faithful
- Mother: Matilda of Brandenburg-Salzwedel

Henry V (III) (Polish: Henryk V; c. 1319 – after 8 April 1369), was a Duke of Żagań since 1342, from 1349 Duke of half-Głogów, and from 1363 Duke of half-Ścinawa. He was the only son of Henry IV (II) the Faithful, Duke of Żagań, by his wife Matilda, daughter of Herman, Margrave of Brandenburg-Salzwedel. Henry was nicknamed Henry the Iron (Żelazny) for the consistency and ruthlessness of his acts. Immediately after he took control over the government, he oriented his politics towards recovery lands that were lost during his late father's rule.

== Life ==
The young Henry V gained his political experience at the side of his father, taking part in negotiations with his Jan of Ścinawa in 1341, who give Wschowa to them. A year later, the death of his father made Henry V the new ruler of Żagań.

In 1343 Henry V refused to pay tribute to Bohemia and tried to recover Głogów, which was occupied by King John of Bohemia after the death of his uncle Przemko II in 1331. At the same time, King Casimir III the Great of Poland used the confusion that reigned in Silesia to take Wschowa. In the subsequent conflict, supported by his uncles Konrad I of Oleśnica and Jan of Ścinawa, Henry V forced the retreat of the Polish troops under the walls of Ścinawa. However, thanks to the losses among Konrad I's army, the Polish king was able to retain the last Greater Poland lands which had been in the hands of Henry III's descendants.

Although his defeat was not too serious, Henry V sent a message to Casimir III the Great, asking for peace. The Polish troops left Żagań, and a meeting between the king and Henry V took place. Casimir III treated him with honors and left him all the lands who he had occupied during the conflict, except Wschowa.

The conflict with the Polish king prevented Henry V from developing a strong resistance against King John of Bohemia. An agreement was finally made on 7 June 1344, under which King John gave Henry V half of the Duchy of Głogów (however, he only could take formal possession of the land in 1349); in exchange, the Duke of Żagań was forced to declare himself a vassal of Bohemia and paid tribute to King John. The ceremony took place on 23 November of that year in Prague.

The events of 1344 involved Henry V in the Bohemian politics, and a year later, when war broke out between Silesia and Bohemia, the Duke of Żagań supported his sovereign with troops while he tried to recover Wschowa.

As a vassal of Bohemia, Henry V also participated in many ceremonies and diplomatic activities on behalf of King John and later his son and successor, Charles IV, for example in Charles's coronation on 1 September 1347 in Prague, two years later when he joined to the King's suite in a trip to Avignon and Aachen, and finally in 1355 when he travel to Italy and witnessed the King's imperial coronation in Rome.

The Duke of Żagań's faithful service was rewarded in 1351, when, after the death of Bolesław III of Płock (Henry V's brother-in-law) without issue (and according to the 1329 treaty signed between King John of Bohemia and Duke Wenceslaus of Płock), the emperor granted him title to this duchy. However, the quick actions of King Casimir III the Great, who immediately after Bolesław III's death took control over Płock, prevented Henry V from obtaining this land.

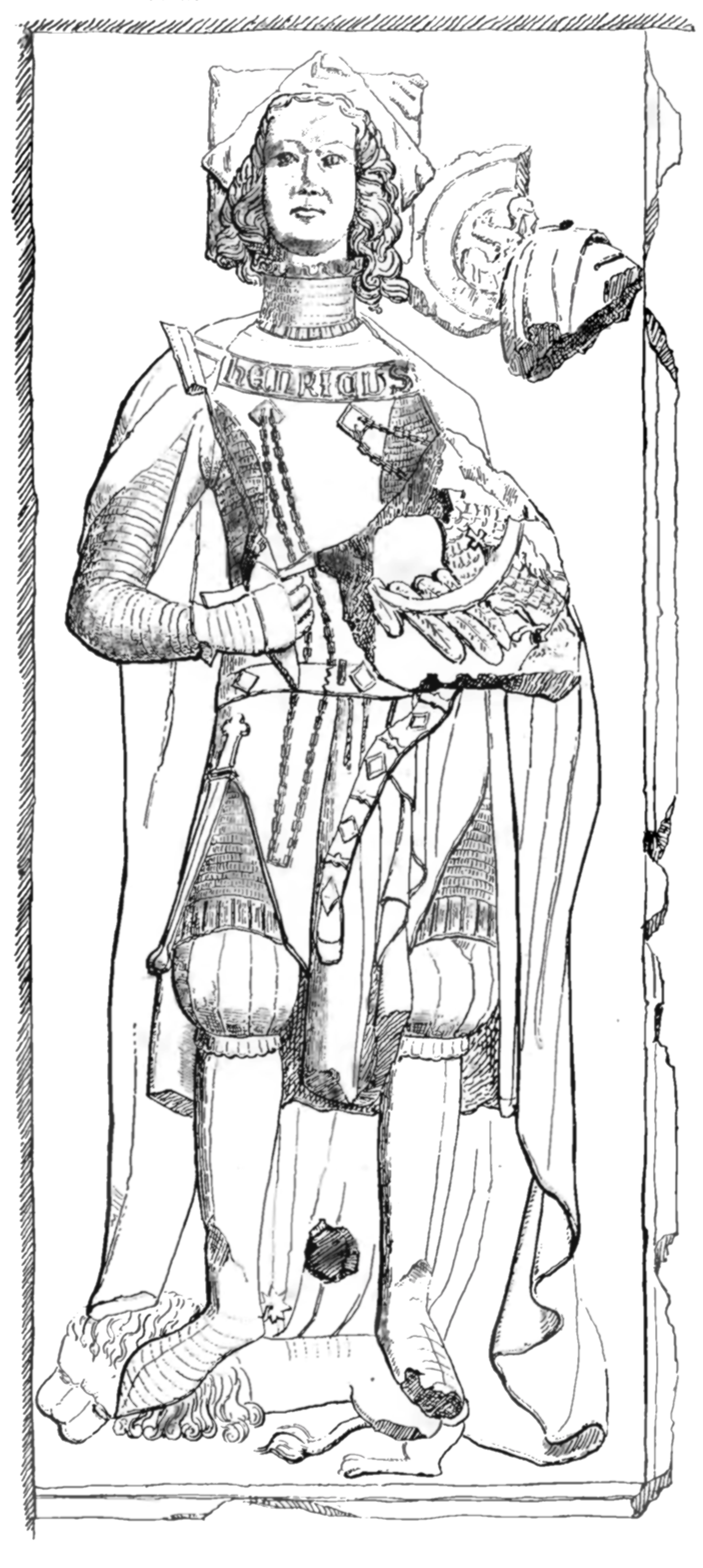
Drawing of Henry's tomb effigy

In 1356, together with Nicholas the Small, Duke of Ziębice, Henry V was involved in a diplomatic mission to Constantinople, where he took part in the pilgrimage to Palestine.

Upon his return Henry V extend his possessions. He purchased (mostly from Jan of Ścinawa) the towns of Nowogród Bobrzański, Ryczeń, half of Ścinawa, and the area between the Odra River and Barycz called Międzyrzecze. Another success was the purchase of the half of Góra after Jan's death in 1365. Shortly after, Henry V paid the sum of 600 fine silver to his only surviving uncle, Konrad I of Oleśnica, for his rights over that land.

In 1360 the relations between Henry V and Emperor Charles IV began to deteriorate. One of the reasons was that the emperor, who decided to restitute to Przemko II's widow the other half of Głogów as her long awaited dower land, but giving the promise of inheritance over Bolko II the Small, Duke of Świdnica. With this action, Henry V lost all his hopes of restoring the unity of Głogów. Soon, he began to visit Kraków and made an alliance with the King Casimir III the Great. In order to strengthen this bond, a political marriage was arranged between Henry V's daughter Hedwig and King Casimir III. With this union, the Polish king increased his influence over Silesia, and the Duke of Żagań gained an ally and protector. The wedding took place on 25 February 1363 in Wschowa and was performed by the Bishop of Poznań, Jan V of Lutogniewo.

Henry V was regarded as a good host, although he was famous for his excessive severity with his subjects. He did not differentiate between the church or the aristocracy when he had to distribute justice. Particularly embarrassing were his continuous disputes with the Augustinian order of Żagań. His rule proved too harsh in that he had to face the fury of his own vassals, who even kidnapped him, but shortly afterwards released him in the basement of St. Jakob's Church in Głogów.

In 1367 as a result of an inflammation in his eyes, Henry V became blind. He died of pneumonia two years later and was buried in the Augustinian church in Żagań.

== Marriage and issue ==
By 6 September 1337, Henry V married Anna (1324 – 16 February 1363), daughter of Duke Wenceslaus of Płock. They had five children:

1. Henry VI the Elder (before 1345 – 5 December 1393).
2. Anna (before 1350 – after 14 July 1405), married by 20 January 1361 to Duke John I of Opava-Ratibor.
3. Hedwig (after 1350? – 27 March 1390), married firstly on 25 February 1363 to King Casimir III the Great of Poland and secondly by 10 February 1372 to Duke Rupert I of Legnica.
4. Henry VII Rumpold (ca. 1350 – 24 December 1395).
5. Henry VIII the Sparrow (ca. 1357 – 14 March 1397).

Henry V the Iron House of Piast Born: c. 1319 Died: after 8 April 1369
Preceded by Henry IV the Faithful	Duke of Żagań; 1342–1369	Succeeded by Henry VI the Elder; Henry VII Rumpold; Henry VIII the Sparrow
Preceded by Direct rule of the Kingdom of Bohemia last holder Henry I	Duke of Glogów (1/2); 1349–1369 (Note: The other half was given to Bolko II the Small in 1361.)	Succeeded by Henry VI the Elder; Henry VII Rumpold; Henry VIII the Sparrow
Preceded by Jan	Duke of Ścinawa (1/2); 1365–1369 (Note: The other half was sold by Jan to Bolko II the Small in 1365.)	Succeeded by Henry VI the Elder; Henry VII Rumpold; Henry VIII the Sparrow
