= London Protocol (1852) =

Treaty on Schleswig-Holstein

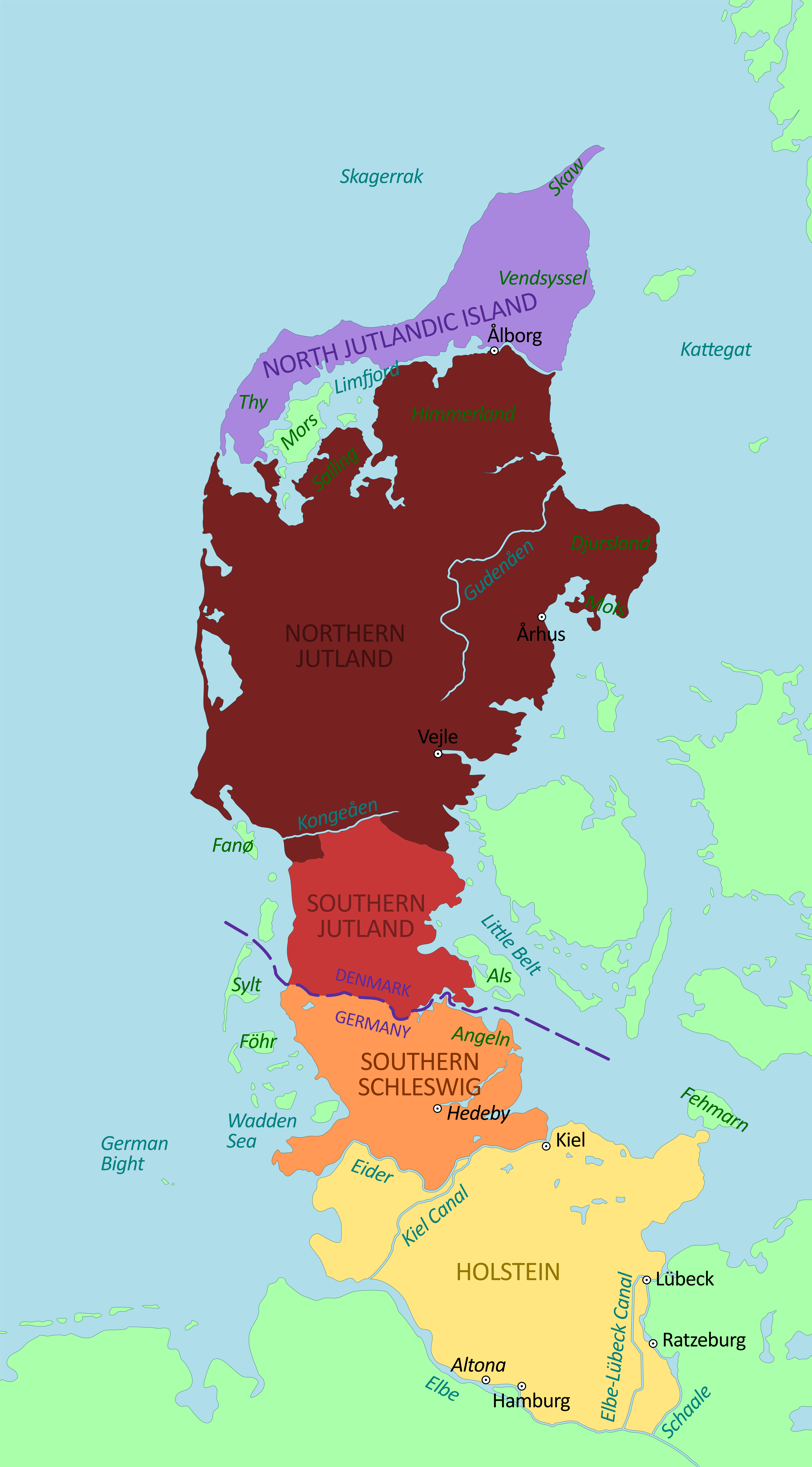
Parts of the Jutland Peninsula North Jutlandic Island (Danish) Northern Jutland (Danish) Northern Schleswig (Danish until 1864; German from 1864 until 1920; Danish since 1920) Southern Schleswig (Danish until 1864; German since 1864) Holstein

On 8 May 1852, after the First War of Schleswig, an agreement called the London Protocol (German: Londoner Protokoll; Danish: Londonprotokollerne) was signed. This international treaty was the revision of an earlier protocol, which had been ratified on 2 August 1850, by the major German powers of Austria and Prussia. The second London Protocol was recognised by the five major European powers—Austria, France, Prussia, Russia, and the United Kingdom—as well as by the Baltic Sea powers of Denmark and Sweden.

The Protocol affirmed the integrity of the Danish federation as a "European necessity and standing principle". Accordingly, the duchies of Schleswig (a Danish fief) and of Holstein and Lauenburg (German fiefs) were joined by personal union with the Kingdom of Denmark. However, Frederick VII of Denmark was childless, so a change in dynasty was imminent and the lines of succession for the duchies and Denmark diverged. That meant that, contrary to the Protocol, the new king of Denmark would not also be the new duke of Holstein and Lauenburg. So for this purpose, the line of succession to the duchies was modified. Further, it was affirmed that the duchies were to remain as independent entities, and that Schleswig would have no greater constitutional affinity to Denmark than Holstein did.

In 1851, the Russian emperor Nicholas I had recommended that Prince Christian of Schleswig-Holstein-Sonderburg-Glücksburg (born 1818) should be advanced in the Danish succession, and this proposal was confirmed by the London Protocol on 8 May 1852, when Prince Christian was chosen to follow Frederick VII's aging uncle Ferdinand in the line of succession. A justification for this choice was Christian's marriage in 1842 to Louise of Hesse-Kassel, who was a daughter of the closest female relative of Frederick VII. Louise's mother and elder siblings renounced their rights in favor of Louise and her husband.

The decision of the London Protocol was implemented by the Danish Law of Succession of 31 July 1853 entitled Royal Ordinance settling the Succession to the Crown on Prince Christian of Glücksburg. This designated him as second-in-line to the Danish throne, following the elderly Prince Ferdinand. Consequently, Prince Christian and his family were granted the titles of Prince and Princess of Denmark and the style of Highness.

The major powers primarily wanted to ensure, by guaranteeing Denmark's territorial integrity, that the strategically significant port of Kiel would not fall into Prussian hands. Eleven years later, this treaty became the trigger for the German–Danish war of 1864. Prussia and Austria declared that Denmark had violated the Protocol by introducing the November Constitution, which Christian IX of Denmark signed on 18 November 1863. After an initial period of joint Austro–Prussian administration, Kiel was ultimately delivered to Prussia in 1867.
