= Wenceslaus of Krosno =

Polish nobleman (born c. 1391)

Wenceslaus
- Duke of Żagań-Głogównot
- Born: c. 1391
- Died: before 4 February 1431
- Noble family: Silesian Piasts of Głogów
- Father: Henry VIII the Sparrow
- Mother: Katharina of Opole

Wenceslaus of Krosno (Polish: Wacław; c. 1391 – before 4 February 1431) was a Duke of Żagań-Głogów during 1397–1412 (as co-ruler with his brother), ruler over Głogów (with his brothers as co-rulers) during 1412–17, and ruler over Krosno Odrzańskie, Świebodzin and Bytnica after 1417.

He was the fourth and youngest son of Henry VIII the Sparrow, Duke of Głogów by his wife Katharina, daughter of Duke Władysław of Opole.

== Life ==
After his father's early death in 1397, Wenceslaus and his older brothers succeeded him as co-rulers of the lands, but remained under the care of their mother and settled their residence in Kożuchów, which, together with Zielona Góra, was her dower. The official guardianship of the young princes and the regency of the Duchy were held by Duke Rupert I of Legnica until 1401, when Wenceslaus's older brother Jan I attained his majority and assumed the government of the Duchy and the custody of his younger brothers by himself.

In 1412, the formal division of their Duchy occurred: Jan I retained Żagań; Wenceslaus, together with his brother Henry IX the Older and Henry X Rumpold, obtained Głogów as co-rulers. In 1417, another duchy was divided, this time the Duchy of Głogów. Henry IX the Older and Henry X Rumpold retained Głogów and Szprotawa, while Wenceslaus received the towns of Krosno Odrzańskie, Świebodzin and Bytnica.

Wenceslaus was a vassal of the Emperor Sigismund, taking part in his coronation as King of Bohemia in Prague on 28 July 1420, three years later in the congress of Pressburg (now Bratislava), and finally in the war against the Hussites.

Wenceslaus died around 1431, after accidentally shooting himself while handling a gun without precaution. He died unmarried and childless. After his death, all his lands were inherited by his brother, Henry IX.

Preceded by Henry VIII the Sparrow	Duke of Glogów (1/2); 1397–1417; With: Jan I (until 1412), Henry IX and Henry X	Succeeded by Henry IX the Older and Henry X Rumpold
Preceded by Hedwig	Duke of Żagań; 1403–1412; With: Jan I, Henry IX and Henry X	Succeeded by Jan I
