= Henry X Rumpold =

Duke of Głogów
- Reign: 1401–1423
- Predecessor: Rupert I of Legnica
- Successor: Henry IX the Older

Duke of Żagań
- Reign: 1403–1412
- Predecessor: Hedwig of Legnica
- Successor: Jan I of Żagań
- Born: c. 1390
- Died: 18 January 1423
- Burial: Haderslev Cathedral
- House: Piast
- Father: Henry VIII the Sparrow
- Mother: Catherine of Opole
- Religion: Catholic

Henry X Rumpold, Duke of Żagań also known as the Younger (Polish: Henryk X Rumpold or Młodszy; c. 1390 – 18 January 1423), was a Duke of Żagań-Głogów during 1397–1412 (as co-ruler of his brothers) and since 1412 ruler over Głogów (as co-ruler of his brother).

He was the third son of Henry VIII the Sparrow, Duke of Głogów by his wife Catherine, daughter of Duke Władysław of Opole.

== Life ==
After the early death of his father in 1397, Henry X was first under the care of his mother and the guardianship of Duke Rupert I of Legnica, and since 1401 under the tutelage of his older brothers Jan I and Henry IX the Older.

In 1412 was made the formal division of the paternal lands. Henry X, received together with his brothers Henry IX and Wenceslaus the Duchy of Głogów; however, he wasn't interested in the internal affairs of the Duchy and leave all the government in the hands of Henry IX.

Henry X remained at the service of the Emperor Sigismund. In 1420, together with his brothers, he participated in the great congress of Wrocław, where he paid homage to the emperor. Also, he took part in expeditions against the Hussites, and shortly after was appointed Governor of the Upper Lusatia. After the death of his mother, he inherited, together with Henry IX, the towns of Kożuchów and Zielona Góra.

Under the service of Emperor Sigismund, Henry X was a mediator in international affairs, and he was sent in a diplomatic mission to Denmark, where after successfully negotiations with the King Eric, was arranged his betrothal with the King's first cousin Adelaide (1410 – after 1445), daughter of Duke Bogislaw VIII of Pomerania-Stargard; but he died soon after in a military camp in Flubsberg. He was buried in Haderslev.

Preceded by Henry VIII the Sparrow	Duke of Glogów (1/2); 1397–1423; With: Jan I (until 1412), Henry IX and Wenceslaus (until 1417)	Succeeded by Henry IX the Older
Preceded by Hedwig	Duke of Żagań; 1403–1412; With: Jan I, Henry IX and Wenceslaus	Succeeded by Jan I
