= Henry VII Rumpold =

Henry VII (V) Rumpold also known as the Middle or the Greater (Polish: Henryk VII Rumpold or Średni, Większy; b. ca. 1350 – d. 24 December 1395), was a Duke of Żagań-Głogów during 1368–1378 (as a co-ruler with his brothers) and since 1378 ruler over half of Głogów, Ścinawa and Bytom Odrzański.

He was the second son of Henry V the Iron, Duke of Żagań-Głogów, by his wife Anna, daughter of Duke Wenceslaus of Płock. The contemporary sources are often called him "Rumpold", and also Middle (Średni) to distinguish him from his older and younger brothers, who bore the same name, and Greater (Większy) due to his height and weight.

== Life ==
After his father's death in 1369, Henry VII ruled the Duchy of Żagań-Głogów jointly with his older brother Henry VI and his younger brother Henry VIII the Sparrow. In 1378 the Duchy was divided into three parts: Henry VII obtain the eastern part, who included Głogów, Góra, Ścinawa and Bytom Odrzański (actually only a half of this lands; the other half belonged to the Bohemian crown since 1360). After the division, Henry VII used the title of Lord of Głogów and Ścinawa.

In 1381 Henry VII demanded his younger brother Henry VIII the Sparrow pay tribute to the Duchy of Głogów.

In 1383, using the internal difficulties of Poland (the period of interregnum after the death of King Louis) and, with the help of his brothers, they made an attempt to recover Wschowa. The unsuccessful siege led a retaliatory raid against Głogów. In 1391 a second attempt to gain Wschowa was made. The conflict only ended with the agreement signed in Milicz on 7 August 1391 (the treaty was actually a temporary truce, but the military actions ended after that).

During the rest of his reign, Henry VII was in close contact with Duke Konrad II of Oleśnica, who supported him financially and militarily.

Henry VII suffered several health problems in his adulthood. His obesity caused a severe disease in his legs, characterized by open wounds which constantly bled. The progress of the disease was so frightful that at the end of his life he was transported in chairs, or carried in a litter. As a result of complications of his disease, Henry VII died suddenly in Boleslawiec and was buried in the Augustinian church in Żagań.

Despite his disabilities, Henry VII was considered a good ruler. Under his reign Głogów developed his economy well. After his death without issue (he never married), his lands were inherited by his only surviving brother, Henry VIII the Sparrow.

Preceded by Henry V the Iron	Duke of Żagań; 1369–1378; With: Henry VI and Henry VIII	Succeeded by Henry VI the Elder
Preceded by Henry V the Iron	Duke of Glogów (1/2); 1369–1395; With: Henry VI and Henry VIII (until 1378)	Succeeded by Henry VIII the Sparrow
Preceded by Henry V the Iron	Duke of Ścinawa (1/2); 1369–1395; With: Henry VI and Henry VIII (until 1378)	Succeeded by Henry VIII the Sparrow
