= Hedwig of Legnica =

- Duchess of Żagań
- Coat-of-arms of Silesian Piasts
- Born: c. 1351; Poland
- Died: 1409
- Noble family: Piast dynasty
- Husband: Henry VI the Elder
- Father: Wenceslaus I of Legnica
- Mother: Anna of Cieszyn

Hedwig of Legnica (Polish: Jadwiga legnicka) (ca. 1351 – 1 August 1409) was a Polish princess and member of the Piast dynasty, in the Legnica branch. By marriage Hedwig was Duchess of Żagań.

She was the fourth child and only daughter of Wenceslaus I, Duke of Legnica and his wife Anna, daughter of Casimir I, Duke of Cieszyn.

== Life ==
Hedwig married Henry VI the Elder, Duke of Głogów-Żagań, on 10 February 1372. Their union was an unhappy one; after the premature death of their only daughter, the ducal couple became formally separated. Hedwig remained in Żagań and Henry VI moved to Krosno Odrzańskie, where he died on 5 December 1393.

Despite their many years of estrangement, in his will Henry VI left all his lands to Hedwig as her dower. These included the towns of Żagań, Krosno Odrzańskie and Świebodzin. Hedwig ruled over the lands until 1403, when she renounced her rule over them on behalf of Henry VI's nephews.

Preceded by Henry VI the Elder	Duchess of Żagań; 1393–1403	Succeeded by Jan I Henry IX the Elder; Henry X Rumpold; Wenceslaus
