= Henry VI the Elder =

Duke of Glogów, Ścinawa, and Żagań

Henry VI (IV) the Elder (Polish: Henryk VI (IV) Starszy) (bef. 1345 – 5 December 1393) was a Duke of Żagań-Głogów after 1368 (with his brothers as co-rulers until 1378).

He was the oldest son of Henry V the Iron, Duke of Żagań-Głogów, by his wife Anna, daughter of Duke Wenceslaus of Płock.

== Life ==
After his father's death in 1369, Henry VI initially ruled jointly with his younger brothers Henry VII Rumpold and Henry VIII the Sparrow. At this time, the Duchy of Żagań was in a tragic financial situation. In order to improve this, Henry V's sons reduced their expenditures to the minimum. Each of them received only 150 fines cash as a rent from the duchy and they only could hold not more than 20 horses. The situation was aggravated also as a result of the continued interference of Emperor Charles IV in the internal affairs of the Silesian Duchies. In 1375, following the emperor's instructions, the main cities of Góra, Głogów and Ścinawa were divided with the Kingdom of Bohemia.

During 1376–1377 Henry VI fell into a sharp conflict with the Żagań monasteries, whose goods were a rich source of revenue for the duchy's treasure. In 1378, the duchy was divided into three parts between the brothers. Henry VI, as the oldest, chose first, taking the northernmost part, including the capital, Żagań. His possessions also included Krosno Odrzańskie, Nowogród Bobrzański and Świebodzin (also, Henry VI used the title of Lord of Żagań and Lubin).

In 1383, together with younger brother Henry VII Rumpold, he made an attempt to recover the town of Wschowa, which was lost by their father. Shortly after the division of the duchy, the life and political participation of Henry VI in Silesia was clearly narrowing.

On 10 February 1372 Henry VI married Hedwig (ca. 1351 – 1 August 1409), daughter of Duke Wenceslaus I of Legnica. The union was unsuccessful, and after the premature death of their only daughter, they separated. Hedwig remained in Żagań and Henry VI moved to Krosno Odrzańskie. Despite this, Henry VI left his wife all his lands as her dower in his will.

During his stay in Krosno Odrzańskie, Henry VI devoted himself to contemplation and asceticism. He was the only of Henry V's sons to reconcile with the Żagań monasteries' orders.

Henry VI died on 5 December 1393 in Włoszczowa, a village near Lubin County. He was buried in the Augustinian church in Żagań. His widow Hedwig ruled over Żagań, Krosno Odrzańskie and Świebodzin until 1403, when she finally gave the lands to the sons of the youngest brother of Henry VI, Henry VIII the Sparrow.

Henry VI the Elder House of Piast Born: before 1345 Died: 5 December 1393
Preceded by Henry V the Iron	Duke of Żagań with Henry VII (1369-1378); Henry VIII (1369–1393)	Succeeded by Hedwig
Preceded by Henry V the Iron	Duke of Glogów (1/2); 1369–1378 with Henry VII; Henry VIII	Succeeded by Henry VII Rumpold
Preceded by Henry V the Iron	Duke of Ścinawa (1/2) with Henry VII (1369-1378); Henry VIII (1369–1393)	Succeeded by Henry VII Rumpold
