= Refugees in Schleswig-Holstein after the Second World War =

The influx of refugees in Schleswig-Holstein after the Second World War was one of the biggest difficulties faced in Germany in the early post-war period. Per capita, the Province of Schleswig-Holstein of Prussia, later the state of Schleswig-Holstein, took in the second-most refugees and displaced persons from the former eastern territories of Germany between 1944 and 1947, second only to Mecklenburg-Vorpommern. This led to an economic and humanitarian crisis in the state throughout the late 1940s. The situation was only resolved in the 1950s as the Wirtschaftswunder (economic miracle) enabled physical reconstruction, raised living standards, and aided in integrating the hundreds of thousands of new residents.

== Origins ==
Refugees began to enter Schleswig-Holstein as early as 1943, when 200,000 people north of the Lower Elbe fled cities such as Hamburg, which was destroyed by Allied bombing campaigns, to rural areas in neighbouring states. When the Red Army reached the borders of Nazi Germany in 1944, millions of Germans began to flee west. During 1944 and 1945, Kriegsmarine vessels brought over two million people across the Baltic Sea to Mecklenburg and Schleswig-Holstein. When Allied forces reached the western border of Germany, more people began to flee into Schleswig-Holstein, which Allied forces reached only in the very last stages of the war. From March to June 1945 alone, 700,000 refugees and displaced persons settled in towns and villages across the state.

After the war, Schleswig-Holstein became part of the British occupation zone. Over a million Wehrmacht soldiers were interned in two "restricted areas" within the state. It was not until April 1946 that these soldiers were released – 410,000 from the Dithmarschen–Eiderstedt zone and 570,000 from the Plön zone. Even then, over 200,000 former so-called "foreign workers" and forced labourers remained in the camps, and a further 365,000 refugees and displaced persons took refuge in them by the end of 1946.

In the first "all-German" census in October 1946, Schleswig-Holstein recorded a population of 2.6 million, excluding displaced persons. This was an increase of approximately one million from 1939. Excluding the war deaths, this meant that the state was home to approximately three refugees for every four locals. This was much higher than other states, such as Lower Saxony (one refugee to two locals) and Bavaria (one refugee to three locals). The population continued to rise even after the war, reaching 2.7 million in 1949.

== Living conditions and employment ==
Despite extensive bombing of Lübeck and especially Kiel, a relatively large area of Schleswig-Holstein escaped the destruction of the war. In the first few years after the war, only one-fifth of the refugees in the state resided in Flensburg, Kiel, Lübeck and Neumünster. By contrast, the population of the rural Eckernförde and Stormarn districts doubled in the same period; in Rendsburg and Eiderstedt, the increase was 65%. In some areas, the influx was overwhelming; the town of Großhansdorf was home to 1,500 locals alongside 3,500 refugees.

The influx of new residents triggered a massive crisis due to lack of housing, food, and employment. Rooms and apartments had to be shared or given up, and kitchens and toilets shared. Since many of the ceded rooms and emergency accommodations were unheated, stoves were set up for warmth. Coal and wood were scarce and expensive, so peat was used as fuel wherever possible. Wool was collected from fences and spun to make clothing, with other material taken from old uniforms, blankets, and bedding. In the first years after the war, the state faced a chronic food shortage; refugees and displaced persons were particularly affected. The food available via ration cards was not sufficient, and many people resorted to the black market, harvest work, or taking food from fields to get by.

All employees and workers suffered from the job shortage in the first few years, but the refugees and displaced persons were hit harder than locals. Many lacked the skills required for the available work; even overqualified workers had to retrain and accept what was available. Of 69,000 refugees who had formerly been self-employed, most had worked in agriculture; of this group, only one-fifth had their own business again by 1949. The Refugee Settlement Act of August 1949, and the so-called "30,000 Hectare Agreement", which obliged large landowners to surrender land, provided relief. Nonetheless, by 1958, only 4,246 displaced persons ran their own agricultural or forestry operations, and only half of them were over 10 hectares. Craftsmen suffered less - their services in the repair of consumer goods were sorely needed after the war. More than half of the 2,368 businesses registered state-wide in 1946 were run by refugees or displaced persons. Many fishermen who fled East Prussia also found employment in Kiel.

On 1 April 1950, there were still 728 refugee camps in Schleswig-Holstein, housing a total of 127,756 people. To keep the camps clean, access to sanitation and visits were regulated. The state government had already recognized in 1948 that there was simply not enough work available in Schleswig-Holstein, and half a million refugees could only find wages in other states. A plan to relocate large numbers of refugees was therefore one of the first measures taken by the new federal government upon the formation of the Federal Republic of Germany. By 1960, 400,000 refugees and displaced persons from Schleswig-Holstein had left the state, mainly for North Rhine-Westphalia and Baden-Württemberg. As a result, the state's population declined substantially, to 2.3 million.

== Conflict ==
Given the catastrophic situation, in October 1945 provincial president Otto Hoevermann warned of tensions between the refugees and the local inhabitants. He believed an "emergency community" was required to resolve the economic and social crisis in the state. In addition to material hardship, there was friction and in some cases open hatred between groups. Some feared that Low Prussian and East Pomeranian dialects would displace Low German, while others complained about weddings between the residents and refugees. During Denazification, refugees were able to exonerate themselves of affiliation with the Nazis more easily than the locals since they lacked certificates and papers.

In his book Kalte Heimat ("Cold Homeland"), historian Andreas Kossert describes examples of prejudice directed against refugees and displaced persons by locals in Schleswig-Holstein. Records of violent sentiment survive, such as „In de Nordsee mit dat Schiet“ ("Into the North Sea with that shit [the refugees]"). In 1947, the Danish minority magazine Slesvigeren published a cartoon titled "Pied Piper", depicting Minister-President Hermann Lüdemann leading a pack of rats, labeled "refugees", to South Schleswig.

In southern Schleswig, a large number of the locals turned to the Danish minority. The South Schleswig Association, which represents the Danes, grew from 2,700 members to 62,000 between the end of the war and 1946. Many of the new members had no Danish background, did not speak Danish, and had typical German names; these so-called "New Danes", who were often disparagingly called Speckdänes ("Bacon Danes"), hoped for the separation of southern Schleswig from the rest of Germany and the expulsion of the refugees.

The British authorities decided that in order to counter the widespread discontent and to prevent potential conflict, refugees should be involved in the future development of the state, and that political parties dedicated specifically to their interests should be banned. This ban was lifted in 1948. The German authorities, and later the appointed and elected state governments, took into account the intention of the occupation authorities, albeit placing less importance on these issues.

== Politics ==
In 1950, the League of Expellees and Deprived of Rights (BHE) was formed, a right-wing party appealing to refugees and displaced persons. In the Schleswig-Holstein state election in 1950, the BHE performed exceedingly well, winning 23.4% of votes and becoming the second largest party in the state Landtag. This stoked fears of a "takeover" by refugees, but the BHE ultimately joined a coalition government with the moderate Christian Democratic Union, which provided Minister-President Walter Bartram, and the liberal Free Democratic Party. Notably, the coalition also included the "South Schleswig Community", represented by the German Party, a group formed by local Schleswig-Holsteiners to oppose the BHE. The formation of this government eased tensions between the two groups.

The BHE's popularity declined after 1950, though it retained a more significant presence in Schleswig-Holstein than in other states. As the economic miracle resolved many of the difficulties of refugees, the party attempted to broaden its appeal to nationalist voters and ex-Nazis, and in the process lost much support among its core demographic. After adding "All-German Bloc" to its name, the GB/BHE won 14.0% in Schleswig-Holstein in 1954 and 6.9% in 1958, before losing its seats in 1962.

== Economic miracle ==
Throughout the 1950s, the economic miracle saw a rise in living standards and a boom in the economy nationwide, including in Schleswig-Holstein. The relocation of many refugees to other states began, easing pressure on the economy and particularly housing. The number of unemployed refugees finally began to fall: from 135,144 in 1951 to 22,143 in 1957.

When capital and building materials became available at the beginning of the decade, reconstruction began. Purely refugee-populated settlements such as Trappenkamp emerged and the first systematic, uniform and centrally controlled post-war housing construction program began. It took place under the leadership of the trade unions and was implemented at 84 locations in 50 cities and municipalities across the state. The foundation stone was laid on 5 March 1950 in Neumünster. In many cities and municipalities, street names - Ostpreußenring (East Prussia Circle), Pommernweg (Pomerania Way), Breslauer Straße (Breslau Street), and many others - serve as symbols of the origin of the people who moved there.

== Memorials ==
In 2011, the Center Against Expulsions curated the exhibition "Arrived - The Integration of Expellees in Germany", followed in 2013 by "Foreign Home - Refugees and Displaced Persons in Schleswig-Holstein after 1945".
