= Collegiate Church of the Assumption of the Blessed Virgin Mary, Głogów =

Church building in Głogów, Poland

Collegiate Church of the Assumption of the Blessed Virgin Mary
- Kolegiata Wniebowzięcia Najświętszej Maryi Panny
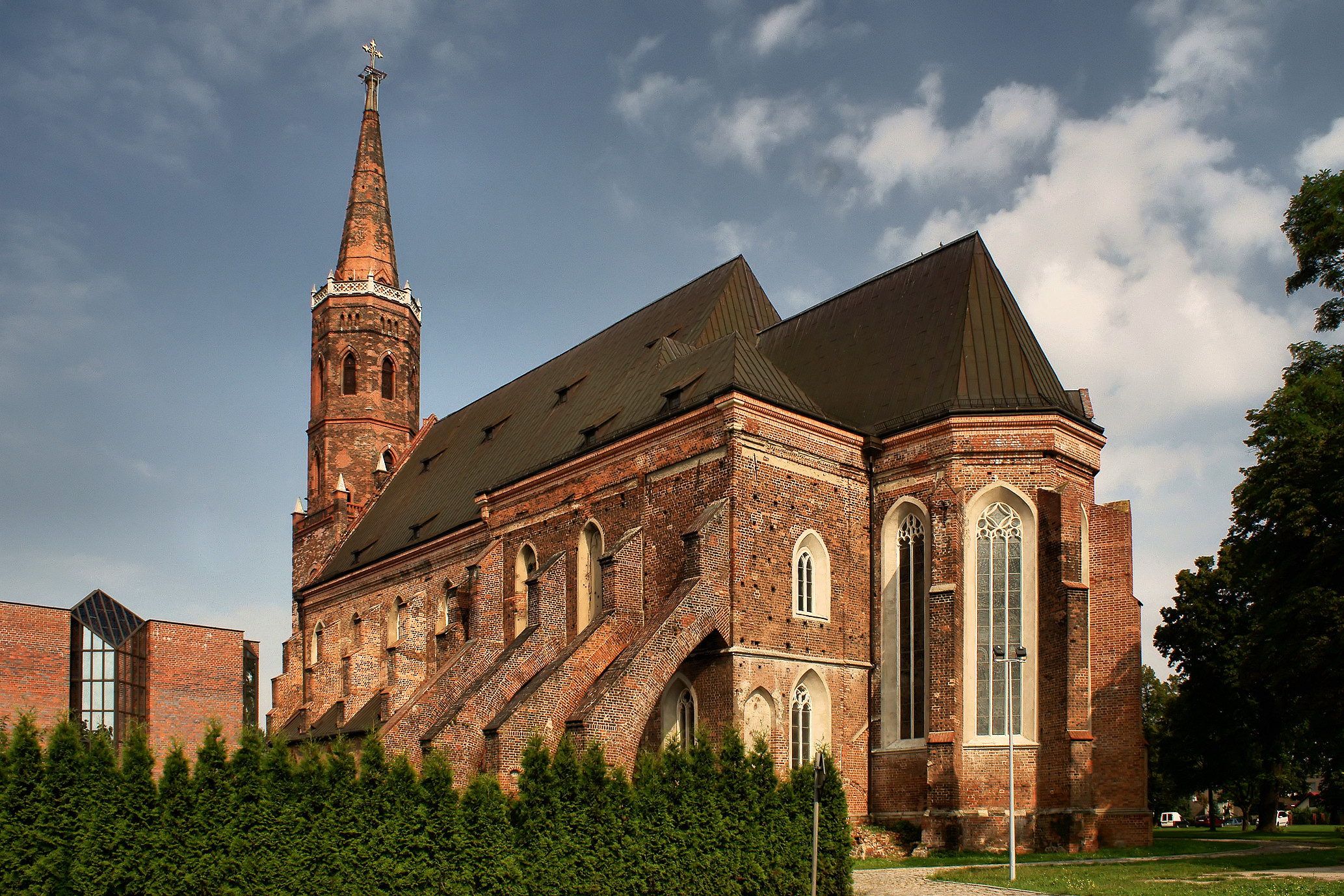

- 51°40′14″N 16°05′38″E
- Location: Głogów
- Country: Poland
- Language: Polish
- Denomination: Catholic

History
- Status: Collegiate church
- Founded: 11th century
- Dedication: Assumption of Mary

Architecture
- Functional status: Active
- Heritage designation: Cultural heritage site
- Designated: 25 November 1949
- Style: Romanesque, Gothic

Administration
- Diocese: Zielona Góra-Gorzów
- Parish: Assumption of Mary Parish in Głogów

The Collegiate Church of the Assumption of the Blessed Virgin Mary in Głogów is a Roman Catholic church located in the parish of the Assumption of the Blessed Virgin Mary, in Głogów, Poland, within the Diocese of Zielona Góra-Gorzów. It rises above the oldest district of Głogów, Ostrów Tumski. It is currently undergoing reconstruction after damage sustained during World War II. Built in the Romanesque and Gothic styles, it is one of the oldest churches in Silesia and the oldest collegiate church in Silesia. Its origins date back to the first Polish monarchs from the Piast dynasty.

== History ==
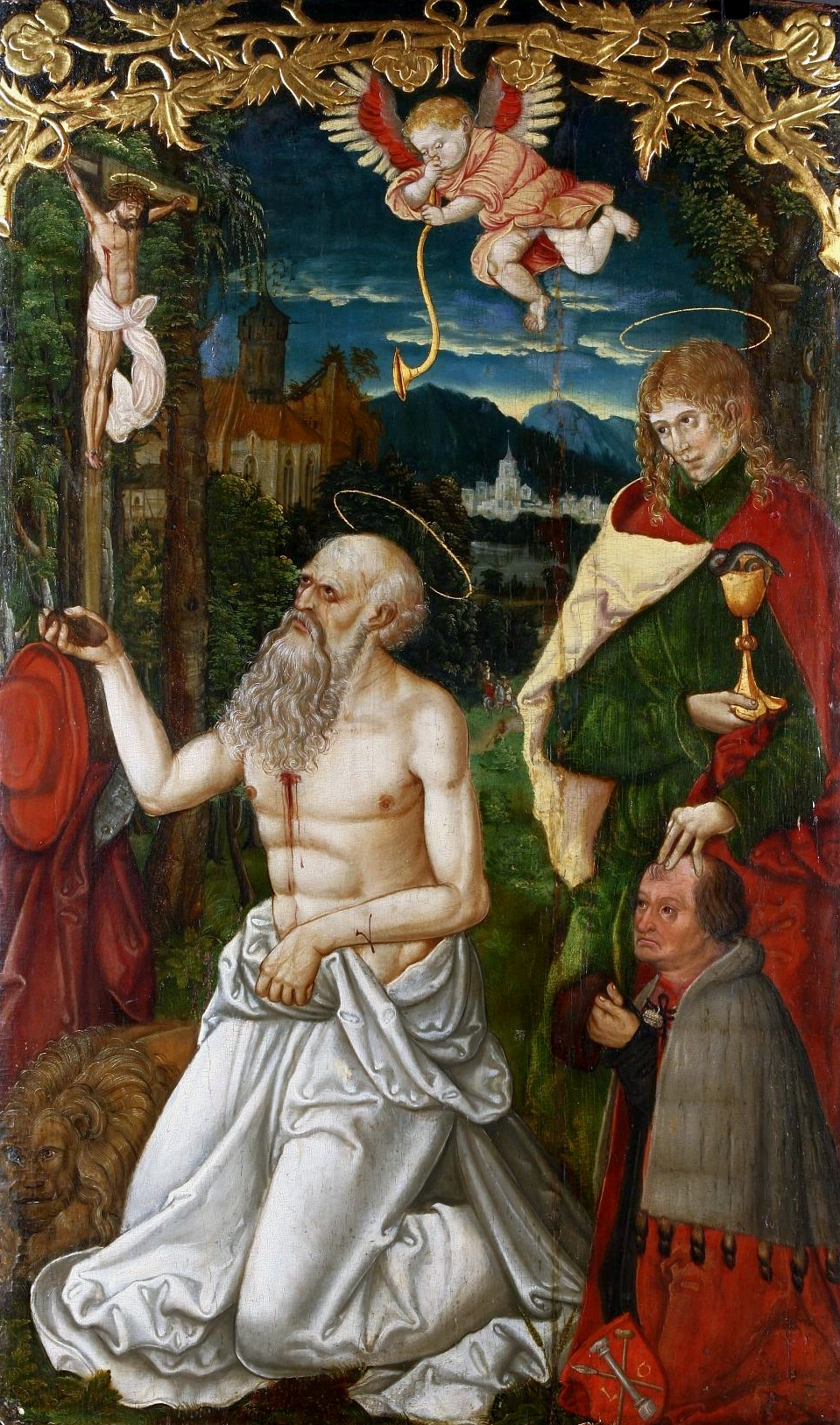
Saint Jerome, by Lucas Cranach the Elder (1508)

Archaeological research carried out in the 1960s under the supervision of Professor Tadeusz Kozaczewski uncovered the remains of two one-nave stone temples inside the collegiate church, both of which were built during the reigns of Bolesław II the Generous and Bolesław III Wrymouth.

The church was raised to the rank of a collegiate in 1120 on the occasion of the founding of the chapter of canons in Głogów by Prince Wojsław. Among its members was John of Głogów, an astronomer, theologian and philosopher, Nicolaus Copernicus' teacher. By 1262 a late-Romanesque basilica with three naves had been built. Its remains are visible in the church walls to this day (e.g. the semi-columns of the arch, windows and other elements in the chancel). The church is one of the burial sites of Dukes from the Głogów line of the Piast dynasty, including Konrad I and Przemko II.

Between 1413 and 1466 the church was thoroughly rebuilt into a form that has survived with minor changes until today. A Gothic three-nave hall with a number of chapels was erected at that time. In the 18th century the interior was given a Baroque look. The 75-metre (246 ft) high neo-Gothic tower was built from 1838 to 1842, after the collapse of the previous one. Its top is decorated with a 5-metre (16 ft) high gilded cross.

There is a specially built crypt inside the Collegiate Church where visitors can admire the relics of the Romanesque temple from the 12th century, which may date back to the defense of Głogów in 1109.

=== Old Master painting ===
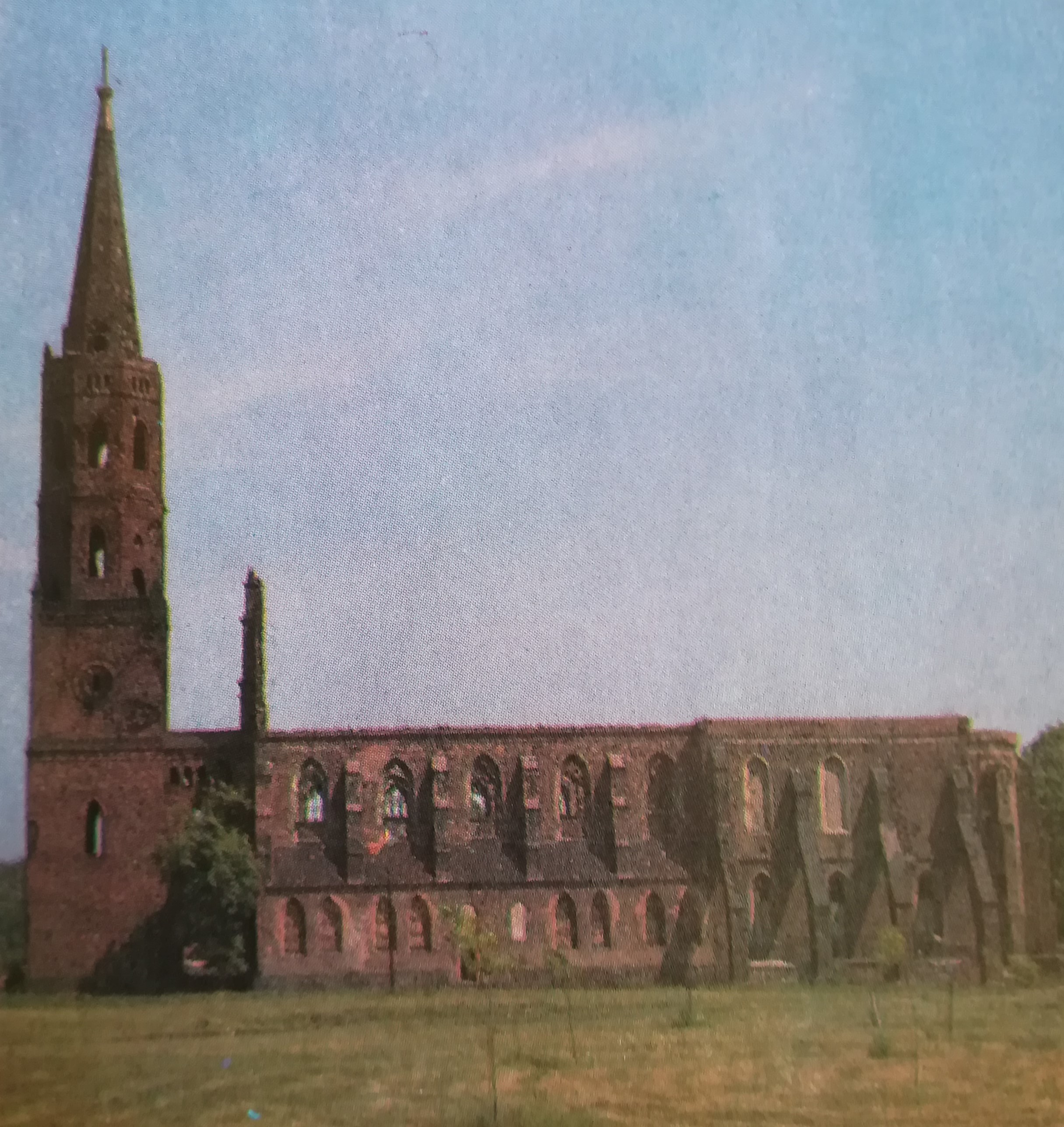
The Church in 1980, prior to restoration

As a result of the destruction of the collegiate church during World War II, the old master painting by Lucas Cranach the Elder from 1518 depicting Mary with the Christ Child, the so-called Madonna of Głogów, was taken away from Głogów in 1943 to Wrocław, then to Henryków and Lądek-Zdrój, where it was deposited in 1945 by a Russian Major named Mosiev. The painting was considered missing for the next few years. Finally, in 2003 it was discovered that the masterpiece is in the possession of the Pushkin Museum in Moscow.

== Reconstruction ==
The reconstruction of the collegiate began in 1988 on the initiative of prelate Ryszard Dobrolowicz, parish priest of the Blessed Virgin Mary Queen of Poland parish in the Kopernik housing estate. In the initial period the construction work was carried out mainly using the priest's own funds, followed by various grants and contributions, e.g. from the Foundation for Polish-German Cooperation. The first Holy Mass since the Second World War was celebrated on the last Sunday of May 1999. The bronze door to the collegiate in Głogów was made by Czesław Dźwigaj.

== Renovation ==
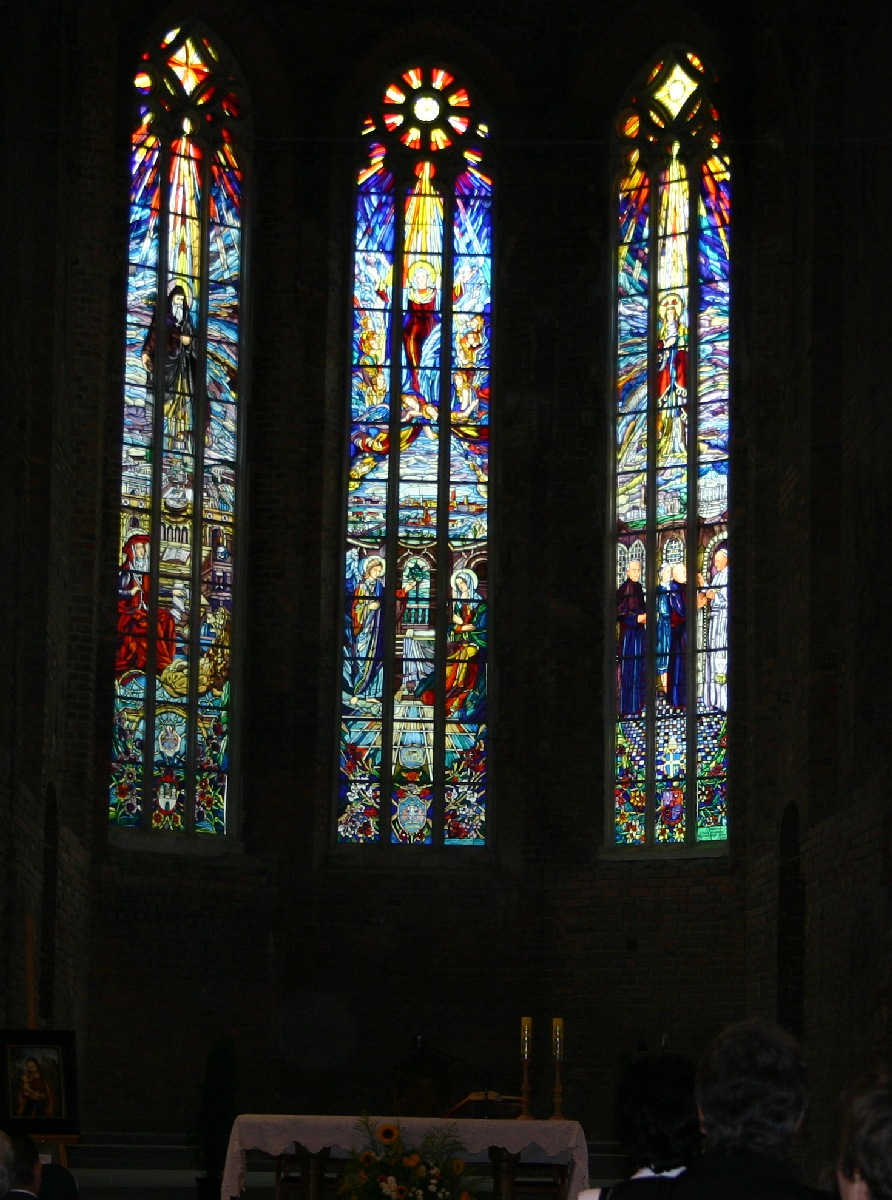
Stained glass windows

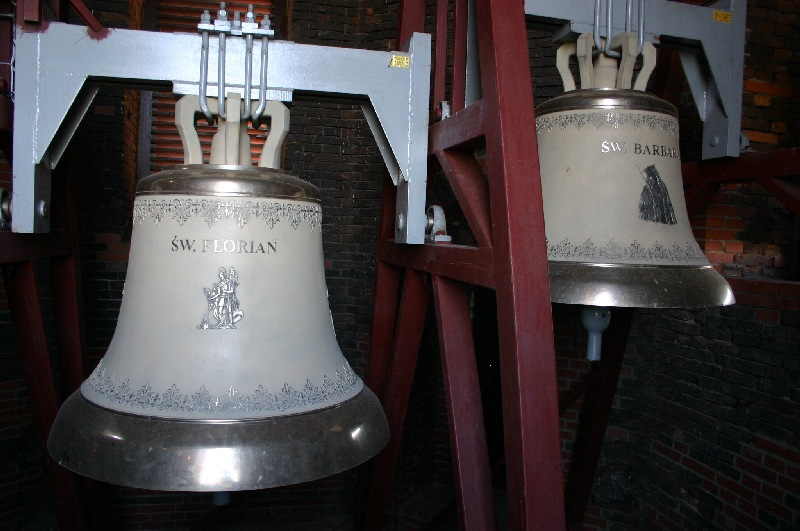
Bells in the Collegiate

The restoration is still in progress, so far a number of renovation works have been carried out, including the repair of the walls of the chancel, as well as the arrangement of the interior with stylized pillars, a floor that refers to the original. Additionally the Romanesque crypt was made into an archaeological repository, the frescos in the side chapels and the vault are currently being restored.

Stained glass windows designed by Czesław Dźwigaj were installed. There are three stained glass windows in the presbytery:

- The left one shows two images of St. Hieronymus
- The middle one depicts the Annunciation and the Assumption of the Blessed Virgin Mary
- The right one depicts the founders of the Silent Workers of the Cross

To the left of the presbytery, in the Chapel of Mary, the stained glass windows depict images of the Mother of God from Polish sanctuaries, with Bishop Wilhelm Pluta on the eastern wall. The remaining windows are dominated by images of saints.

On July 1, 2006, three new bells echoed for the first time. Florian, Barbara and Sophia played the specially composed musical interval Te Deum. They were installed at the height of fifty meters, at the point where the square-shaped part of the Collegiate Tower ends. The bells weigh approximately: Florian: 1,500 kg (3,300 lb), Barbara: 1,000 kg (2,200 lb), Sophia: 750 kg (1,650 lb). Each bell strikes a different tone: the largest ES' the medium one F' and the smallest G'.

On 27 September 2020, on the occasion of the 900-year celebration of the Collegiate Chapter, Bishop Tadeusz Lityński restored the Collegiate Chapter in Głogów.

== The Way of St. James ==
Two stages of the pilgrimage route to the grave of St James in Santiago de Compostela in Spain – the Wielkopolska and Dolnośląska – are connected at the Collegiate Church.

The Centre for the Pastoral Care of the Sick is located next to the Collegiate. It is looked after by the Silent Workers of the Cross.
