= Andreas Gryphius Theatre in Głogów =

Cultural center in Głogów, Poland

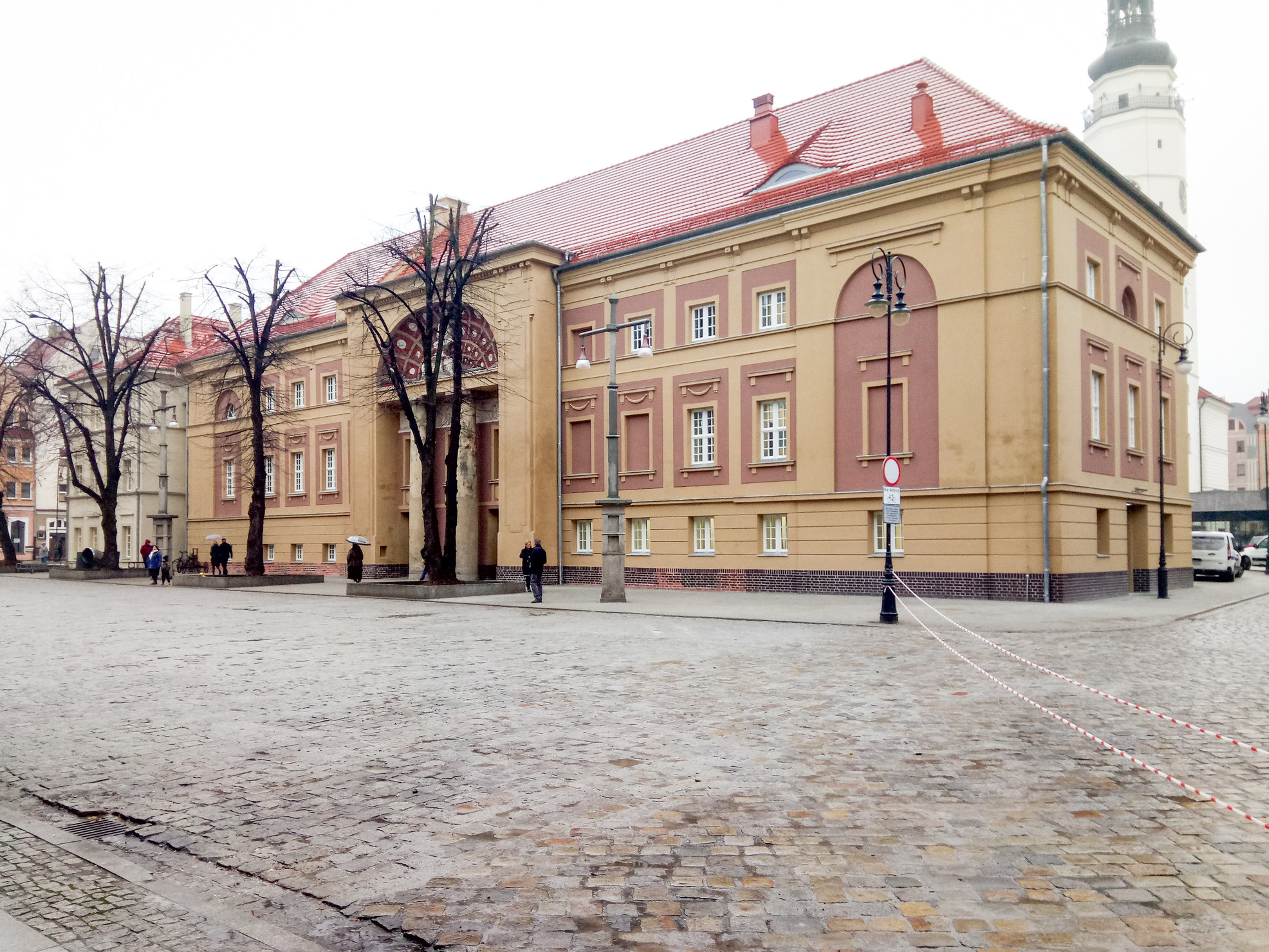
- Theater - view from the east, 2019.
- Interactive map of Andreas Gryphius Theatre in Głogów
- Location: Głogów
- Coordinates: 51°39′49″N 16°05′38″E
- Type: Theater
- Event: Destroyed in 1945, reconstructed 2017-2019.

Website
- Official website

The Andreas Gryphius Theatre in Głogów - a classical theater building located in Głogów, in the central part of the Old Town, next to the town hall. It was built in 1799 according to the design by Christian Valentin Schultze as the seat of a multi-department theater, offering several stage genres at once. The theater operated in the building almost until the end of World War II, when the edifice, along with the entire town, was destroyed as a result of the Soviet offensive on Głogów. In the following decades, different concepts of rebuilding the Głogów theater were proposed, but none of them was implemented. Eventually, the building was rebuilt to its pre-destruction condition in 2017–2019 to house a branch of the Municipal Cultural Center and at the same time host concerts and performances, as well as conferences.

== History ==
=== Construction and operation ===
In the second half of the 18th century, the idea of building separate rooms for theatrical performances grew in Silesian cities. At the end of that century, many cities established associations promoting theatrical culture, the so-called Theaterbetrieb, which inspired the construction or adaptation of rooms for theatrical performances and concerts. The directors of travelling theater troupes also strove to abandon touring in favour of staging their performances during the main season, if possible, in one location.

At that time, Glogau did not have suitable premises for theatrical performances. The performances were usually held in the redoubt room of the building erected between 1774 and 1775 on the site of demolished town benches. However, the redoubt room had modest possibilities of accommodation. At the beginning of 1798, Johann Faller, a theater director, came to Glogau from Jawor (Jauer) with the intention of obtaining a special concession for performances. He also made efforts to establish a permanent stage in the town. The redoubt chamber was too small for that purpose and the considered reconstruction of the town salt storehouse was too expensive. At the end of November 1798, the head of the building department at the Głogów War and Dominion Office, Christian Valentin Schultze, came up with his own proposal. The proposal envisaged building a new floor over the redoubt hall and using it as a separate room for theater purposes. Schultze argued that in view of the danger of the collapse of the roof trusses there, remedial measures would have to be taken soon anyway, so the project would be financially beneficial. In a letter dated January 11, 1799, Schultze presented the project and cost estimate for the construction. His estimate included the addition of a low floor, construction of new chimneys, supporting the western façade with buttresses and the eastern one with a massive risalit. He also proposed a new architectural design of the facades in the Classicist style based on architectural models from Potsdam and Berlin. He estimated the cost of the works at 2,000 thalers. Schultze's plans found support in the War and Dominion Office, which on February 2, 1799, reported immediate readiness to provide construction workers. The work, which was directed by Schultze himself, began in April 1799[7]. As early as December the reconstruction was completed. It was carried out in its entirety, although it exceeded the planned costs quite considerably.

In the early 19th century Glogau was the second Silesian town, after Wrocław (Breslau), to have its own theater. Performances were usually held only in winter seasons. It was a multi-division theater, offering several stage genres simultaneously. From the beginning of its operation until 1933, the theater had a permanent opera and theater ensemble, and from the 1820s, foreign theater and opera troupes also performed there. Beginning in 1870, the opera and operetta ensembles in particular gained in importance. The Głogów theater also staged ballets. Moreover, world-class artists performed on stage. The pianist and composer Ferenc Liszt gave a concert there in March 1843. The first floor of the building was used for meat trading.

The original theater room of the Glogau complex was small, tight, and stifling. In 1839, the ceiling between the upstairs rooms and the theater room above was removed, in addition to building a loggia and an amphitheater with a curtain. This resulted in the creation of a large auditorium, thus the building was named as the city theater. In 1859, the staircase from the inside of the building was moved to the outside.

In the early 1860s, poet Karl Eduard von Holtei suggested erecting a monument to Andreas Gryphius in Glogau. In 1861, he gave a lecture on the humorous peasant game Die geliebte Dornrose (English: "The Beloved Thorn of the Rose"), the income from which formed the basis of the fund to build the monument. Two years later, a committee made of the Głogów magistrate and the scientific community decided to erect a bust of Gryphius and to place it over the main entrance to the town's theater. On 16 July 1864, the anniversary of Andreas Gryphius's death, a ceremony was held to unveil his bust, made by the sculptor Michaelis from Breslau.

In 1867, gas lighting was installed in the theater (it had previously relied on kerosene lighting). In the years 1926–1928, a thorough reconstruction of the building was carried out, which involved demolition of the external staircase and in place of the loggia, a reinforced concrete balcony was built along with a revolving stage. Following the reconstruction, the theater's auditorium had 453 seats.

=== Destruction, reconstruction plans and reconstruction ===
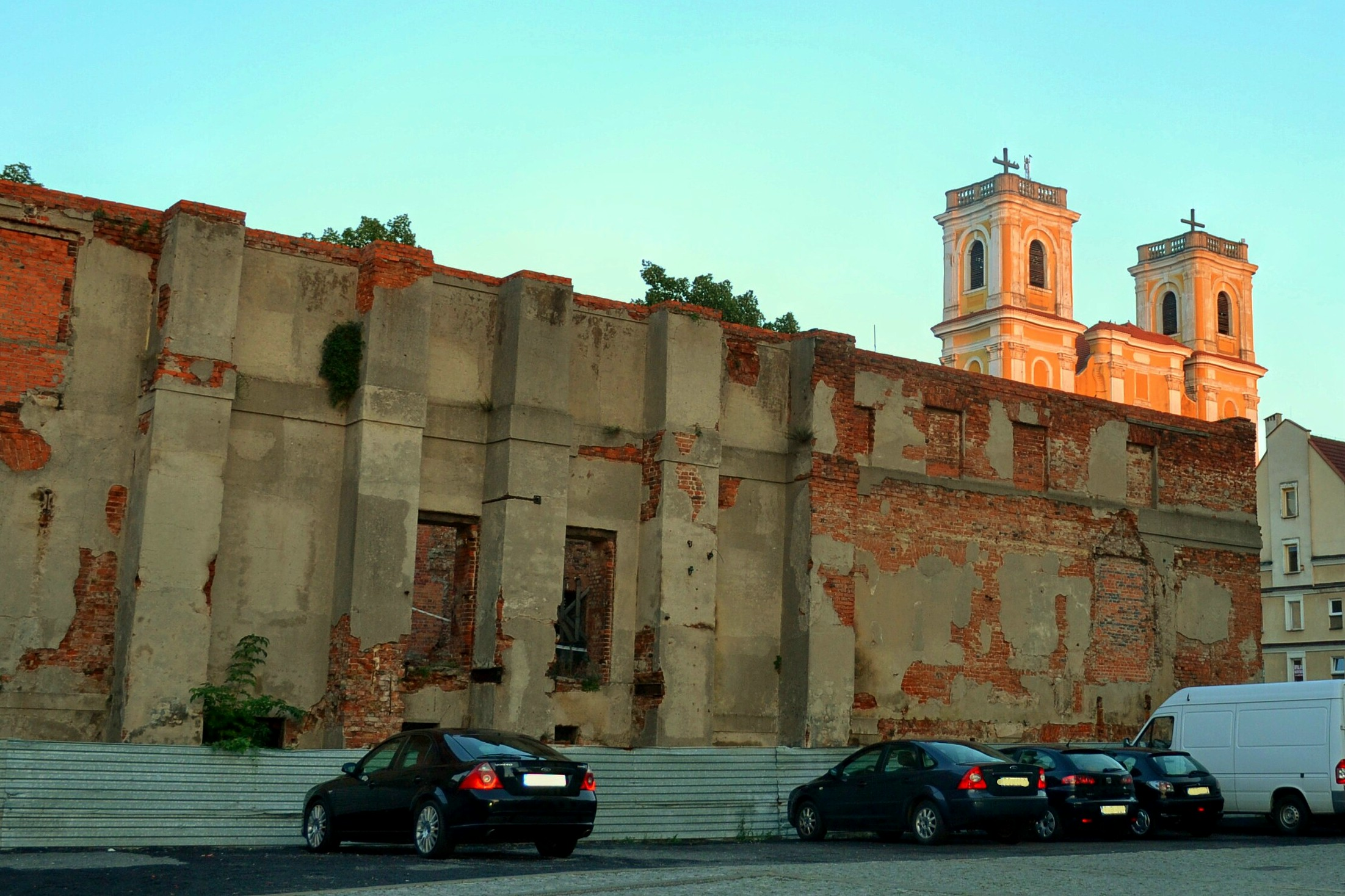
The western façade of the theater in disrepair, 2012

The theater in Głogów functioned continuously almost until the end of World War II, with the last performance taking place in December 1944. A few weeks later, as a result of the Soviet offensive on Głogów, the building, together with the entire town, was destroyed.

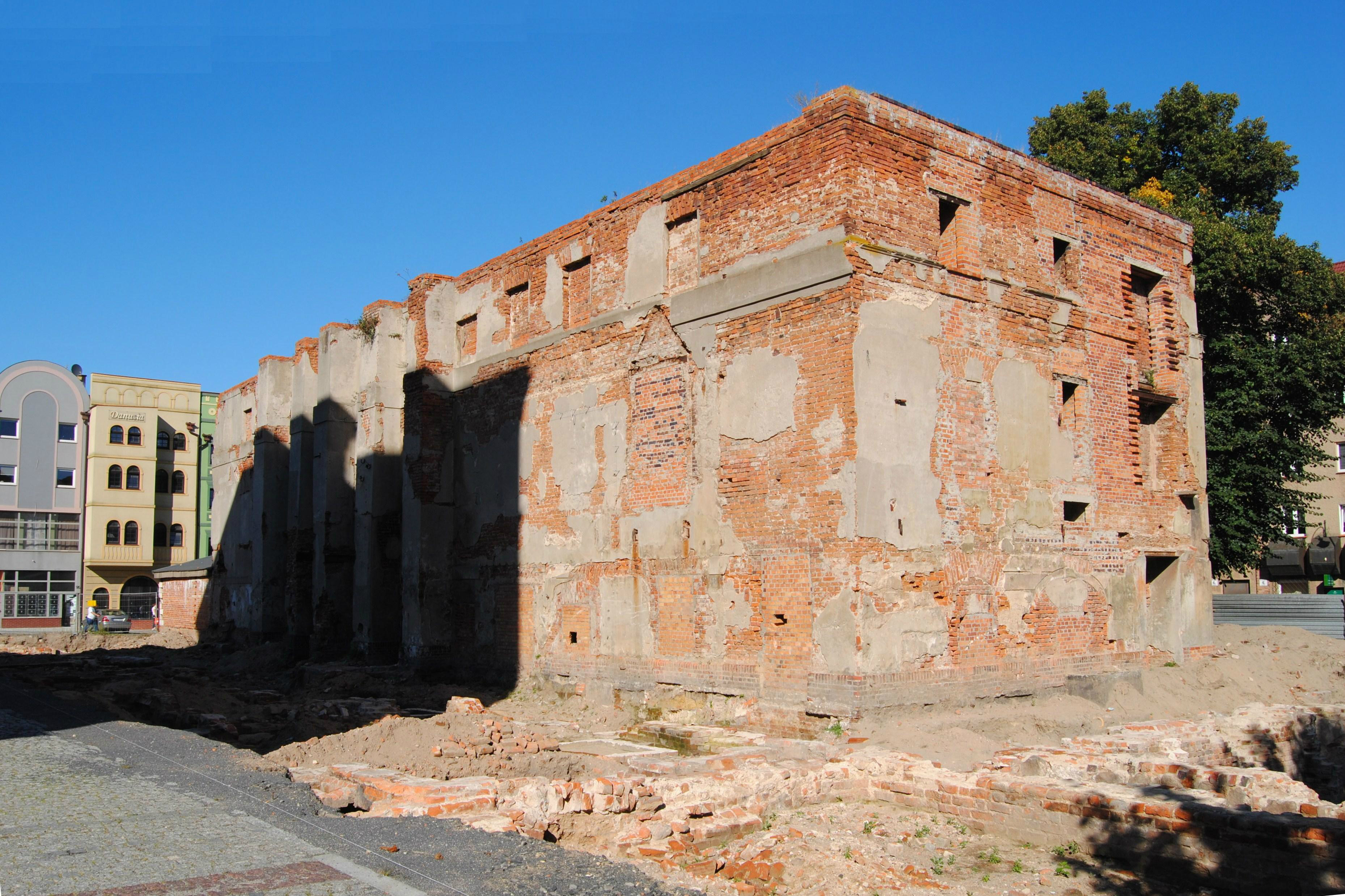
Theater ruins – view from the west, 2016

The first concept of rebuilding the object appeared in 1959 and envisaged a cinema with about 300 seats, as well as a stage for theatrical performances. The investment was planned to be completed three years later, but ultimately it was not carried out - instead, the building was cleared of rubble, and its ground-floor rooms were used as garages to store the demolition company's equipment. In 1976, an idea was put forward to rebuild the theater and the neighboring town hall, and to connect the two buildings with a glass passageway. The building was to become the seat of a cultural institution called the "House of a Young Miner". However, the project was not implemented due to high costs, estimated at nearly 170 million zlotys. Another idea to rebuild the theater in Głogów emerged in 1988[6]. The reconstructed building was to include: "Dom Hutnika" ("Steelworkers' House"), a theater room, the seat of the Chief Technical Organization, a bookstore and a cafeteria, but again, the plans proved unsuccessful.

The topic of rebuilding the theater returned in 1991, when the city council established the Andreas Gryphius Theater Reconstruction Foundation. In 1994, the foundation announced a contest for the reconstruction project, which was won by the Architecture - Sculpture - Stucco Conservation Workshop from Wrocław. The winning project was never implemented, and since then only conservation work has been sporadically carried out on the building. In the year when the contest was announced, the Lubuskie Theatre from Zielona Góra staged Antigone at the entrance to the building. Historical re-enactments of the 1945 battle for Głogów were also staged in the vicinity of the theater.

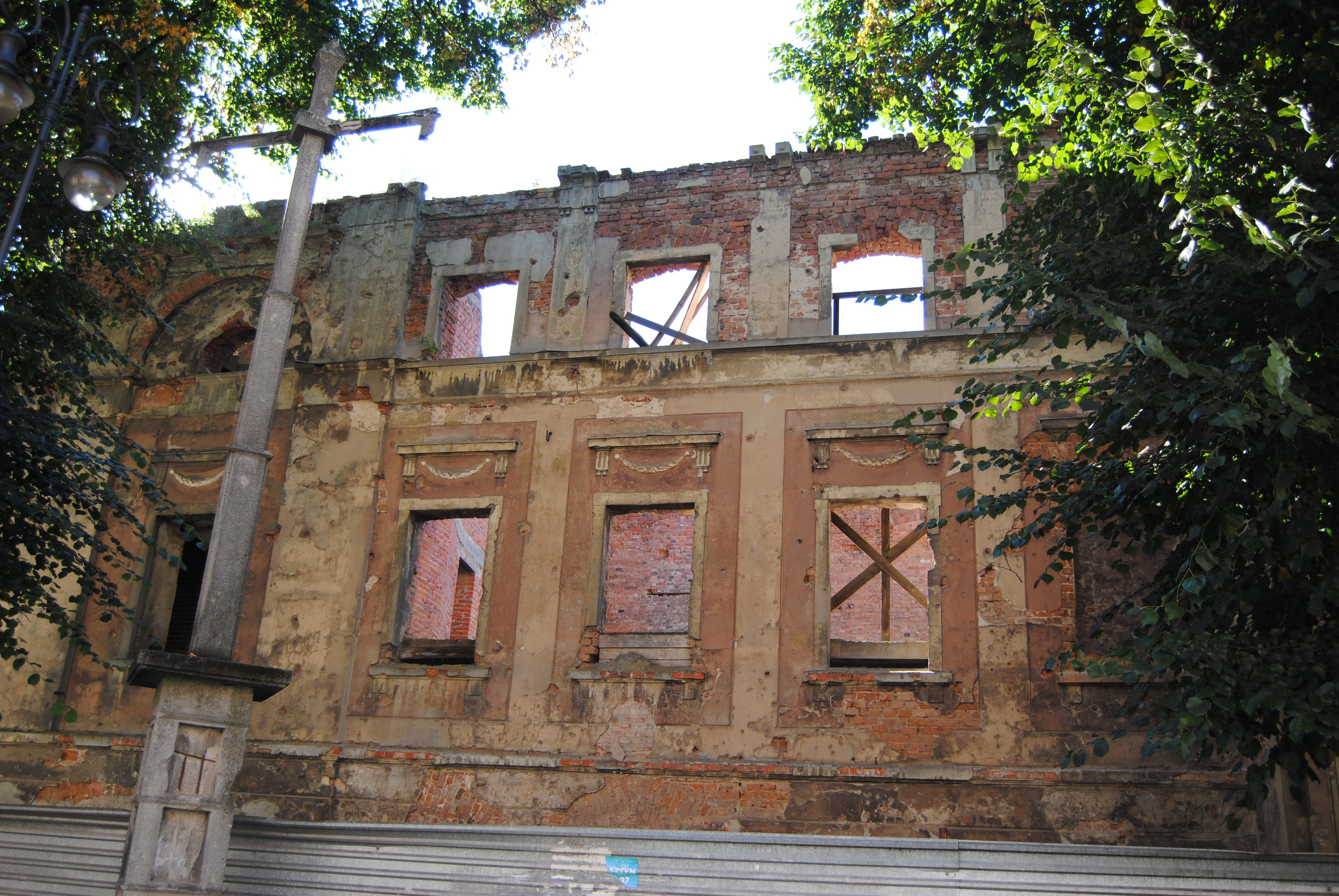
The eastern elevation, 2016

On the occasion of the 200th anniversary of the opening of the Głogów theater in 1999, several significant events took place in the town, including a session of the town council dedicated to the history of theater performances in Silesia. Moreover, the Głogów Land Society published a book about the history of the theater.

In 2014, the city authorities announced a contest for the preparation of "architectural and urban planning concepts for the reconstruction and extension of the former Municipal Theatre for the needs of a music school in Głogów together with the development of the Market Square in the Old Town in Głogów". Within the deadline required by the terms of the competition, the contracting entity received 17 projects, most of which envisaged the reconstruction of the external structures of the theater building and the construction of a modernist building connected to it in the immediate vicinity. According to the results of the contest announced on September 5, 2014, the jury singled out five submitted works, and the authors of four of them were additionally awarded cash prizes (two amounting to PLN 20,000 each and the other two amounting to PLN 5,000 each). Over the following years, none of the awarded projects were implemented.

The authorities of Głogów finally prepared their own project, which included rebuilding the Andreas Gryphius theater to its pre-World War II condition for use as a branch of the Municipal Cultural Centre, where concerts and performances, as well as conferences, were to be held. On 14 July 2017, the Mayor of Głogów Rafael Rokaszewicz signed a contract for the reconstruction of the theater and the tenement house belonging to it with the president of the company "Pre-Fabrykat" from Karpacz, Stanisław Tomkiewicz, and by the end of the month construction work on the building began. The town budget allocated 15 million zlotys for the reconstruction, additionally, the municipality received 5 million zlotys from EU funds. During the construction works, the preserved original elements and architectural details were restored and conserved. Moreover, the non-existing elements and plasterwork on the eastern, southern and northern elevations were reconstructed including the original color.

On 9 September 2019, a copy of the bust of Andreas Gryphius (the original survived World War II, but disappeared in 1959 under unexplained circumstances) was placed over the entrance of the rebuilt theater building with the help of a crane. The cost of making the copy, including its installation, was 50,000 zloty. On 21 November 2019, between 12 and 5 p.m., the rebuilt theater was opened to the public (4.7 thousand people visited it at the time), and on 22 November an opening ceremony was held, which was preceded by a performance of the premiere play Piast, based on the text by the theater's patron Andreas Gryphius, directed by Robert Czechowski, with Jan Peszek in the lead role and the participation of actors from the Lubuski Theater and the amateur Głogów One Bridge Theater. According to preliminary calculations made by the local authorities at that time, the annual cost of maintaining the building was to be around 900 thousand zloty, and the annual subsidy for the facility's manager, the Municipal Cultural Centre, was to be around 600 thousand zloty.

== Architecture ==
The Andreas Gryphius Theatre is a building with a rectangular plan measuring 50 x 12.5 m. Its façades are in classical style. The eastern front façade is multicolored and zoned: the base is red, while the storeys are grayish-yellow and brown. Its strong accent is the central risalit with a surface organized by a large niche with a conch vault, the palate of which has carmine coffered decoration with gilded rosettes. Two Doric columns carrying a beam are located inside the niche. A bust of Andreas Gryphius, weighing 400 kg, is set on the beam with the inscription Gryphius 1616-1664 in gold letters underneath. Below the beam, in the niche's surface, a 5-metre wide strip of a figure frieze with images of ancient allegoric scenes, celebrating the joy of different kinds of art, is located. In the axis of the central risalit on the western elevation, there are buttresses strengthening the elevation's structure.
