= Leopold Friedrich Raab =

German composer and violinist

Leopold Friedrich Raab (1721 - after 1786) was a German composer and violinist of the baroque to early classical era.

Raab was born in Glogau (now Głogów, Poland). He studied for several years at the leopoldinum (later to become the University of Wrocław). He also took part in performances at the catholic church there. He studied violin with a violinist named Rau before moving to Berlin to study with Franz Benda. He also began composing numerous concertos, sonatas and sinfonias in the style of his master. His name appears as a dedication on the autograph manuscript of a quartet by Johann Gottlieb Janitsch dated 1750, Potsdam alongside Johann Caspar Grundke, an oboist of Frederick the Great's Hofkapelle. This indicates that he took part in performances at the Royal Court, or possibly at Janitsch's weekly house concerts "Freitags-Akademien".) In this particular quartet, Raab must have played either viola or violetta.

In 1753 he was employed as Konzertmeister at the Hofkapelle of Karl Friedrich Albrecht, Margrave of Brandenburg-Schwedt in Berlin. After the death of the Margrave in 1762, he acquired the position of chamber musician and director of music at the court of Prince Augustus Ferdinand of Prussia. In 1784, he was recorded as living in Mauerstraße.

His date of death is unknown.

His son, Ernst Heinrich Otto (1750-1801), having learnt the violin from his father, also became a distinguished violinist and was appointed as a chamber musician to the emperor of Russia.

== Works ==
Raab was said to have composed numerous concertos, sonatas and sinfonias during his time in Berlin, as well as many good "things" for the violin, however it seems that most of his music has not survived, or remains undiscovered. His only known works to have survived are two violin concertos (in E major and E minor) for which the manuscripts can be found in the archive of the Sing-Akademie zu Berlin which was rediscovered in 2000.
