= Czesław Litwin =

Polish politician (1955–2024)

Member of Sejm 2005–2007
- In office 25 September 2005 – 2007

Personal details
- Born: 17 March 1955 Głogów, Poland
- Died: 27 September 2024 (aged 69)
- Party: Samoobrona

Czesław Litwin (17 March 1955 – 27 September 2024) was a Polish politician. He was elected to Sejm on 25 September 2005, getting 9902 votes in 1 Legnica district as a candidate from Samoobrona Rzeczpospolitej Polskiej list. Litwin died on 27 September 2024, at the age of 69.

== See also ==
- Members of Polish Sejm from 2005 to 2007
