= Georg Gustav Fülleborn =

German philosopher, philologist and miscellaneous writer

Georg Gustav Fülleborn (2 March 1769 – 6 February 1803) was a German philosopher, philologist and miscellaneous writer.

== Biography ==
Fülleborn was born at Glogau, Silesia. He studied theology at the University of Halle, where he was introduced to classical philology by Friedrich August Wolf. He received his Doctor of Philosophy in recognition of the thesis "De Xenophane, Zenone et Gorgia". He took diaconal orders in 1791, but almost immediately became a professor of classical languages at the Elisabeth-Gymnasium in Breslau. He died from a heart attack at the age of 33 in Breslau.

His philosophical works include annotations to Christian Garve's translation of the "Politics" of Aristotle (1799–1800), and a large share of the "Beiträge zur Geschichte der Philosophie" (published in twelve parts between 1791 and 1799), in which he collaborated with Friedrich Karl Forberg, Karl Leonhard Reinhold, Friedrich August Carus and Friedrich Immanuel Niethammer.

In philology he wrote:

- Encyclopaedia philologica sive primae lineae Isagoges in antiquorum studia (1798; 2nd edition, 1805)
- Kurze Theorie des lateinischen Stils (1793).
- Leitfaden der Rhetorik (1802).
- Persius, Satires (annotated), editor.

Under the pseudonym "Edelwald Justus" he published several collections of popular tales:

- Bunte Blätter (1795).
- Kleine Schriften zur Unterhaltung (1798).
- Nebenstunden (1799).

After his death were published:

- Taschenbuch für Brunnengäste (1806).
- Kanzelreden (1807).

He was a frequent contributor to the press, where his writings were very popular.
