= Andreas Gryphius =

German poet and dramatist

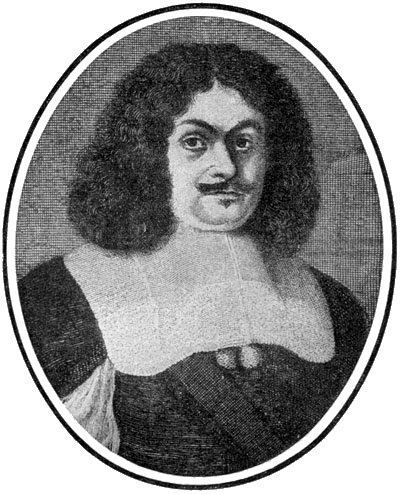
- Engraving by Philipp Kilian
- Born: Andreas Greif; 2 October 1616; Glogau (Głogów), Silesia
- Died: 16 July 1664 (aged 47); Glogau, Silesia
- Education: Academic Gymnasium Danzig
- Occupations: Dramatist; playwright; poet; actor
- Era: Baroque-era Germany
- Movement: German Baroque
- Spouse: Rosina Deutschländer (m. 1649)
- Children: Christian; Constantin; Anna Rosine; Theodor; Maria Elisabeth; Daniel
- Parents: Paul Greif (father); Anna Erhardin (mother)

Signature
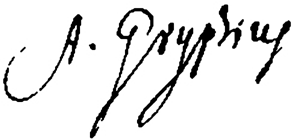

Andreas Gryphius (German: Andreas Greif; 2 October 1616 – 16 July 1664) was a German poet and playwright. With his eloquent sonnets, which contains "The Suffering, Frailty of Life and the World", he is considered one of the most important Baroque poets of the Germanosphere. He was one of the first improvers of the German language and German poetry.

Gryphius was born and raised in Glogau (Głogów), Duchy of Głogów, Silesia. At the age of 33, he married Rosina Deutschländer, with whom he had six children, Christian, Constantin, Anna Rosine, Theodor, Maria Elisabeth, and Daniel.

== Life ==
=== Early life ===
Andreas Gryphius was the son of Paullus Gryphius, a respected clergyman and a Lutheran archdeacon of Glogau, originally from Uthleben and Paullus' third wife, Anna (née Eberhardin), who was 32 years younger than her husband, the daughter of a businessman from Wschowa, Poland, the councilor Jonas Deutschländer the Elder (died in 1661) and Anna Sachse. He was born in Großglogau (Głogów). The family name was originally "Greif" and had been Latinised to "Gryphius" by Andreas' paternal great-grandfather (Peter Greif von Heringen). Left early an orphan and driven from his native town by the troubles of the Thirty Years' War, he received his schooling in various places, but notably at Wschowa, where he enjoyed an excellent classical education.

== Career in poetry ==
In 1634 he went to Danzig (Polish: Gdańsk) where he met professors Peter Crüger and Johann Mochinger at the Danzig Gymnasium, who introduced Gryphius to the new German language poetry. Crüger had for years close contacts to Martin Opitz, who became known as the 'father of German poetry'. Greatly influenced by Crüger, he is the only one Gryphius dedicated poems to. Gryphius wrote Latin language poetry, German poems and sonnets.

The same year that Gryphius arrived, the printer Andreas Hünefeld published Martin Opitz's Buch von der deutschen Poeterey (Book of German Poetry). The same publisher printed Opitz's translation Tetrastichen des Pibrac (Tetrasticha of Pibrac, or four verse) and Antigone. Among Gryphius' benefactors was the city's secretary Michael Borck, who wrote a German version of the life of Jesus Christ. Borck's illustrated book is still at the Gdańsk library. Coming from war riddled Silesia, taking refuge at the big international harbor and a Polish city, greatly stimulated Gryphius. In 1635 he published his second epos of Herodes, Dei Vindicis Impetus et Herodis Interitus. He dedicated this to the city state council.

In 1636, while still in Danzig, he published the Parnassus renovatus in praise of his mentor and patron, the eminent jurist Georg Schönborner (1579–1637). Later the same year Gryphius became the tutor of Schönborner's two sons, on Schönborner's estate near Freystadt, in Silesia (today, Kożuchów, Poland). A highly educated scholar, Schönborner held various government administrative posts and by that time had been honored by Emperor Ferdinand II with the title of Imperial Count Palatine (Hofpfalzgraf). On 30 November 1637, Schönborner recognized Gryphius's poetic talent by bestowing upon him the title of poeta laureatus and master of philosophy, as well as a patent of nobility (of which Gryphius, however, never made use). Schönborner died less than a month later, on 23 December 1637.

While staying with Schönborner, Gryphius completed his first collection of poems, Sonnete ("Sonnets"), which was published in 1637 by Wigand Funck in Leszno, Poland, and is also known as the Lissaer Sonettbuch, after the city. The collection of 31 sonnets includes some of his best known poems, such as "Vanitas vanitatum, et omnia vanitas", later titled "Es ist alles eitel" (All is vanity), about the effects of war and the transitoriness of human life; "Menschliches Elende" (Human misery); and "Trawrklage des verwüsteten Deutschlandes" (Lament of devastated Germany).

In 1632, he had witnessed the pillaging and burning of the Silesian town of Freystadt by Swedish troops, and immortalized the event in his poem Fewrige Freystadt. Also in 1637 he went to continue his studies at Leiden, where he remained for six years, both hearing and delivering lectures. Here he fell under the influence of the great Dutch dramatists, Pieter Corneliszoon Hooft and Joost van den Vondel, who largely determined the character of his later dramatic works.

In 1635 with the Prager Frieden (Peace of Prague), the Habsburgs took control over in Silesia again and persecuted Protestants and closed their churches. In 1638 Paul Gryphius, the brother of Andreas, received a position as Superindendant at Crossen an der Oder (Krosno Odrzańskie) in Brandenburg from the Elector Georg Wilhelm of Brandenburg. Paul was for several years banned from Silesia for of being a Protestant, and Andreas dedicated and sent him several poems for the start of his new position.

== Travel and dramatic work ==
After travelling in France, Italy and southern German states, Gryphius settled in 1647 at Wschowa, where he began his dramatic work, and in 1650 was appointed syndic of Glogau, a post he held until his death. A short time previously he had been admitted under the title of The Immortal into the Fruchtbringende Gesellschaft ("Fruitbearing Society"), a literary society, founded in 1617 by Ludwig, prince of Anhalt-Köthen on the model of the Italian academies.

Gryphius grew up during the Thirty Years' War and witnessed the destruction of large parts of Germany, which had lasting effects for centuries. Not yet an adult himself, he saw the child of a benefactor (Crüger) die, and prepared another (Schönborner) for his approaching death. It is therefore not surprising that some morbid disposition, and his melancholy temperament, fostered by the misfortunes of his childhood is largely reflected in his lyrics, of which the most famous are the Kirchhofsgedanken ("Cemetery thoughts", 1656). His best works are his comedies, one of which, Absurda Comica, oder Herr Peter Squentz (1663), is evidently based on the comic episode of Pyramus and Thisbe in A Midsummer Night's Dream. Die geliebte Dornrose (1660), written in Silesian dialect, contains many touches of natural simplicity and grace, and ranks high among the comparatively small number of German dramas of the 17th century. Horribilicribrifax (1663), founded on the Miles Gloriosus of Plautus, is a rather labored attack on pedantry. Besides these three comedies, Gryphius wrote five tragedies. In all of them the tendency is to become wild and bombastic, but he had the merit of at least attempting to work out artistically conceived plans, and there are occasional flashes both of passion and of imagination. His models seem to have been Seneca and Vondel. In Carolus Stuardus (1657) he dramatised events of his own day, namely the death of King Charles I of England; his other tragedies are Leo Armenius (1650); Katharina von Georgien (1657), Cardenio und Celinde (1657) and Papinianus (1659). No German dramatic writer before him had risen to so high a level, nor had he worthy successors until about the middle of the 18th century.

== Works ==
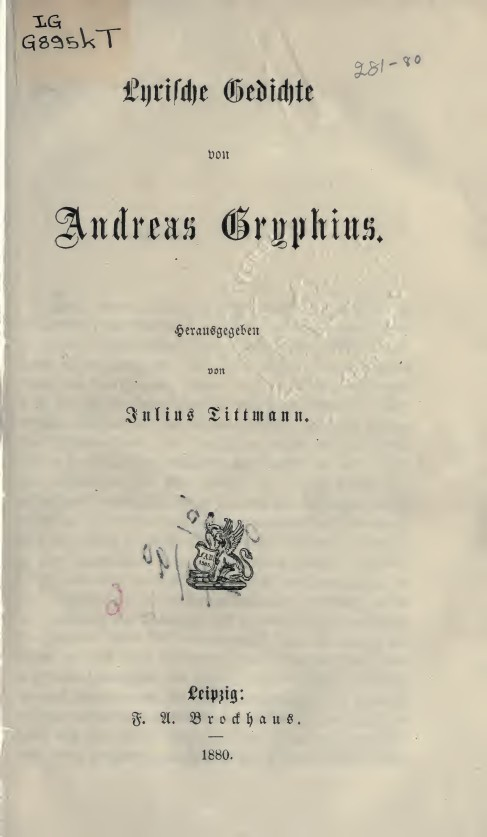
Lyrische Gedichte (1880)

=== Latin ===
- Herodis Furiae et Rachelis lachrymae, Głogów 1634
- Dei Vindicis Impetus et Herodis Interitus, Gdańsk 1635
- Parnassus renovatus, Gdańsk 1636
- Epigrammata liber I, Leiden 1643
- Olivetum Libri three, Florence 1646

=== Lyric ===
- Sonette (Lissaer Sonette), Leszno 1637
- Son- und Feyrtags-Sonette, Leiden 1639
- Sonette Das erste Buch, Leiden 1643
- Oden Das erste Buch, Leiden 1643
- Epigrammata. Das erste Buch, Leiden 1643
- Gedanken über den Kirchhof und Ruhestätte der Verstorbenen, Wrocław 1657

=== Tragedies ===
- Ein Fürsten-Mörderisches Trawer-Spiel / genant. Leo Armenius, Frankfurt am Main 1650
- Katharina von Georgien Oder Bewehrete Beständigkeit. Tragedy, Wrocław 1657
- Cardenio vnd Celinde, Oder Unglücklich Verliebete. Tragedy, Wrocław 1657
- Ermordete Majestät. Oder Carolus Stuardus König von Groß Britannien. Tragedy, Wrocław 1657; Very revised and expanded version: Breslau 1663
- Großmüttiger Rechts-Gelehrter / Oder Sterbender Aemilius Paulus Papinianus. Tragedy, Wrocław 1659

=== Comedies ===
- Absurd Comic oder Herr Peter Squenz / Schimpff-Spiel, Wrocław 1658
- Horribilicribrifax Teutsch, Wrocław 1663
- Verlibtes Gespenste / Gesang-Spil. Die gelibte Dornrose / Schertz-Spil in Silesian dialect (double drama), Wrocław 1660

=== Prose ===
- Fewrige Freystadt, Leszno 1637
- Mumiae Wratislavienses, Wrocław 1662
- Funeral Dissertationes. Oder Leich-Abdanckungen, Leipzig 1667
- A French paperback—A play in five acts, composed in 1659 by the master of the German baroque theater. It shows the failure of the cynicism of Machiavelli's political theories. [see here, can be later used as reference—

=== Drama ===
- Cardenio and Celinde (1647) – tragedy
- Leo Arminius (1650) – historical tragedy
- Carolus Stuardus (1657 – first version; 1663 – second version) – historical tragedy
- Katharina von Georgien (1657) – historical tragedy
- Absurda Comica oder Herr Peter Squenz (1658) – comedy
- Papinianus (1659) – historical tragedy
- The Beloved Rose with a Thorn (1661) – comedy
- Horribilicribrifax (1663) – comedy

== See also ==
- Andreas Gryphius Theatre in Głogów
