= Wróblin Głogowski =

Former village in the Lower Silesian Voivodeship, Poland

- Quarter
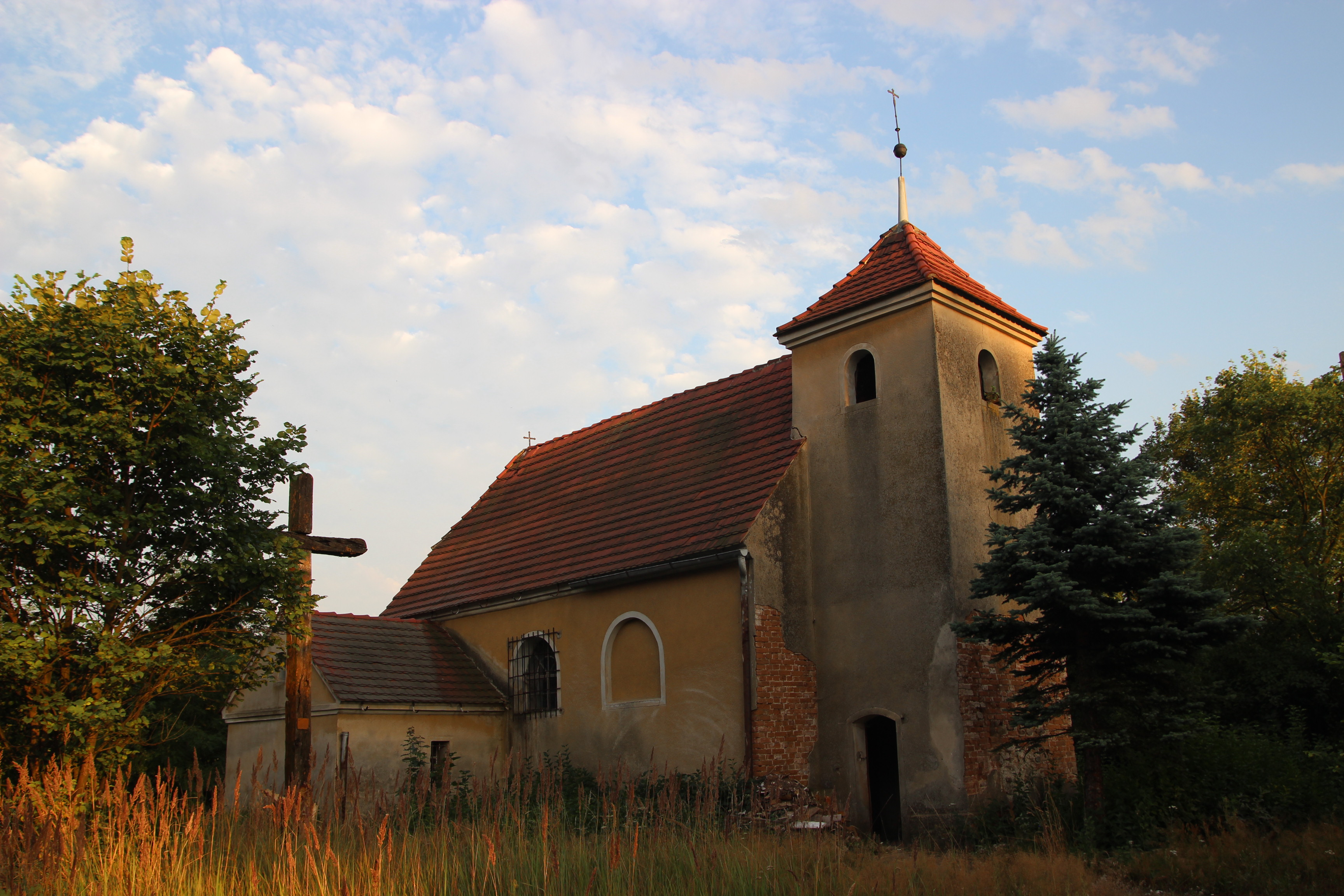

- Location within Poland
- Coordinates: 51°41′58″N 15°57′12″E
- Country: Poland
- Voivodeship: Lower Silesian Voivodeship
- County: Głogów

Wróblin Głogowski (German: Fröbel) is a former village, now almost completely deserted part of Głogów, in Lower Silesian Voivodeship, in Głogów County. Wróblin is located in the direct vicinity of the Głogów Copperworks. Degradation of the natural environment by the smelter forced the inhabitants of the village to leave it. Currently, Wróblin Głogowski is located within the administrative borders of Głogów and is inhabited by one family

== Name ==
The name derives from the Polish name "sparrow", a bird from the sparrow family (Passeridae). According to the German geographer and linguist Heinrich Adamy, the name of the town derives from the Polish name "sparrow". - "von sparrow = Sperling". In his work on local names in Silesia published in 1888 in Wrocław, he mentions the Polish name "Wróblina" as the earliest, giving its meaning "Sperlingdorf", i.e., "Village of Sparrows" in Polish. The Germans Germanized the name to Fröbel and as a result it lost its original meaning.

In 1295, in the Latin chronicle Liber fundationis episcopatus Vratislaviensis (the "Wage Book of the Bishopric of Wroclaw"), the village was mentioned in the form of Wroblino.

== Monuments ==
The register of the National Heritage Institute includes a list of monuments:

- The Chapel of St. Helena's Church, a classicist brick church, built in 1810
- Wooden bell tower

=== Other monuments ===
- The Wróblin Głogowski railroad station
- Monument to German soldiers from Wróblin Głogowski who were killed in World War I
- Near the town, burnt Lusatian burial cemeteries were discovered. The artifacts are currently on display in the Archaeological and History Museum in Głogów Castle.
