= Głogów =

City in Lower Silesian Voivodeship, Poland

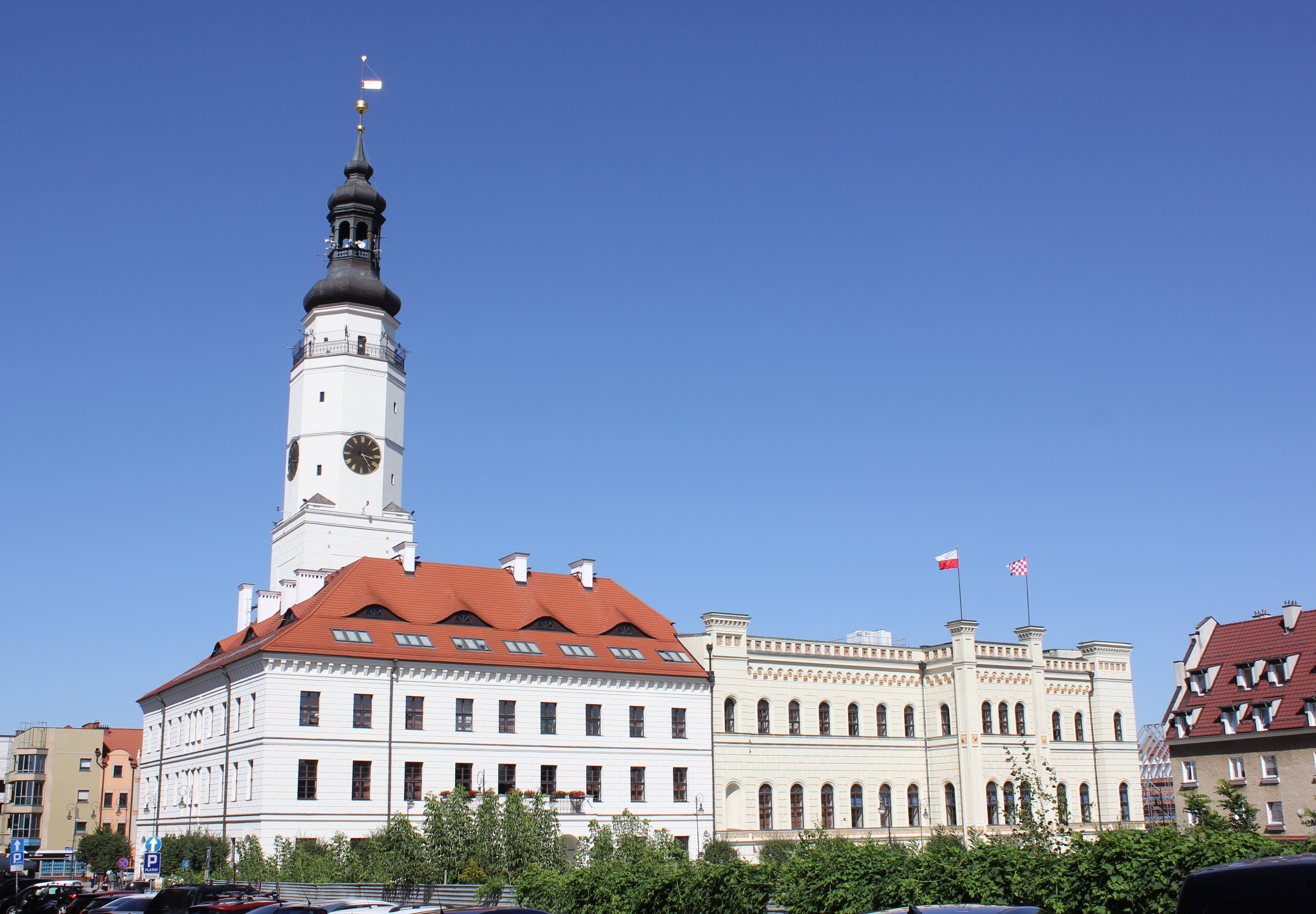
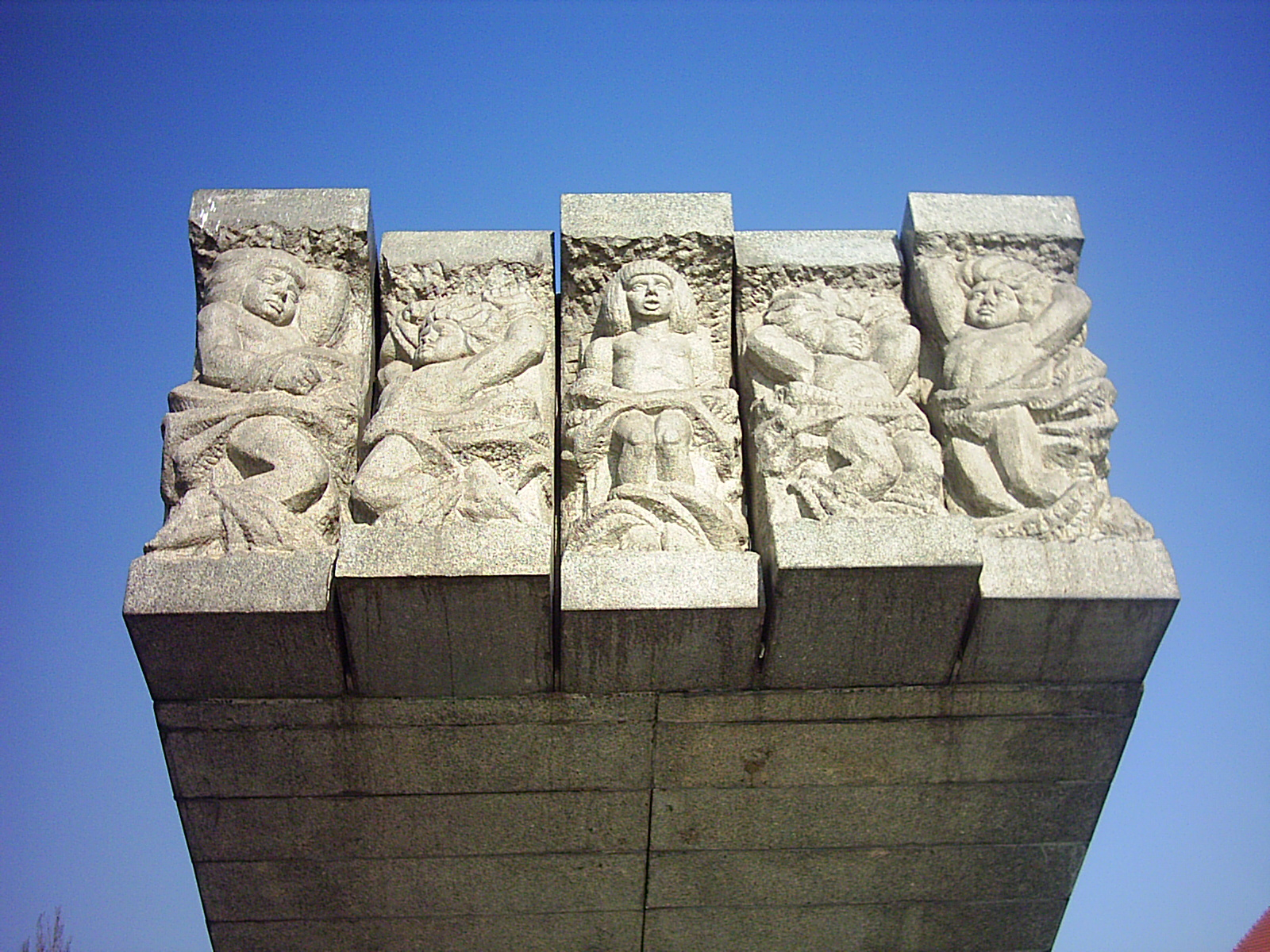
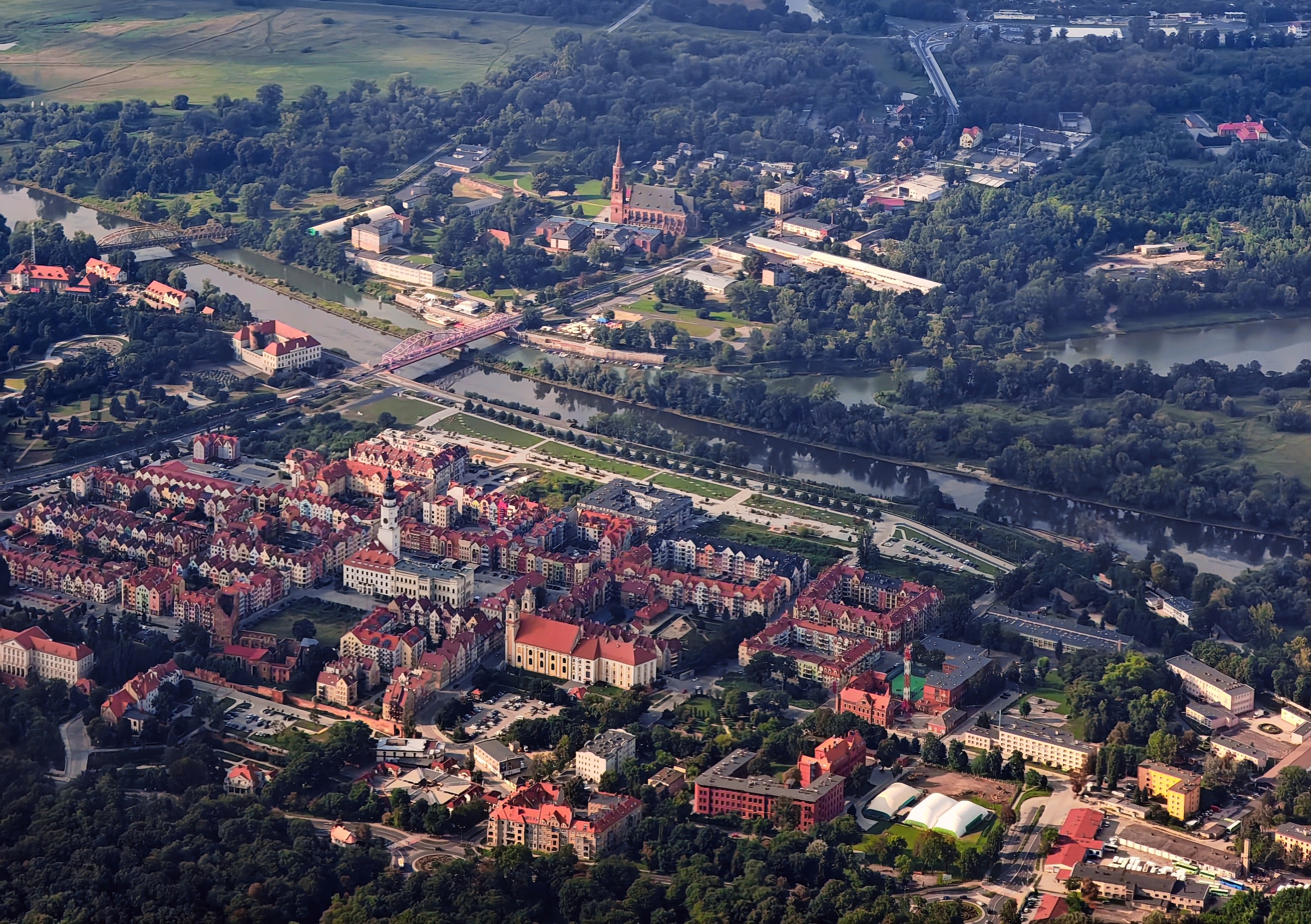
- City hall Children of Głogów Monument Aerial view of the city center

- Flag Coat of arms

- Location within Poland
- Coordinates: 51°39′32″N 16°4′49″E
- Country: Poland
- Voivodeship: Lower Silesian
- County: Głogów
- Gmina: Głogów (urban gmina)
- Established: 10th century
- City rights: 1253

Government
  - City mayor: Rafael Rokaszewicz (L)

Area
  - Total: 35.37 km^{2} (13.66 sq mi)

Population (31 December 2021)
  - Total: 65,400 ▼
  - Density: 1,850/km^{2} (4,790/sq mi)
- Time zone: UTC+1 (CET)
  - Summer (DST): UTC+2 (CEST)
- Postal code: 67-200 to 67-211
- Area code: +48 76
- Vehicle registration: DGL
- Website: http://www.glogow.pl

Głogów (Polish: [ˈɡwɔɡuf]; German: Glogau, rarely Groß-Glogau, Czech: Hlohov) is a city in western Poland. It is the county seat of Głogów County, in Lower Silesian Voivodeship. Głogów is the sixth largest town in the Voivodeship; its population in 2021 was 65,400.

Among the oldest towns in Poland, Głogów was founded in the 10th century as a Piast defensive settlement and obtained city rights in the 13th century from Duke Konrad I. It is known for one of the most important medieval Polish defensive battles against German incursions. Due to the town's strategic location on several trade routes, the townspeople received many privileges and benefits, which brought wealth and greatly reflected on the city's architecture. From 1251 to 1506, it was the capital of a small eponymous duchy ruled by a local line of the Piast dynasty and by future Kings of Poland from the Jagiellonian dynasty. Over time, Głogów grew to be one of the largest fortified towns in Lower Silesia. The demolition of fortifications at the beginning of the 20th century improved the chances for further growth. However, towards the end of the Second World War Głogów was once again turned into a defensive fortress and as such suffered almost complete destruction.

Currently reconstruction works are being carried out with the aim of restoring the historic pre-war appearance of the town. The castle, which was rebuilt between 1971 and 1983, now houses the Historical and Archaeological Museum, displaying artifacts such as Lusatian burial artifacts from Wróblin Głogowski. Since 1984 the town also has been the venue for the Głogów Jazz Festival, which features local and international singers, musicians and performers.

Głogów is one of four cities in the Copper Basin (along with Legnica, Lubin and Polkowice), a copper mining and smelting district, one of the richest regions in Poland. It is located on the main highway connecting the port city of Szczecin with the Czech–Polish border, part of the European route E65.

== Etymology ==
The name of the town derives from głóg, the Polish name for hawthorn.

== History ==
=== Polish rule ===
Głogów is one of the oldest towns in Poland. It was founded as a grad by a West Slavic tribe called the Dziadoszanie, one of the Polish tribes. In the 10th century it became part of the emerging Polish state under first historic ruler Mieszko I of Poland, who erected a new stronghold there. The first known historic record comes from 1010, in Thietmar of Merseburg's chronicles, after the troops of King Henry II of Germany in the conflict over the March of Lusatia and the Milceni lands had attacked the forces of the Polish Duke Bolesław I Chrobry and again besieged Głogów on August 9, 1017, without result. The next year Henry and Bolesław concluded the Peace of Bautzen.

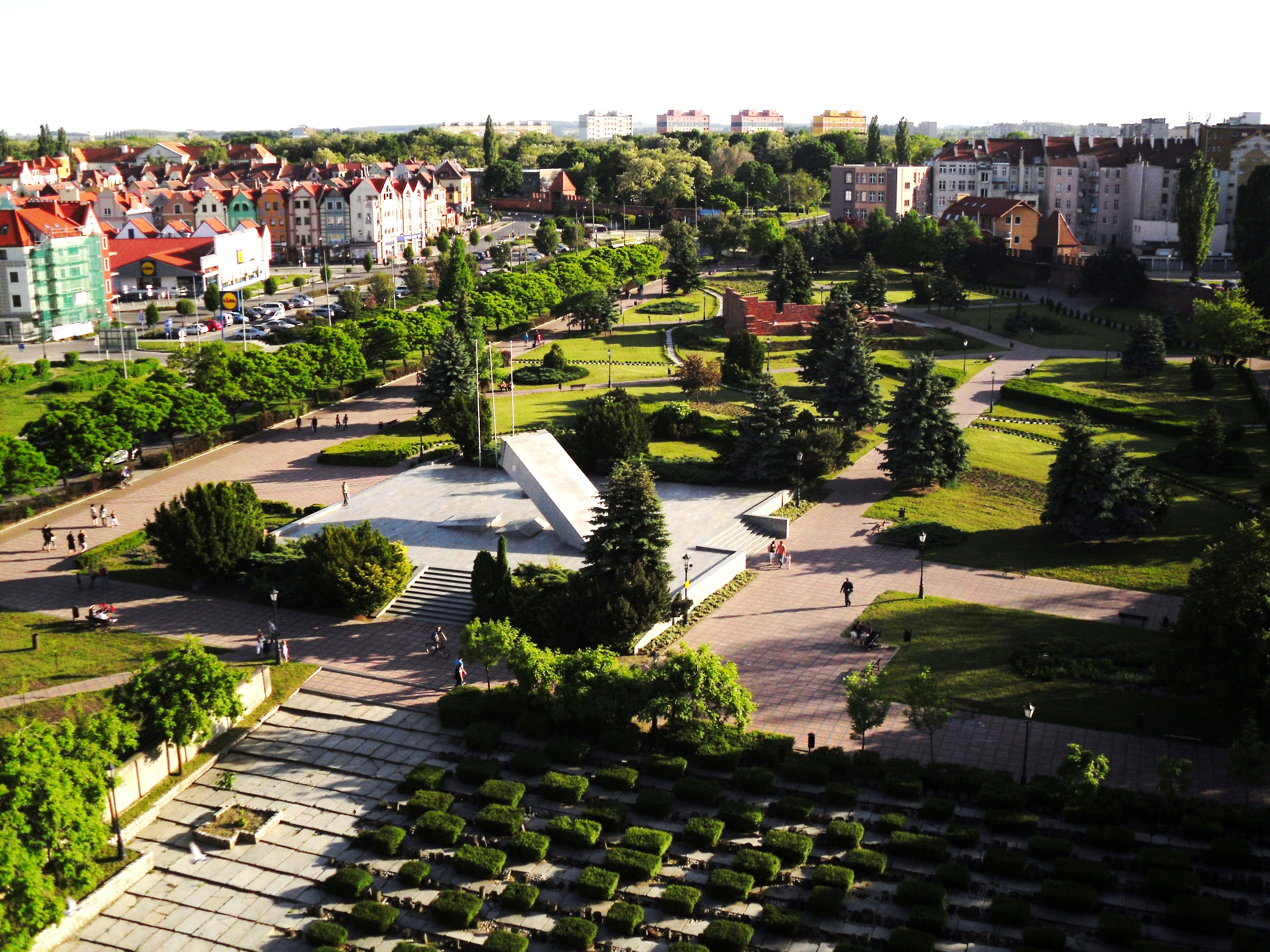
John Paul II Square with the Children of Głogów Monument, commemorating the Polish defense of Głogów in 1109

In 1109, King Henry V of Germany, entangled in the fratricidal war between the Piast dukes Bolesław III Wrymouth and Zbigniew besieged the town, but could not overcome the Polish forces in the Battle of Głogów. In 1157 the town finally fell to the forces of Emperor Frederick I Barbarossa, invading the Silesian lands in aid of Duke Władysław II the Exile and his sons.

In 1180, under the rule of Władysław's II youngest son Konrad Spindleshanks, Głogów was rebuilt and became the residence of his principality, which fell back to the Duchy of Silesia upon his death about 1190. In the course of the fragmentation under Duke Bolesław II the Bald and his younger brother, the Duchy of Głogów under Duke Konrad I was established in 1251. Two years later he vested the town with Magdeburg rights. From the 13th century the city prospered thanks to trade and craft, brewing and clothmaking developed.

Likewise the many Duchies of Silesia, Głogów fell under the overlordship of King John of Bohemia in 1331, and thus the Holy Roman Empire.

In 1462, Głogów hosted a convention of Kings Casimir IV Jagiellon of Poland and George of Poděbrady of Bohemia at which a Bohemian-Polish alliance was concluded.

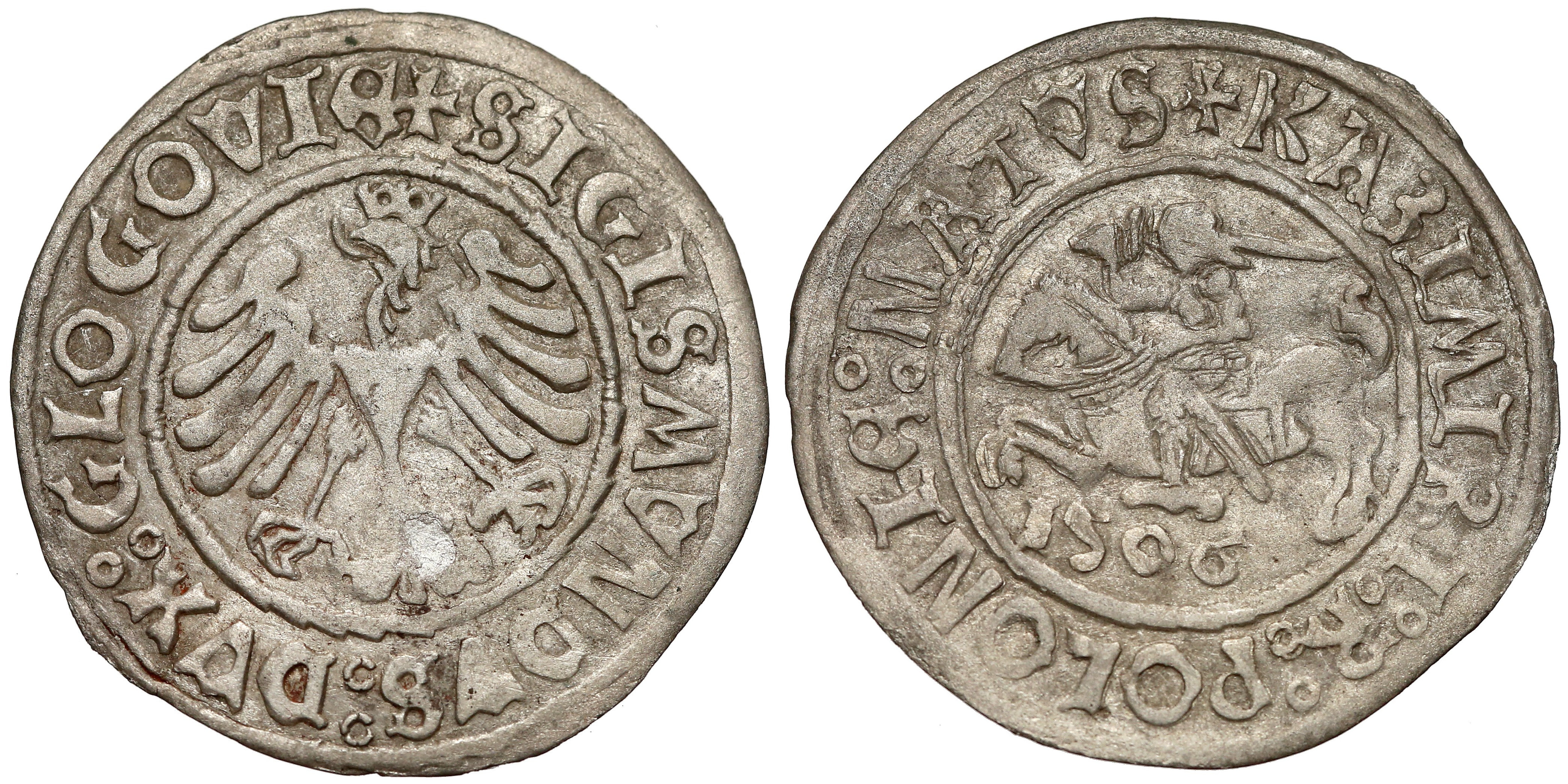
16th-century coin of Sigismund the Old from the local mint

In 1504 century, the Głogów line of the Silesian Piasts died out with the death of Jan II the Mad. Jan's cruel measures had provoked the resistance of the Głogów citizens, and in 1488 the troops of King Matthias Corvinus appeared at the city gates and expelled the duke. In 1491–1506 Głogów was ruled by John Albert and Sigismund the Old, future kings of Poland.

=== Czech, Austrian and Prussian rule ===
In 1506 the duchy was incorporated into the Bohemian (Czech) Kingdom, although Polish King Sigismund I the Old still claimed the duchy before renouncing claims in 1508, while his wife, Polish Queen Bona Sforza still made attempts to reintegrate the city and the duchy with the Kingdom of Poland in 1522, 1526 and 1547. Nevertheless, it remained under the Czech Crown during the rule of the Jagiellonian dynasty until 1526, when it was inherited by the Austrian House of Habsburg and was incorporated into the Habsburg monarchy. During the Thirty Years' War, Głogów was turned into a stronghold in 1630. It was conquered by Protestants in 1632, reconquered by Imperial troops in 1633, fell to Sweden in 1642, and finally reverted to the Habsburgs in 1648.

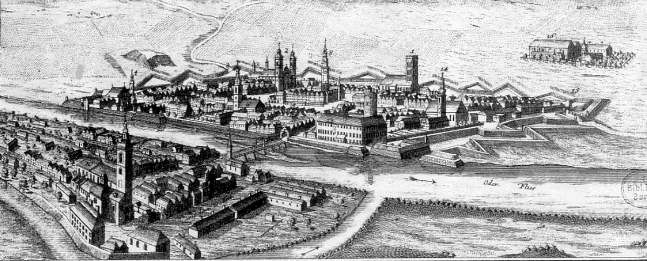
17th-century view of the city

One of two main routes connecting Warsaw and Dresden ran through the city in the 18th century and Kings Augustus II the Strong and Augustus III of Poland traveled that route many times. Głogów remained part of the Habsburg-ruled Crown of Bohemia until the First Silesian War. In March 1741 it was captured in a night attack by the Prussian Army under General Prince Leopold II of Anhalt-Dessau, and like the majority of Silesia became part of Kingdom of Prussia under King Frederick II. The city became known by the Germanized name of Groß-Glogau ("Greater Glogau") to differentiate it from the town of Oberglogau ("Upper Glogau", present-day Głogówek) in Upper Silesia. Despite Germanisation attempts, the population of the area around Głogów was still largely Polish.

During the Napoleonic Wars, the Polish forces of General Jan Henryk Dąbrowski were stationed in the town, and the city was also visited three times by Napoleon Bonaparte. Glogau was captured by French forces after the Battle of Jena in 1806. The town, with a garrison of 9,000 French troops, was besieged in 1813–14 by the Sixth Coalition; by the time the defenders surrendered on 10 April 1814, only 1,800 defenders remained. In 1815, after the Congress of Vienna, Glogau became part of the Prussian Province of Silesia and was therefore a part of the German Confederation and as of 1867 a part of the North German Confederation.

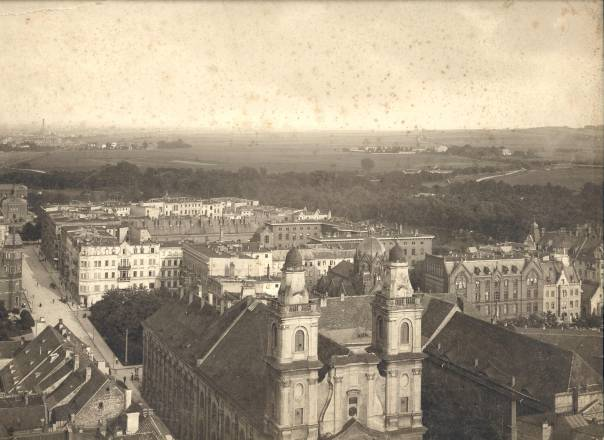
Early 20th-century view of the city

Because the stronghold status had slowed down the city's development for many years, the citizens tried to abolish the stronghold status in the 19th century; the fortifications were only moved to the east in 1873, and finally taken down in 1902, which allowed the city to develop. After 1871, the city was part of the German Empire, within which it remained after the Treaty of Versailles of 1919.

In 1939 it had 33,000 mostly German inhabitants. During World War II, the Germans established six forced labour camps in the town, including a subcamp of the Nazi prison for youth in Wołów (in the present-day Paulinów district). In 1942–1945, there was also a transit camp for kidnapped Polish children intended for Germanisation, and in 1944, a transit camp for Poles transported from the Dulag 121 transit camp in Pruszków near Warsaw after the suppression of the 1944 Warsaw Uprising. Many Polish resistance members were imprisoned and sentenced to prison or death in the city. The city was made into a stronghold by the German government early in 1945 in the last stages of World War II. It was besieged for six weeks by the Soviet Red Army, which left 98% of the buildings completely destroyed.

=== In modern Poland ===
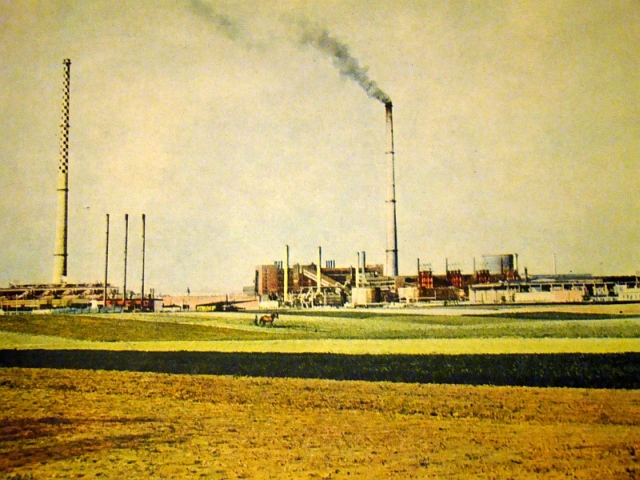
Głogów Copper Smelter in the 1970s

After May 1945, the city and the majority of Lower Silesia fell into the Soviet Zone of Occupation who expelled its German population in accordance with the Potsdam Agreement and began replacing them with Polish settlers who came to the once again Polish city of Głogów to find a seriously war-damaged town; it has not been fully rebuilt to this day. The town started to develop again only in 1957, after a copper foundry was built there. It is still the largest industrial company in the town. It has since become a major world supplier of silver, which along with gold is often found in copper ore. In 1974, Głogów was awarded the Order of Polonia Restituta, one of the highest Polish state decorations.

In 1945–1950, Głogów was part of Wrocław Voivodeship and in 1950 became part of the newly created Zielona Góra Voivodeship. In 1975–1998, it belonged to Legnica Voivodeship, and after the administrative reform of 1999, it became part of Lower Silesian Voivodeship.

== Landmarks ==
Historic sights in Głogów (examples)

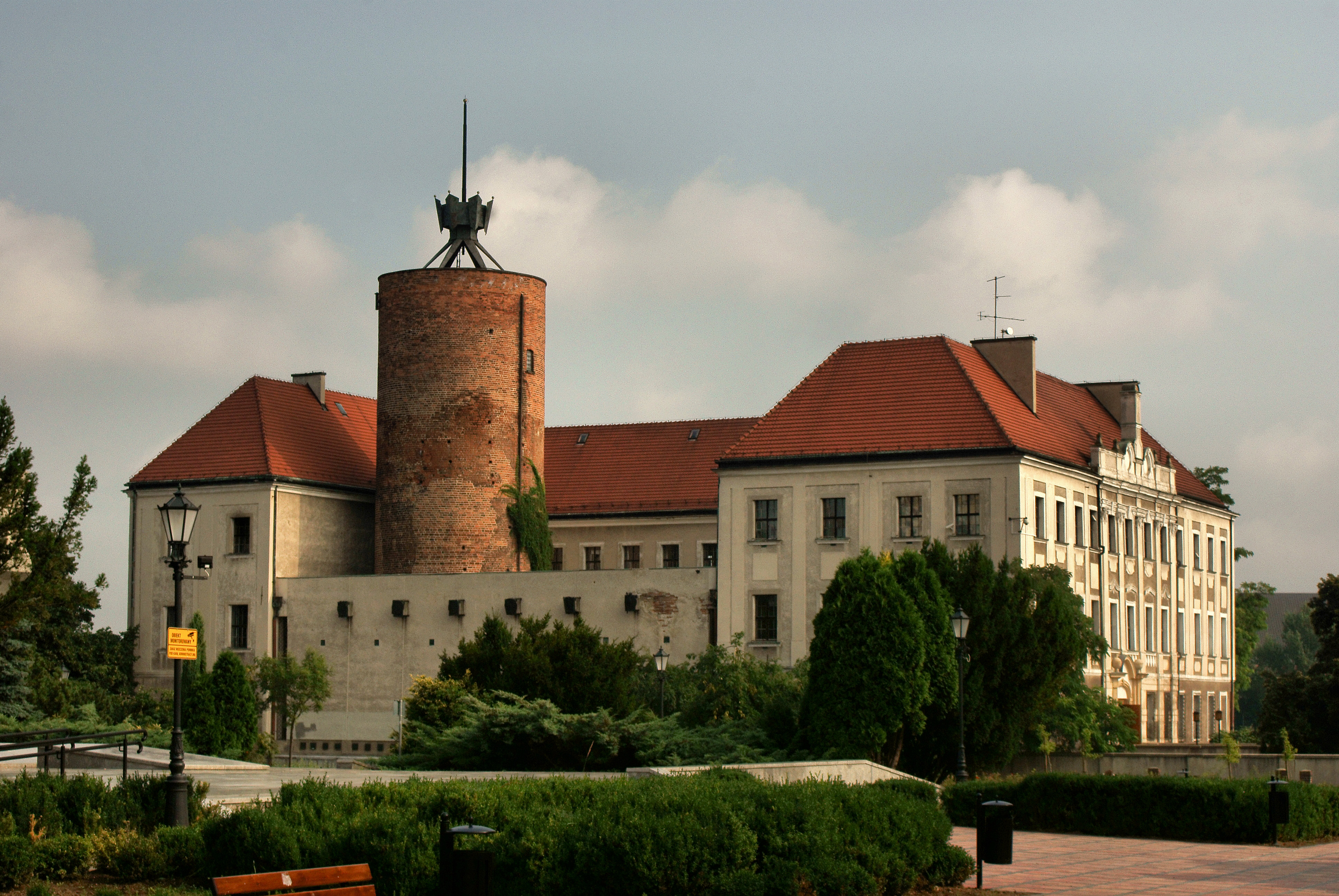
Castle of the Dukes of Głogów

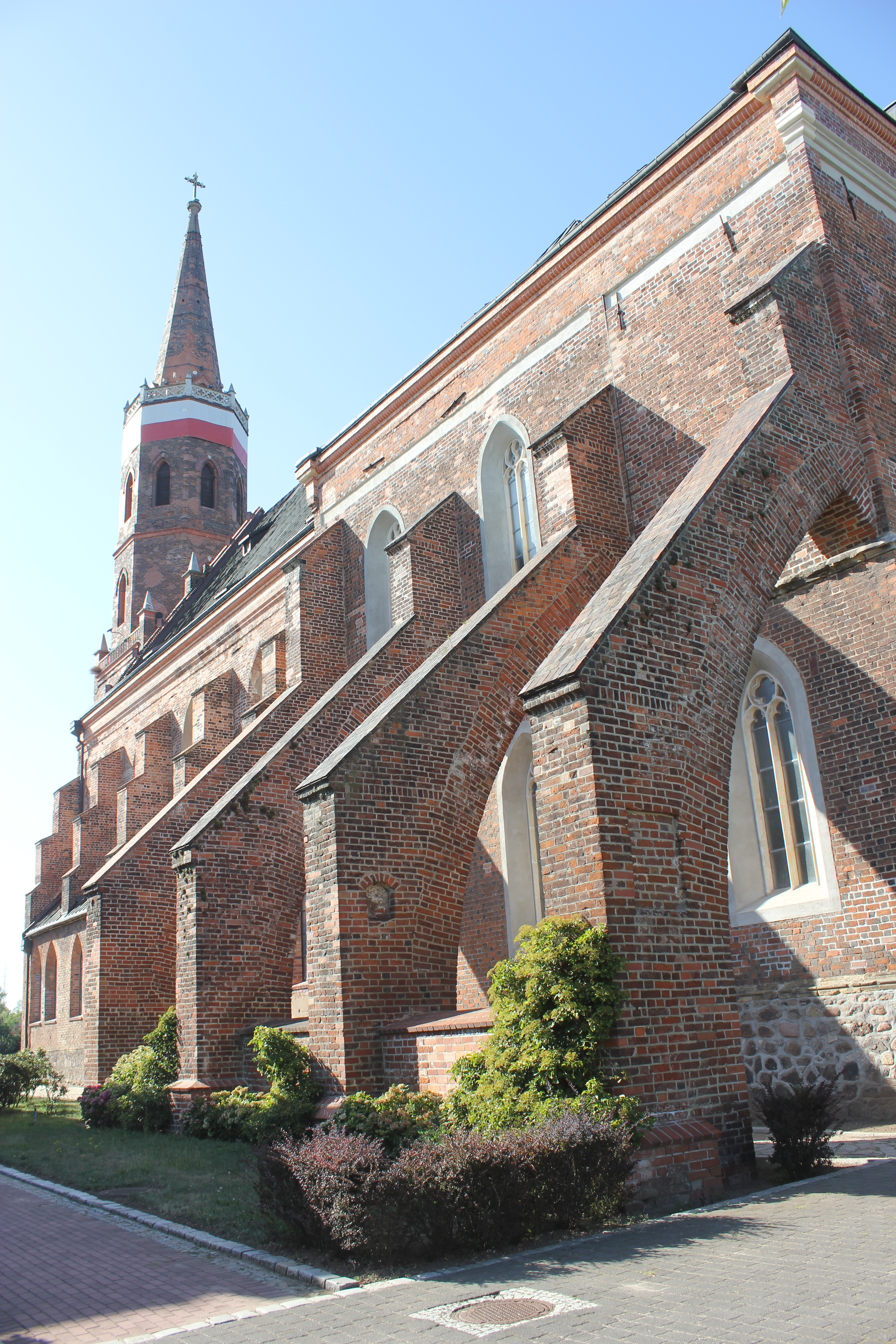
Gothic Collegiate Church

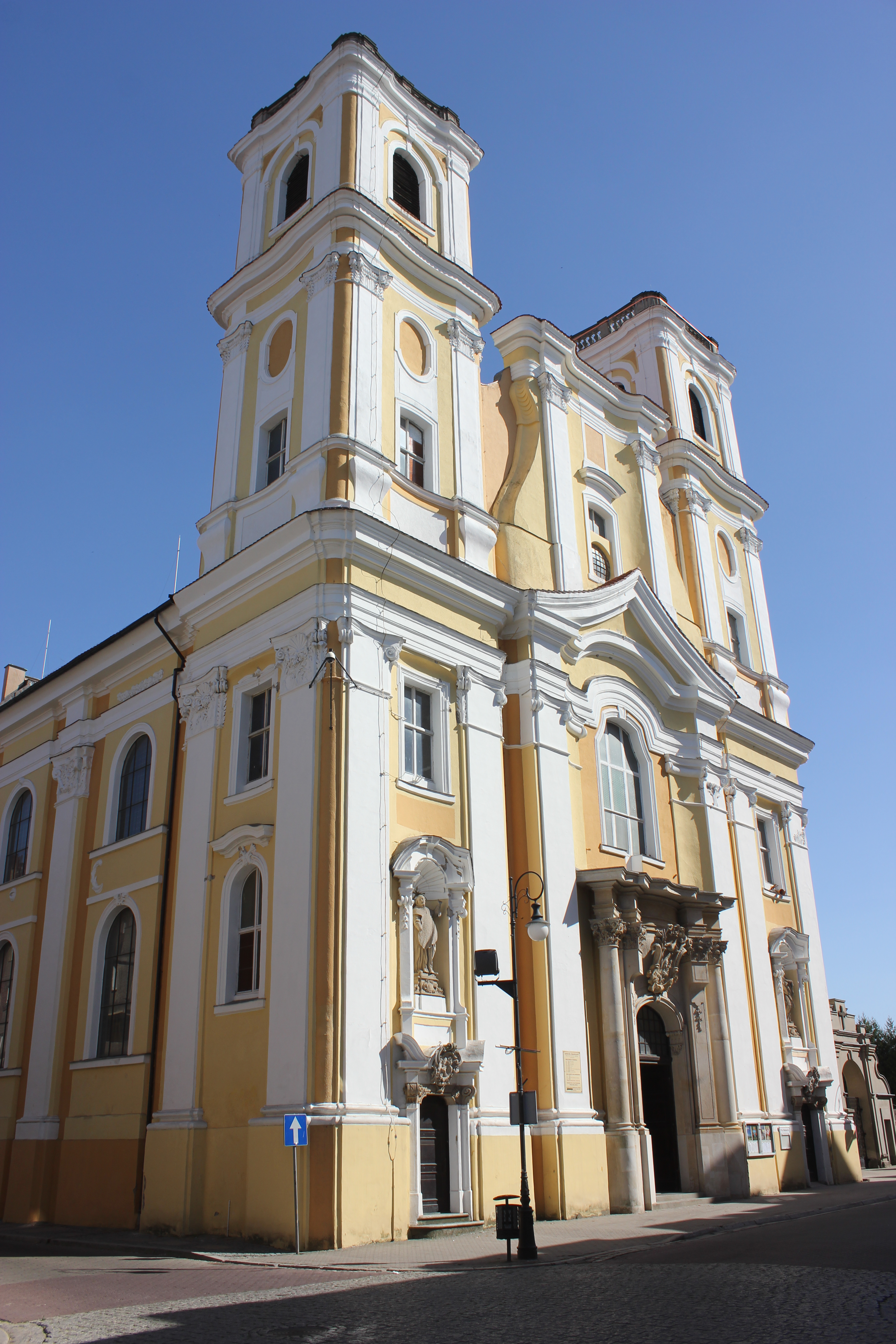
Baroque Corpus Christi church

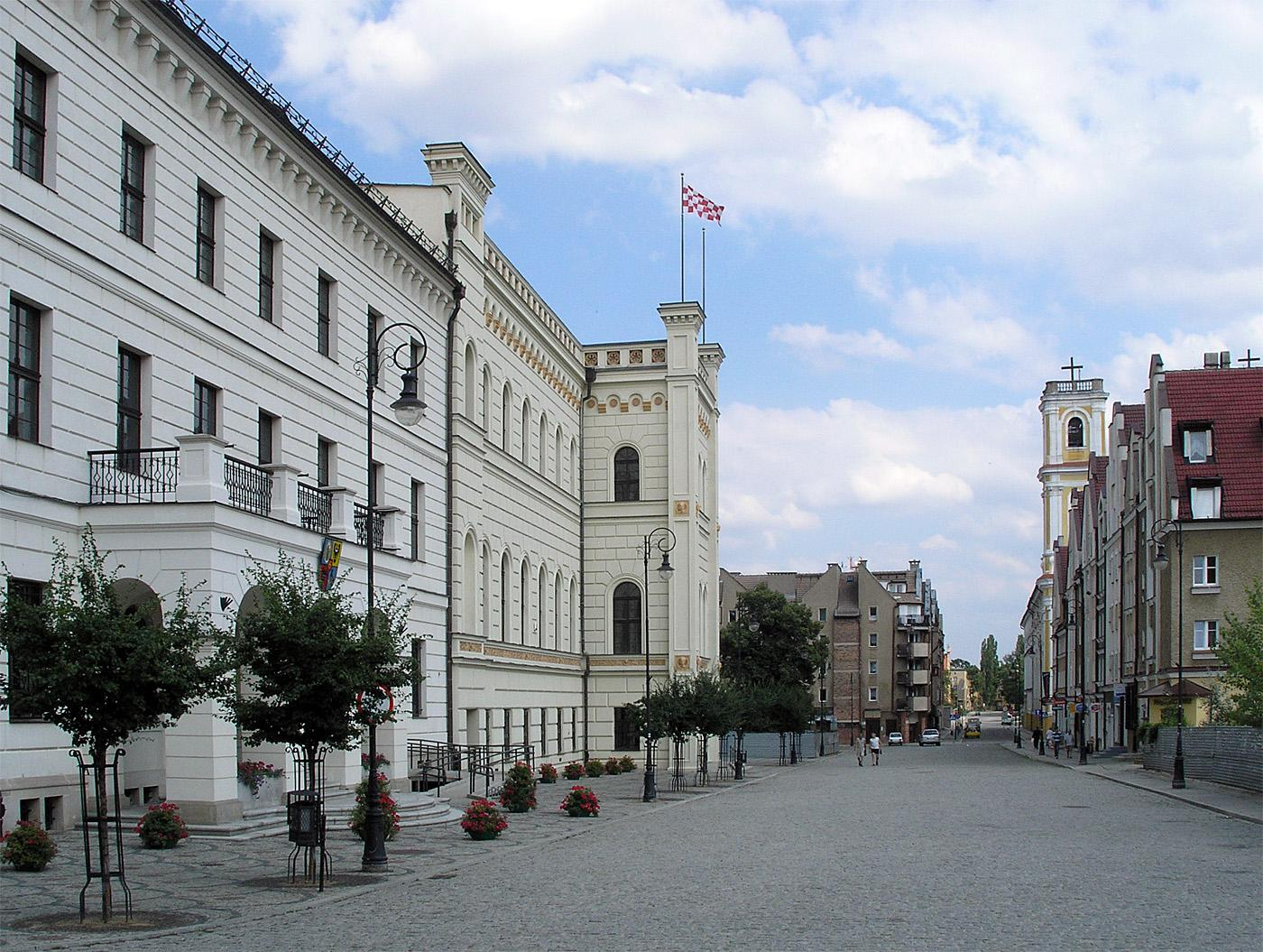
Market Square with the town hall

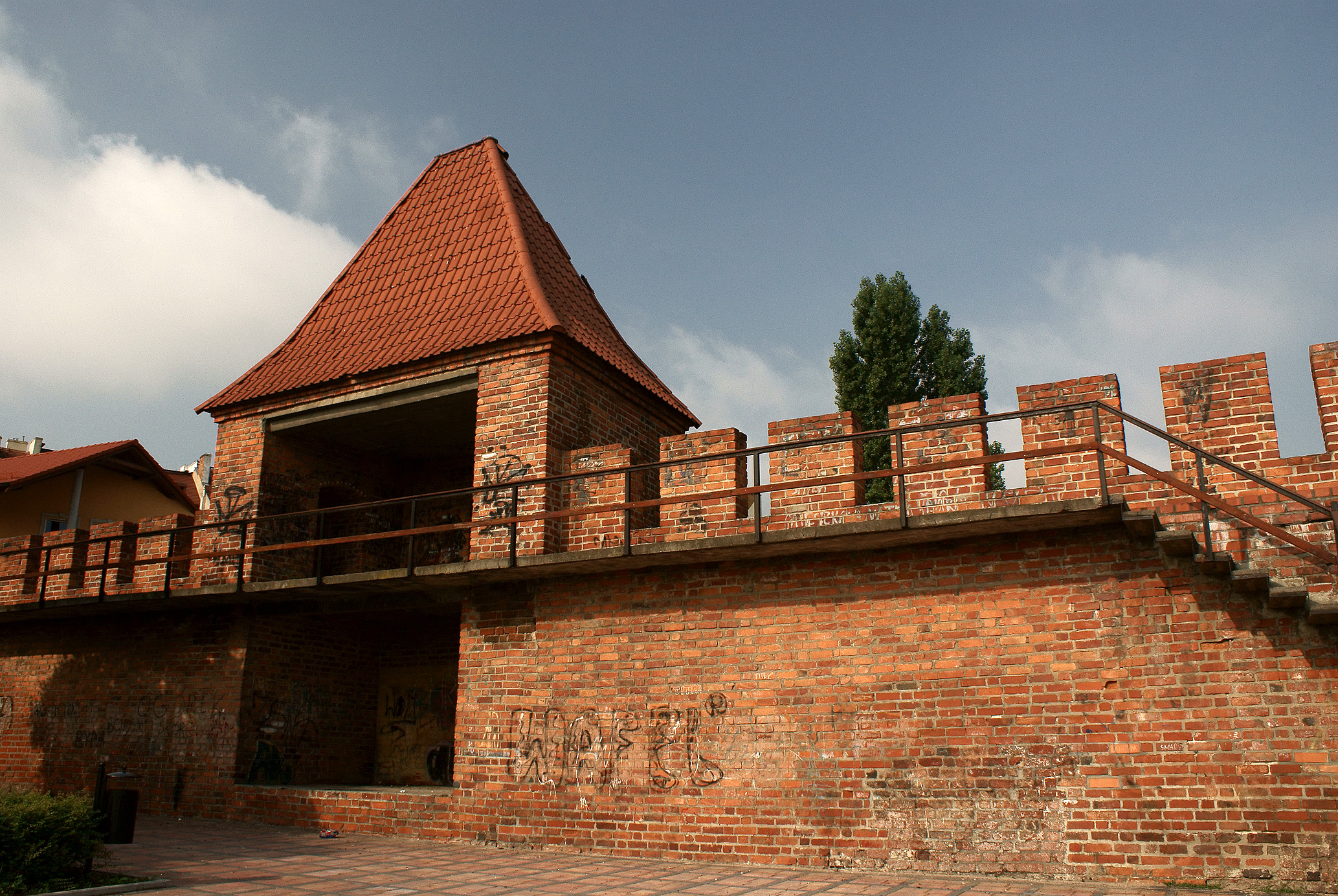
Old defensive walls

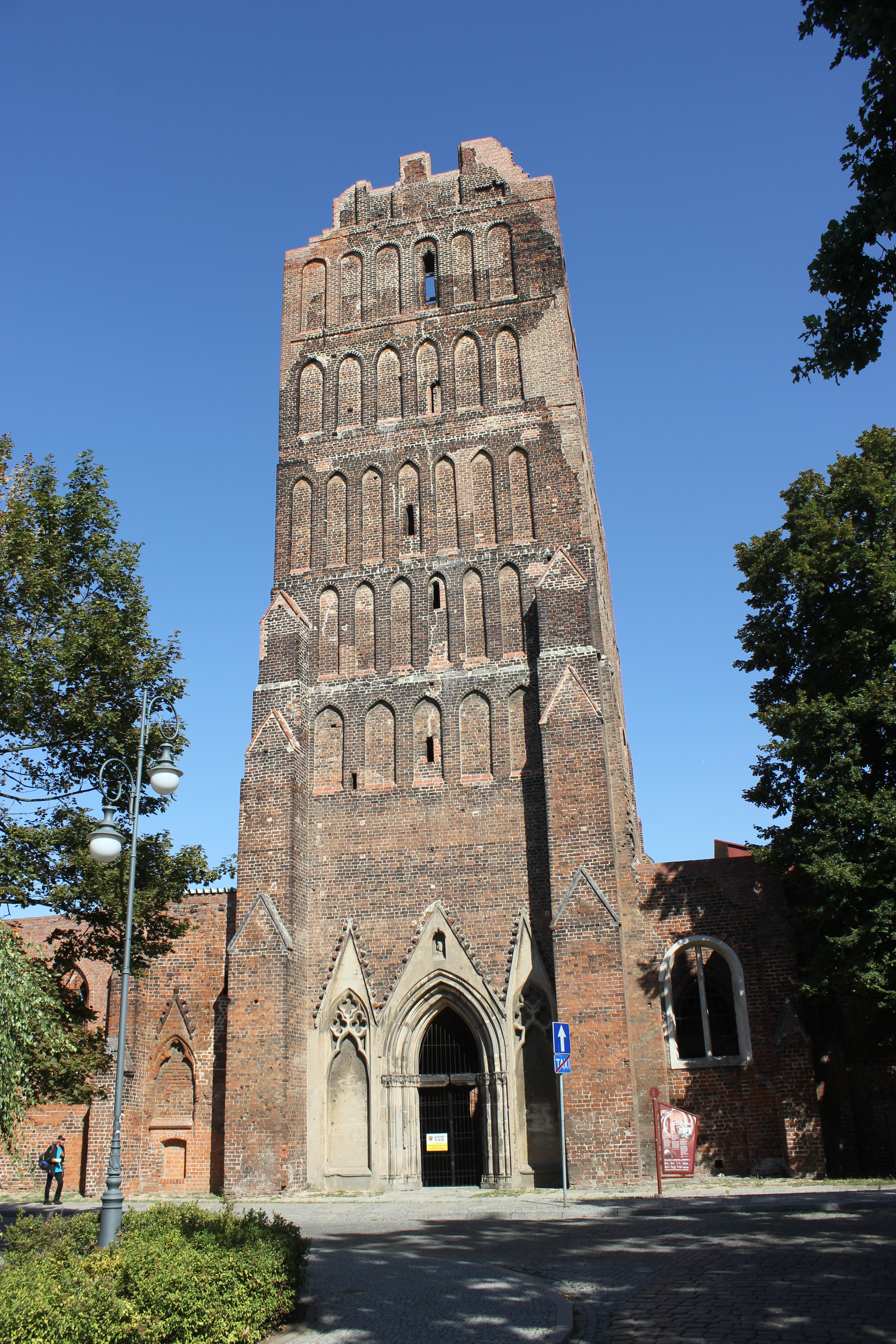
Ruins of the Gothic St. Nicholas church

- Town Hall
- Castle of the dukes of Głogów (currently the site of an archaeological museum)
- Late Baroque Corpus Christi Church
- Gothic Collegiate Church of the Assumption of the Blessed Virgin Mary
- 16th-century Church of St. Lawrence
- Early Gothic Church of St. Nicholas (in ruins)
- Andreas Gryphius Theatre
- Fragments of medieval city walls
- Children of Głogów Monument, commemorating the 1109 Polish defense of Głogów
- 17th-century moat
- 19th-century artillery tower,
- Park Leśny

== Sports ==
The city's major sports clubs are handball team SPR Chrobry Głogów, which competes in the Polish Superliga, the country's top division, and football team MZKS Chrobry Głogów, which competes in the I liga, the country's second division (as of 2026–27). Both teams are named after medieval Polish King Bolesław I the Brave (Bolesław I Chrobry).

== Notable people ==
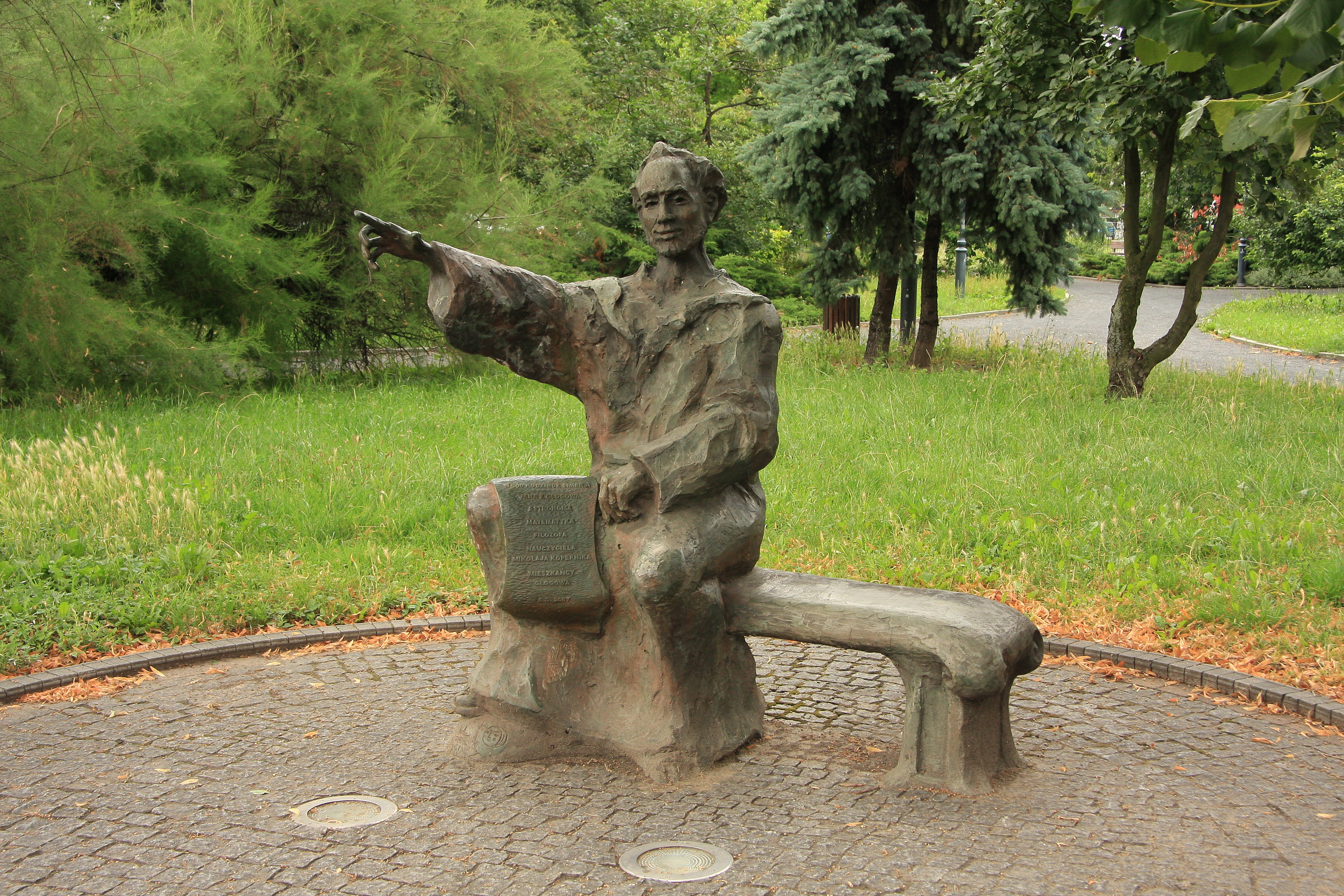
Jan of Głogów Monument

- Bolesław I the Tall (1127–1201), duke of Silesia
- Bolesław II the Bald (1220/25–1278), duke of Silesia
- David Cassel (1818–1893), historian and theologian
- Paulus Stephanus Cassel (1821–1892), writer and missionary
- Henry Jacob Cowan (1919–2007), architectural scientist, educator and structural engineer
- Johannes Dümichen (1833–1894), Egyptologist
- Johann Samuel Ersch (1766–1828), bibliographer
- Johannes Fabian (1937–2026), anthropologist
- Recha Freier née Schweitzer (1892–1984), founder of the Youth Aliyah organization
- Georg Gustav Fülleborn (1769–1803), philosopher and philologist.
- Andreas Gryphius (1616–1664), poet and dramatist.
- Hedwig of Andechs (1174–1243), wife of Duke Henry I
- Henryk I the Bearded (1163–1238), duke of Lower Silesia
- Jan of Głogów (1445–1507), philosopher, polyhistor, professor at Kraków University
- Joannes-Henricus de Franckenberg (1726–1804), archbishop of Mechelen
- Johann Hartmann (1726–1793), composer and violinist
- Selig Hecht (1892–1947), physiologist
- Arthur von Posadowsky-Wehner (1845-1932), German politician
- John I of Poland (1459–1501), Duke of Lower Silesia and king of Poland.
- Radosław Kawęcki (born 1991), swimmer
- Denis Labryga (born 1996), mixed martial artist
- Czesław Litwin (born 1955), politician
- Jan Kazimierz Lubomirski (1692–1737), nobleman
- Tomasz Markowski (born 1975), chess player
- Eduard Munk (1803–1871), philologist
- Salomon Munk (1803–1867), orientalist
- Ernst Christoph von Nassau, (1686–1755). Prussian Lieutenant General
- Joachim Pastorius (1611–1681), historian
- Michał Przysiężny (born 1984), tennis player
- Leopold Friedrich Raab (1721–?), violinist and composer
- Elżbieta Romanowska (born 1983), film, television and theater actress
- Felix Stern (1884–1941), neurologist, most important German investigator of the disorder "encephalitis lethargica"
- Ferdinand Thieriot (1838–1919), composer
- Arnold Zweig (1887–1968), writer

== Twin towns – sister cities ==
Głogów is twinned with:

- Amber Valley, United Kingdom
- Eisenhüttenstadt, Germany
- Kamianets-Podilskyi, Ukraine
- Laholm, Sweden
- Langenhagen, Germany
- Riesa, Germany
