= Siege of Głogów =

1109 siege in Poland

Coordinates: 51°40′14″N 16°5′34″E

- Part of 1109 German-Polish War
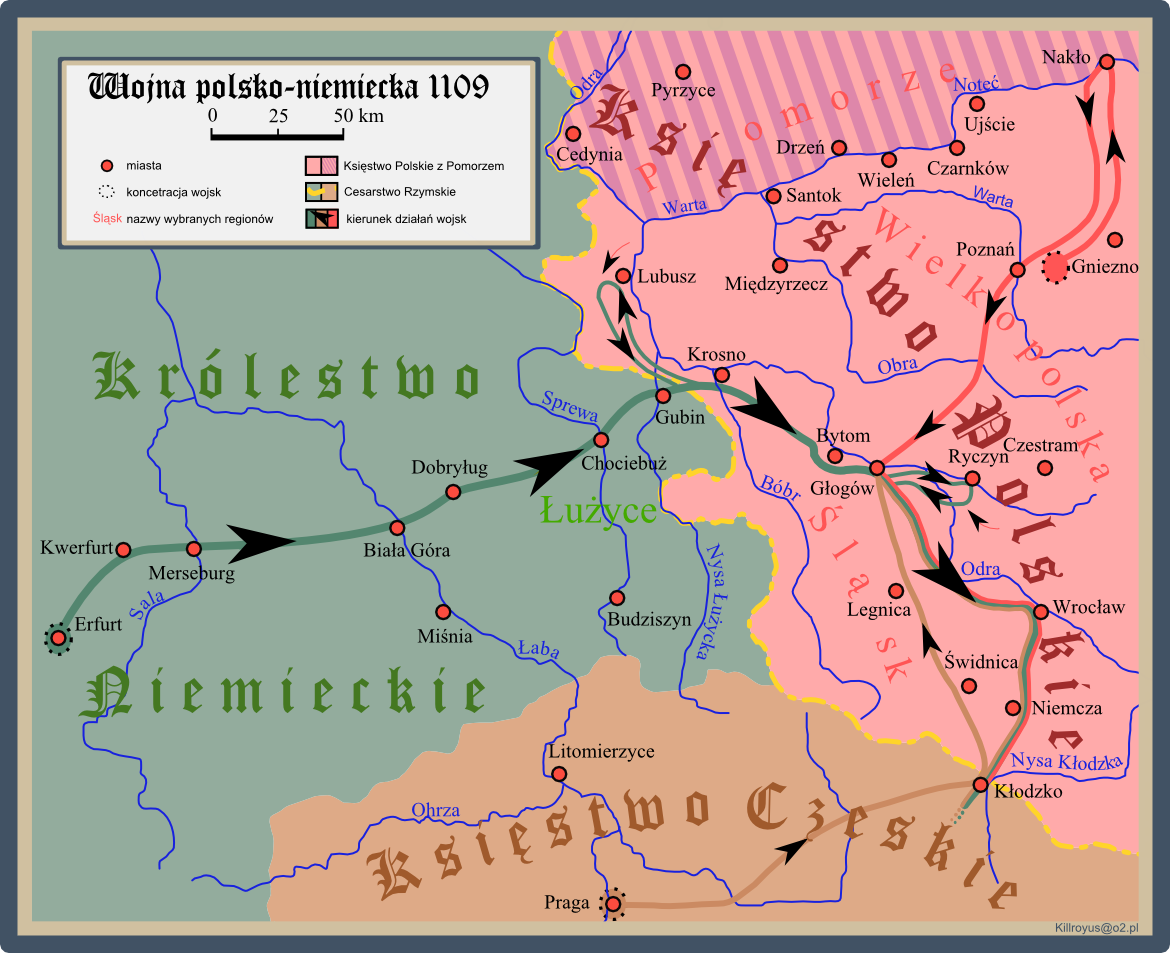
- Campaigns of Henry V's 1109 expedition against Poland
Date	24 August – c. 14–15 September 1109
Location	Głogów, Kingdom of Poland
Result	Polish victory

Belligerents
Kingdom of Poland	Holy Roman Empire; Duchy of Bohemia

Commanders and leaders
Bolesław III Wrymouth	Henry V of Germany; Svatopluk of Bohemia †

Strength
Unknown	c. 10,000

Casualties and losses
Unknown	Unknown

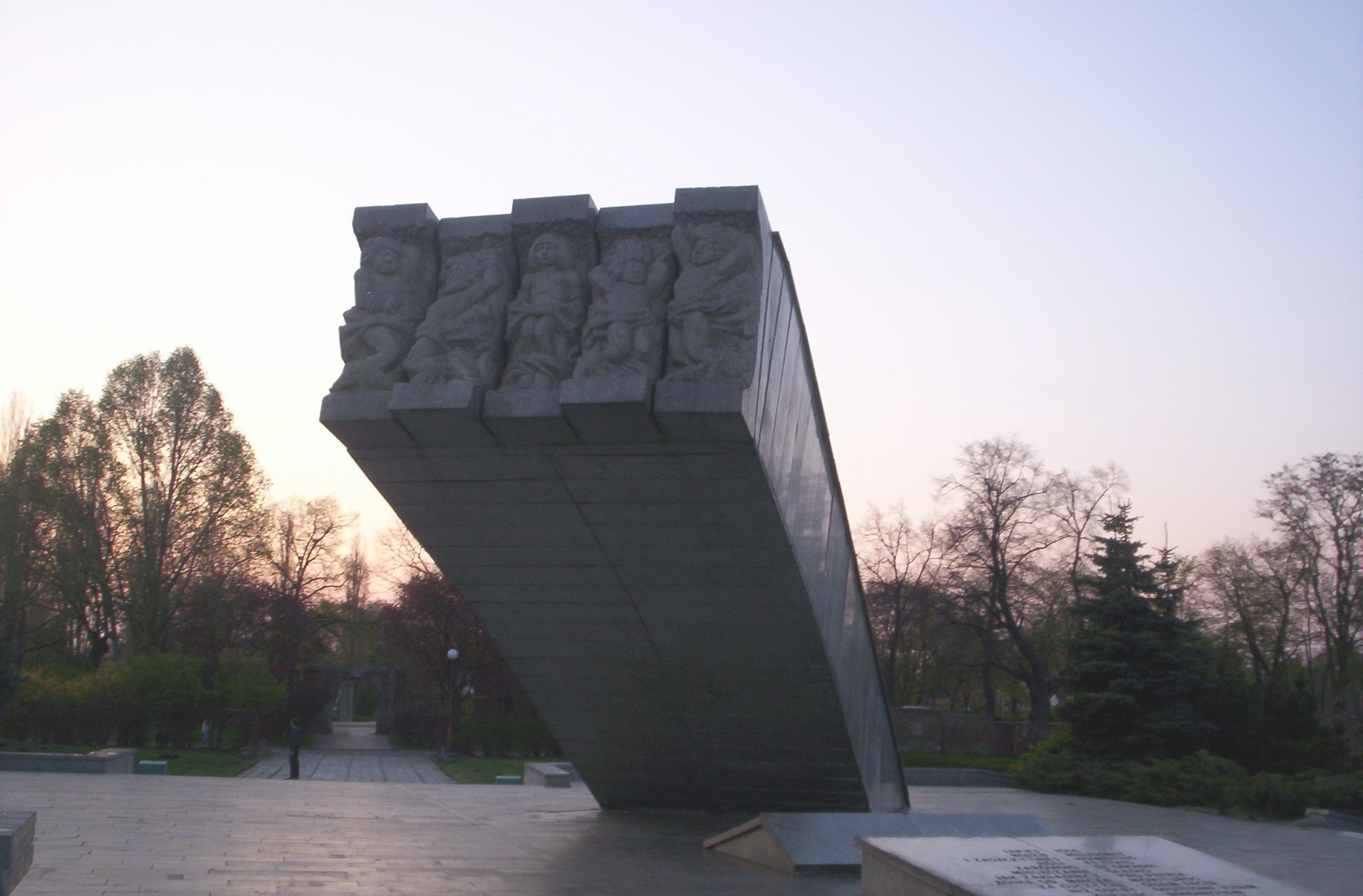
Monument to the children of Głogów

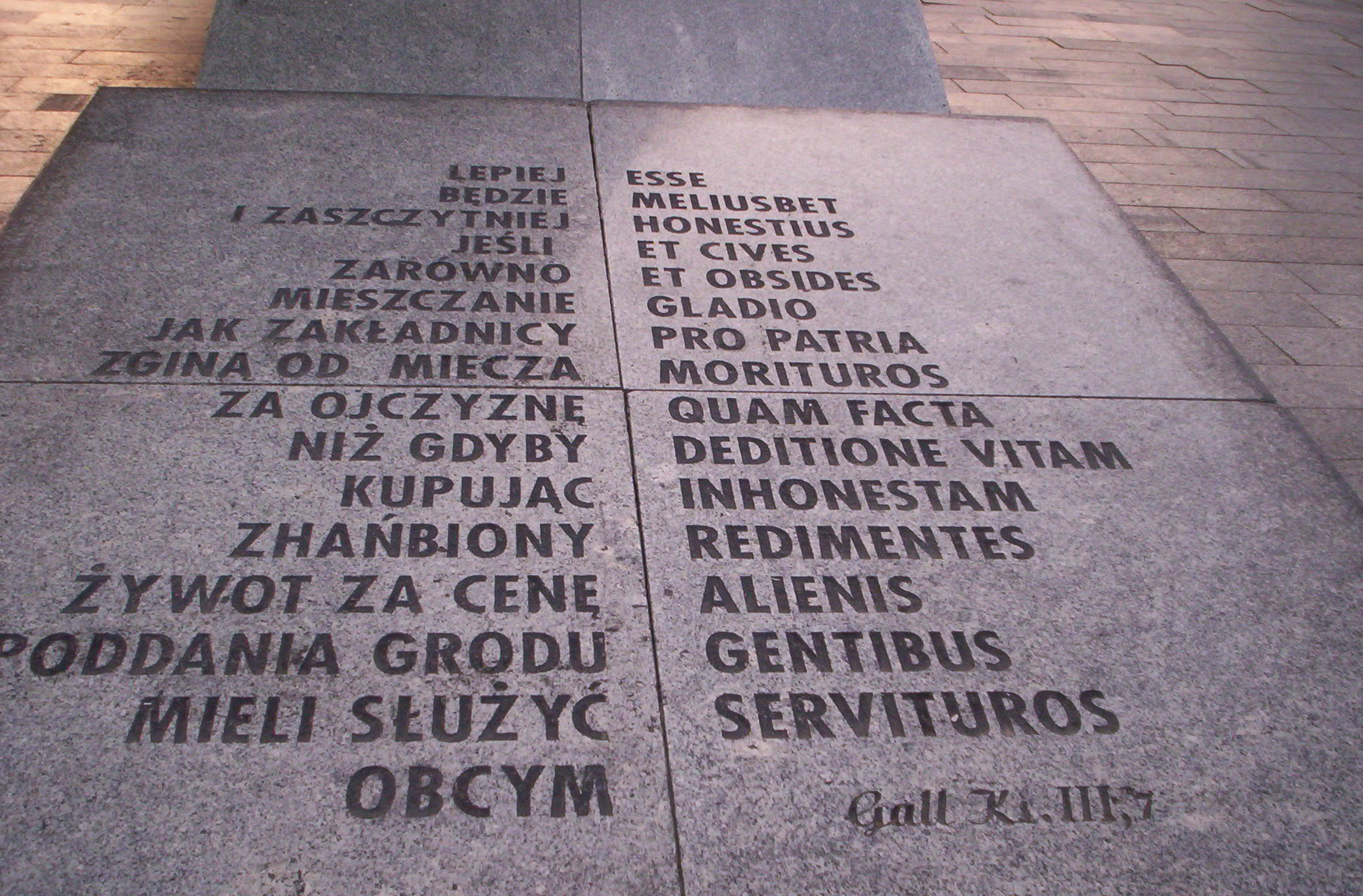
Inscription citing Gallus Anonymus: "It is better and more honourable if the citizens as well as the hostages die by the sword for the fatherland than by submission pay for a dishonourable life as slaves of alien masters."

The Siege of Głogów or Defense of Głogów (German: Schlacht bei Glogau, Polish: Obrona Głogowa) took place on 24 August 1109 at the Silesian town of Głogów, between the Kingdom of Poland and the Holy Roman Empire. The event, recorded by the chronicler Gallus Anonymus in his Gesta principum Polonorum, is one of the most well-known episodes of early Polish medieval history. The Polish army was led by Duke Bolesław III Wrymouth, while the invading Imperial forces were commanded by King Henry V of Germany and included a Bohemian contingent under Duke Svatopluk of Bohemia. The Polish defense ended in a victory after the siege proved fruitless and was abandoned, and the episode later attained legendary status in Polish historiography.

== Prelude ==
After a long-term rivalry within the ruling Piast dynasty, Bolesław III, in 1107, had finally expelled his elder half-brother and co-ruler Duke Zbigniew from Poland. Zbigniew fled to the Holy Roman Empire where he sought help from King Henry V. The King, however, did not take action as he was stuck in an inner-Hungarian rivalry, supporting the Árpád Prince Álmos against his brother King Coloman, and had started an armed expedition to Bratislava (Pozsony).

Henry tangled with Bolesław when the Polish duke, loyal to King Coloman, took the occasion to campaign in the Bohemian lands in 1108: as soon as the Bohemian Duke Svatopluk heard of the invasion, he left the Imperial army to oust the Polish troops. Left alone, King Henry was forced to abandon his Hungarian campaign.

Chafing under this defeat, Henry finally associated himself with Zbigniew and requested Bolesław to reinstate his half-brother as co-ruler, as well as to pay an annual tribute to the Empire. The Polish Duke categorically rejected both demands. The next year, the German forces gathered at Erfurt, crossed the Polish border near Krosno on the Bóbr River, and on St. Bartholomew's Day approached the fortified town of Głogów (Svatopluk's troops arrived in September). At first they defeated a Polish garrison which was stationed near the town, while Bolesław rushed from his battle against the Pomeranians at Nakło.

== Siege ==
According to Gallus' Gesta principum Polonorum, King Henry resorted to lay siege to Głogów but granted its citizens a five-day ceasefire to ask their King for permission to surrender. He allegedly even made the townsmen give up their children as hostages as a guarantee of the ceasefire, and promised to give them back alive no matter what Bolesław's answer would be.

The Polish Duke, however, had no intention to hand over the city, and ordered the defense of Głogów. After the five days were up, King Henry began to barrage the town. Breaking his promise, he chained the child hostages to his siege engines, hoping that the people of Głogów would not shoot their own offspring, which would allow him to conquer the Polish settlement. However, Gallus stated that his cruelty towards children only strengthened the resolve of Głogów's defenders. Several harsh attacks by the Imperial army were repulsed, while Henry suffered significant losses by Polish guerilla fighters. After many days of unsuccessful fighting, the King was forced to abandon the siege and march south.

== Aftermath ==
King Henry's campaign turned out to be a complete failure, when it ended in Bolesław's final victory at the Battle of Hundsfeld (Psie Pole). Duke Svatopluk was assassinated - probably by Bohemian Vršovci liensmen - still at the Głogów camp on September 21. His successor, Vladislaus, reconciled with Bolesław, whereafter Zbigniew was able to return to Poland in 1111, only to be arrested and blinded by his half-brother shortly afterwards. Bolesław's position towards the Empire was strengthened, and in the following years he was able to consolidate his rule in Pomerania and Lubusz Land. It was not until 1157, when Emperor Frederick Barbarossa in aid of the Silesian Duke Władysław II the Exile launched a successful campaign to the Polish lands.

After centuries-long ambivalent relations with Germany, the successful defense and the tradition of Henry's cruelty had evolved to a key element in the memory of the Polish nation. A first memorial stone was erected by the Głogów citizens on the occasion of the 850th anniversary of the battle in 1959. On 1 September 1979 a large Socialist Realistic memorial to the Głogów children was inaugurated to commemorate not only the 870th anniversary but also the 40th memorial day of the German Invasion of Poland.

The Battle of Głogów is commemorated on the Tomb of the Unknown Soldier, Warsaw, with the inscription "GLOGOW 1109".
