= Dzietrzychowice =

- Village
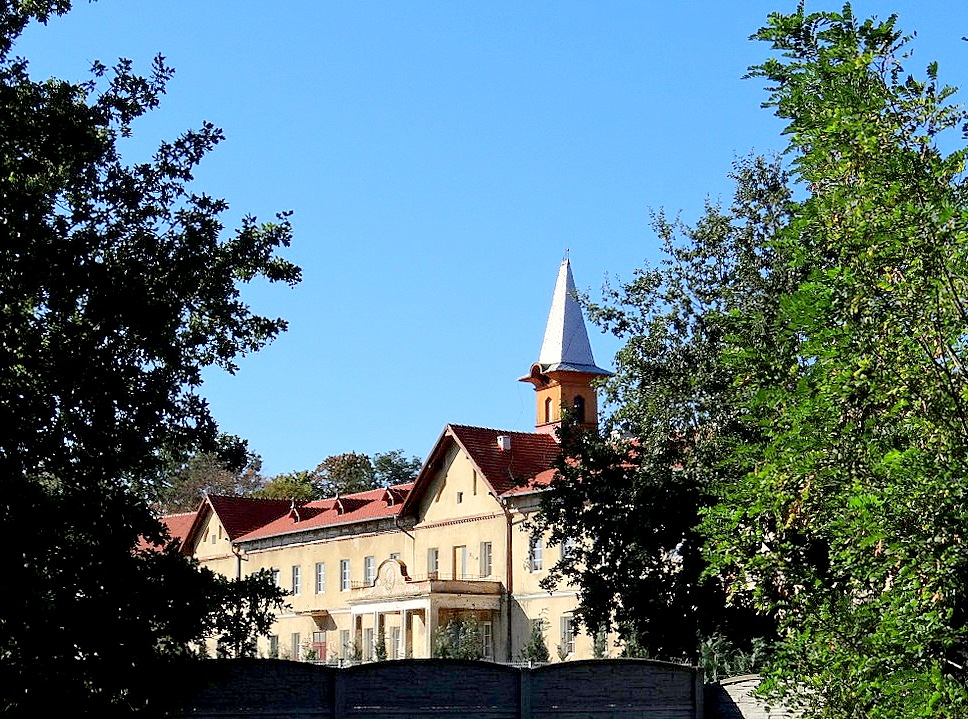
- Palace

- Location within Poland
- Coordinates: 51°39′N 15°22′E
- Country: Poland
- Voivodeship: Lubusz
- County: Żagań
- Gmina: Żagań
- Population: 800

Dzietrzychowice [d͡ʑɛtʂɨxɔˈvit͡sɛ] is a village in the administrative district of Gmina Żagań, within Żagań County, Lubusz Voivodeship, in western Poland.
