= Bożnów =

- Village
- Location within Poland
- Coordinates: 51°37′N 15°22′E
- Country: Poland
- Voivodeship: Lubusz
- County: Żagań
- Gmina: Żagań

Bożnów [ˈbɔʐnuf] is a village in the administrative district of Gmina Żagań, within Żagań County, Lubusz Voivodeship, in western Poland.
