= Dybów, Lubusz Voivodeship =

Dybów
- Village
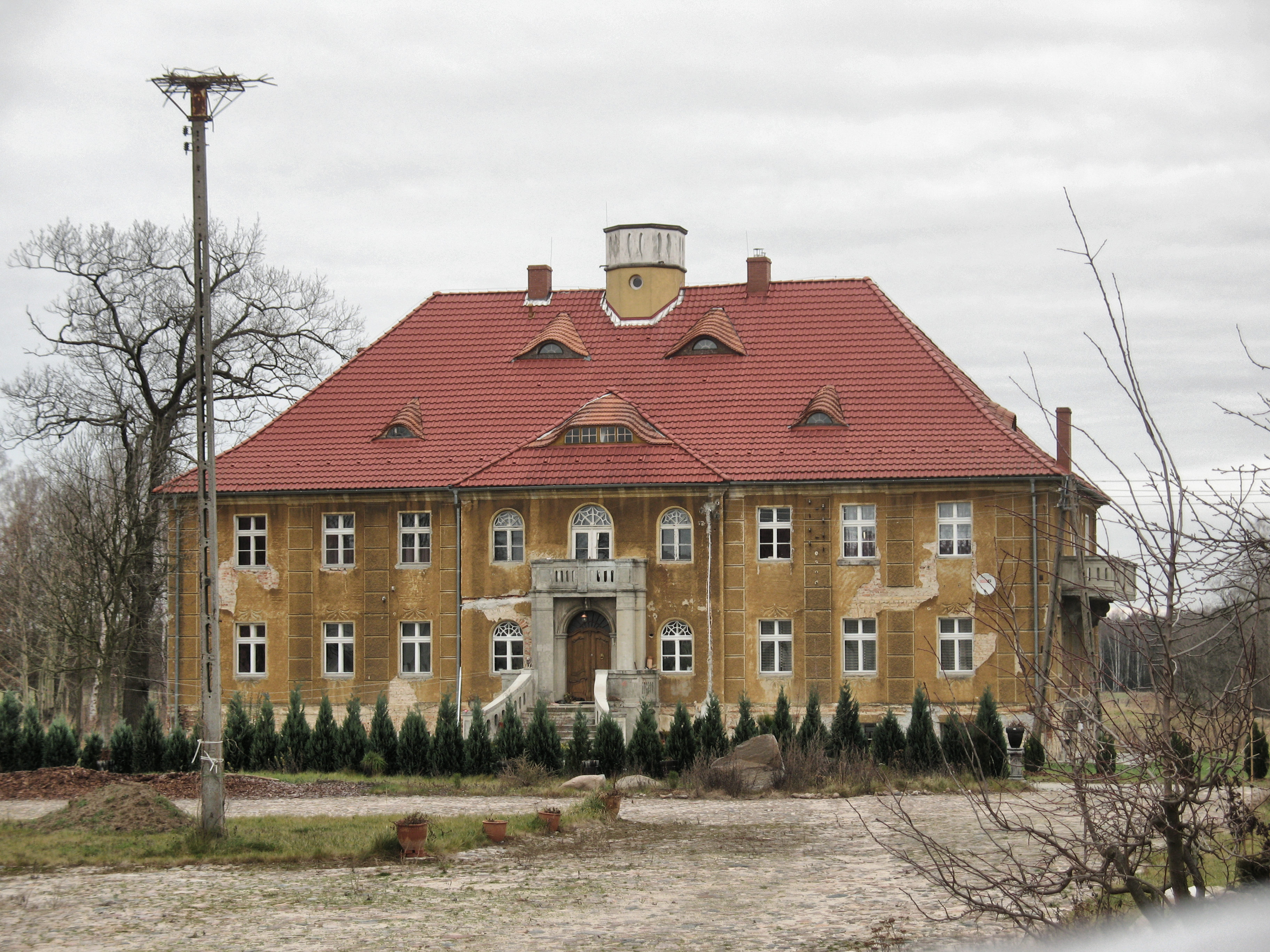
- Manor

- Location within Poland
- Coordinates: 51°44′25″N 15°17′14″E
- Country: Poland
- Voivodeship: Lubusz
- County: Żagań
- Gmina: Żagań

Dybów [ˈdɨbuf] is a village in the administrative district of Gmina Żagań, within Żagań County, Lubusz Voivodeship, in western Poland.
