= Wrzesiny, Lubusz Voivodeship =

Wrzesiny
- Village
- Location within Poland
- Coordinates: 51°42′N 15°26′E
- Country: Poland
- Voivodeship: Lubusz
- County: Żagań
- Gmina: Brzeźnica
- Population: 373

Wrzesiny [vʐɛˈɕinɨ] is a village in the administrative district of Gmina Brzeźnica, within Żagań County, Lubusz Voivodeship, in western Poland.
