= Nieradza =

- Village
- Location within Poland
- Coordinates: 51°38′28″N 15°27′10″E
- Country: Poland
- Voivodeship: Lubusz
- County: Żagań
- Gmina: Żagań

Nieradza [ɲɛˈrad͡za] is a village in the administrative district of Gmina Żagań, within Żagań County, Lubusz Voivodeship, in western Poland.
