= Bukowina Bobrzańska =

- Village
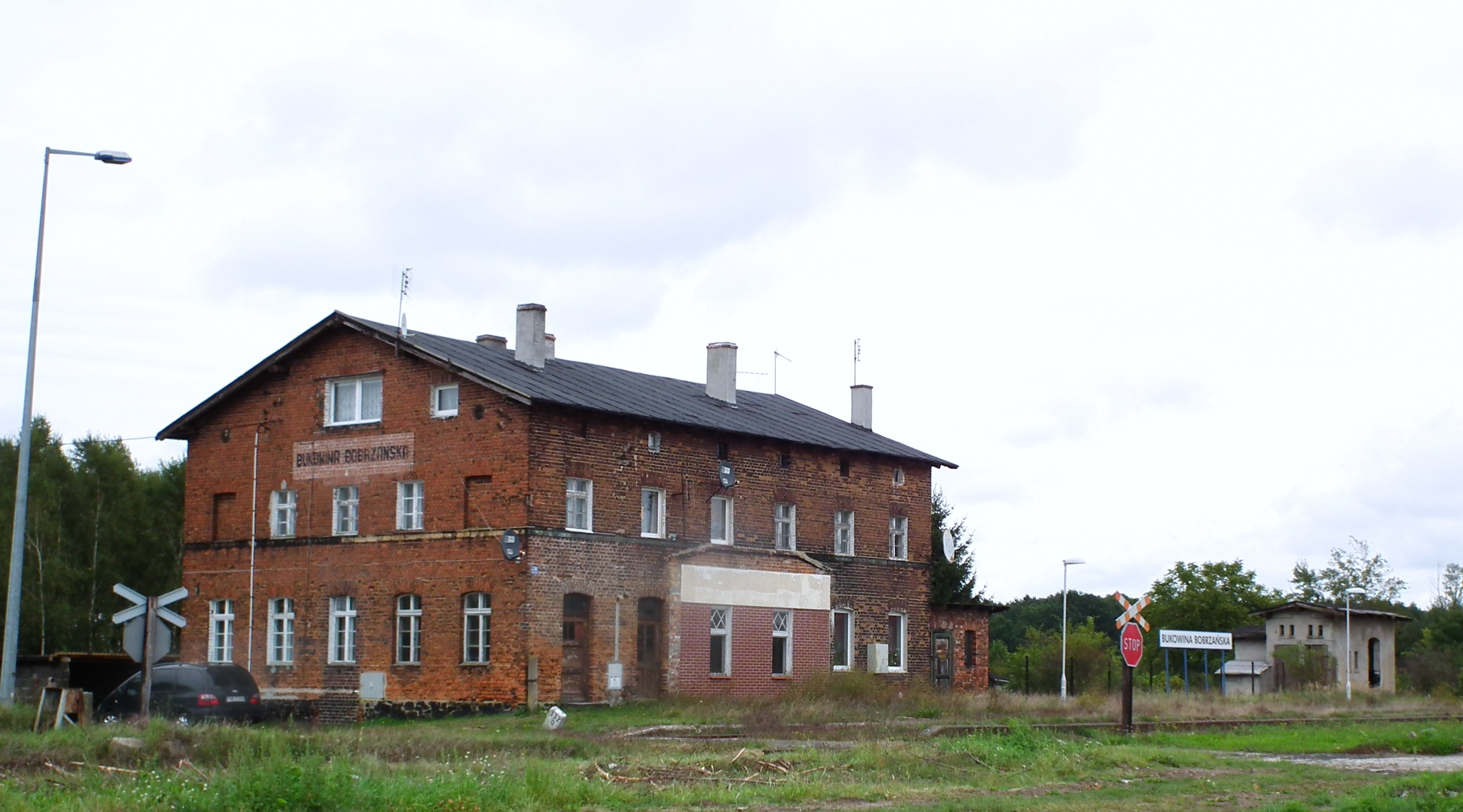
- Railway station

- Location within Poland
- Coordinates: 51°35′37″N 15°25′27″E
- Country: Poland
- Voivodeship: Lubusz
- County: Żagań
- Gmina: Żagań

Bukowina Bobrzańska [bukɔˈvina bɔˈbʐaɲska] is a village in the administrative district of Gmina Żagań, within Żagań County, Lubusz Voivodeship, in western Poland.
