= Jabłonów, Lubusz Voivodeship =

Jabłonów, Poland
- Village
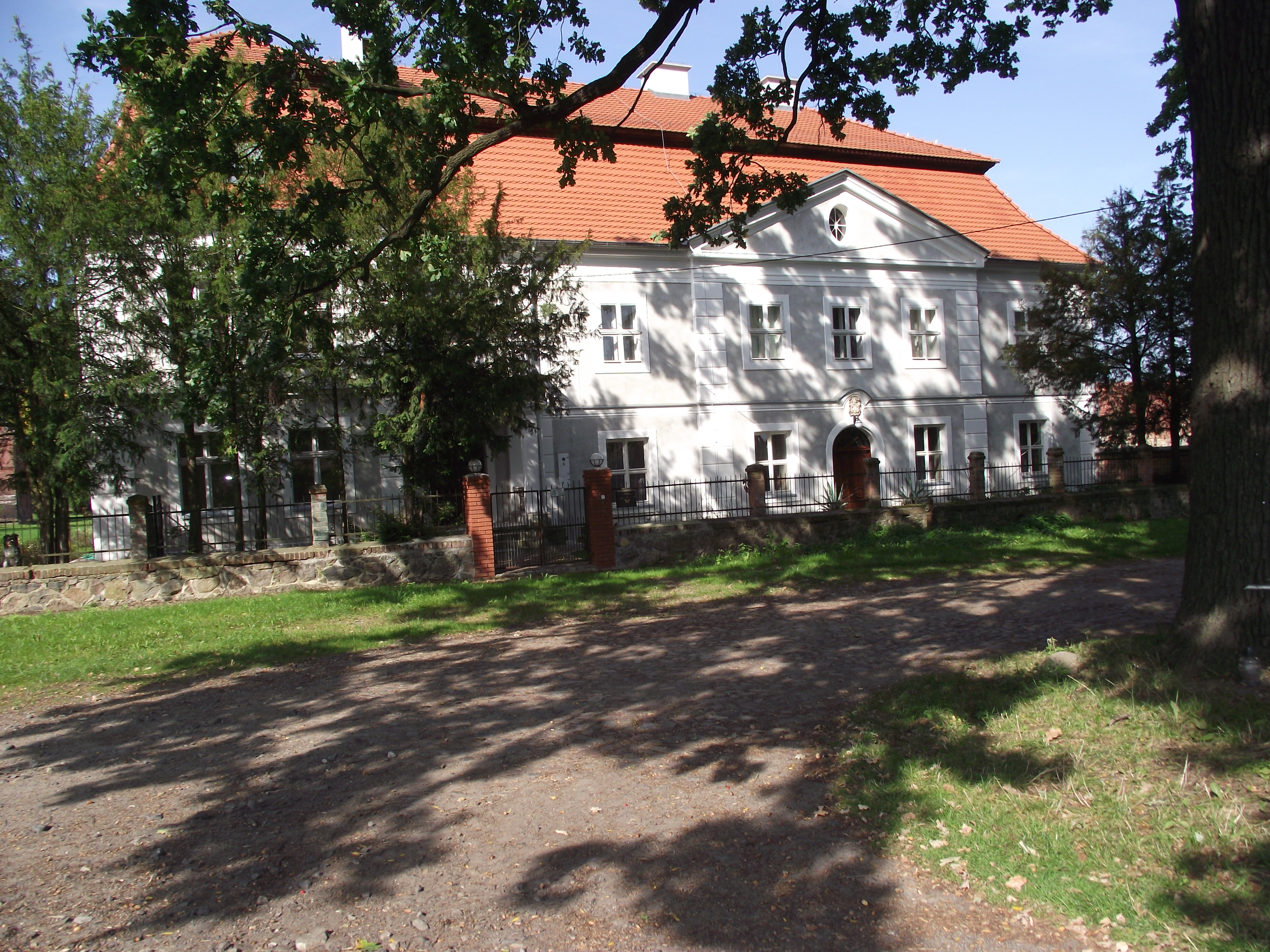
- Manor in Jabłonów

- Location within Poland
- Coordinates: 51°41′N 15°24′E
- Country: Poland
- Voivodeship: Lubusz
- County: Żagań
- Gmina: Brzeźnica

Population
  - Total: 661
- Website: http://jablonow.brzeznica.com.pl

Jabłonów [jaˈbwɔnuf] is a village in the administrative district of Gmina Brzeźnica, within Żagań County, Lubusz Voivodeship, in western Poland.
