= Kocin, Poland =

Kocin
- Village
- Location within Poland
- Coordinates: 51°39′N 15°26′E
- Country: Poland
- Voivodeship: Lubusz
- County: Żagań
- Gmina: Żagań

Kocin [ˈkɔt͡ɕin] is a village in the administrative district of Gmina Żagań, within Żagań County, Lubusz Voivodeship, in western Poland.
