= Puszczyków =

- Settlement
- Location within Poland
- Coordinates: 51°38′24″N 15°18′35″E
- Country: Poland
- Voivodeship: Lubusz
- County: Żagań
- Gmina: Żagań

Puszczyków [puʂˈt͡ʂɨkuf] is a settlement in the administrative district of Gmina Żagań, within Żagań County, Lubusz Voivodeship, in western Poland.
