= Przyborze =

Przyborze may refer to the following places:

- Przyborze, Lubusz Voivodeship (west Poland)
- Przyborze, Pomeranian Voivodeship (north Poland)
- Przyborze, West Pomeranian Voivodeship (north-west Poland)
