= Przylaski, Lubusz Voivodeship =

Przylaski
- Village
- Location within Poland
- Coordinates: 51°45′00″N 15°26′00″E
- Country: Poland
- Voivodeship: Lubusz
- County: Żagań
- Gmina: Brzeźnica
- Population: 226

Przylaski [pʂɨˈlaski] is a village in the administrative district of Gmina Brzeźnica, within Żagań County, Lubusz Voivodeship, in western Poland.
