= Tomaszowo =

- Village
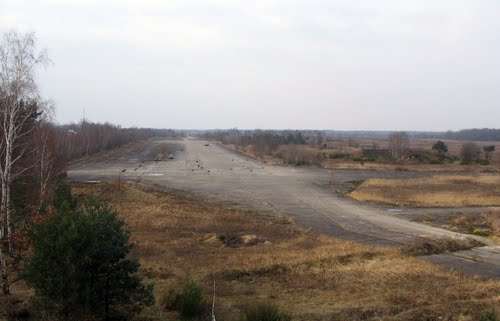

- Location within Poland
- Coordinates: 51°37′2″N 15°24′8″E
- Country: Poland
- Voivodeship: Lubusz
- County: Żagań
- Gmina: Żagań

Tomaszowo [tɔmaˈʂɔvɔ] is a village in the administrative district of Gmina Żagań, within Żagań County, Lubusz Voivodeship, in western Poland.
