= Pruszków, Lubusz Voivodeship =

Pruszków
- Village
- Location within Poland
- Coordinates: 51°32′N 15°25′E
- Country: Poland
- Voivodeship: Lubusz
- County: Żagań
- Gmina: Żagań

Pruszków [ˈpruʂkuf] is a village in the administrative district of Gmina Żagań, within Żagań County, Lubusz Voivodeship, in western Poland.
