= Dobre nad Kwisą =

- Village
- Location within Poland
- Coordinates: 51°31′41″N 15°22′6″E
- Country: Poland
- Voivodeship: Lubusz
- County: Żagań
- Gmina: Żagań

Dobre nad Kwisą [ˈdɔbrɛ ˌnat ˈkfisɔ̃] is a village in the administrative district of Gmina Żagań, within Żagań County, Lubusz Voivodeship, in western Poland.
