= Gorzupia Dolna =

- Village
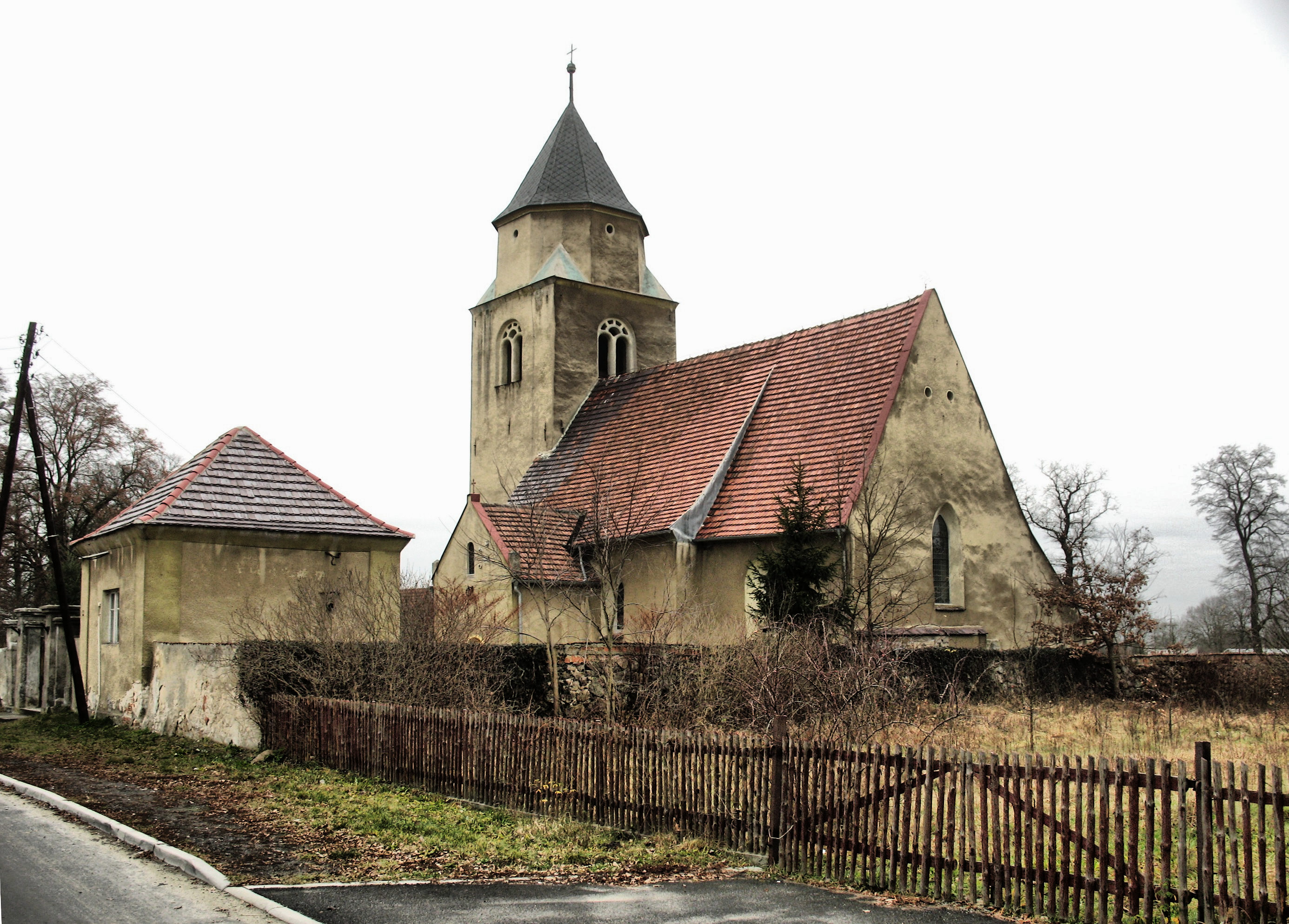
- An old church in the village

- Location within Poland
- Coordinates: 51°44′N 15°17′E
- Country: Poland
- Voivodeship: Lubusz
- County: Żagań
- Gmina: Żagań

Gorzupia Dolna [ɡɔˈʐupja ˈdɔlna] is a village in the administrative district of Gmina Żagań, within Żagań County, Lubusz Voivodeship, in western Poland.
