= Gmina Brzeźnica =

Gmina Brzeźnica may refer to either of the following rural administrative districts in Poland:

- Gmina Brzeźnica, Lesser Poland Voivodeship
- Gmina Brzeźnica, Lubusz Voivodeship
