= Trojanówka =

- Village
- Location within Poland
- Coordinates: 51°44′34″N 15°26′43″E
- Country: Poland
- Voivodeship: Lubusz
- County: Żagań
- Gmina: Brzeźnica

Trojanówka [trɔjaˈnufka] is a village in the administrative district of Gmina Brzeźnica, within Żagań County, Lubusz Voivodeship, in western Poland.
