= Chotków =

- Village
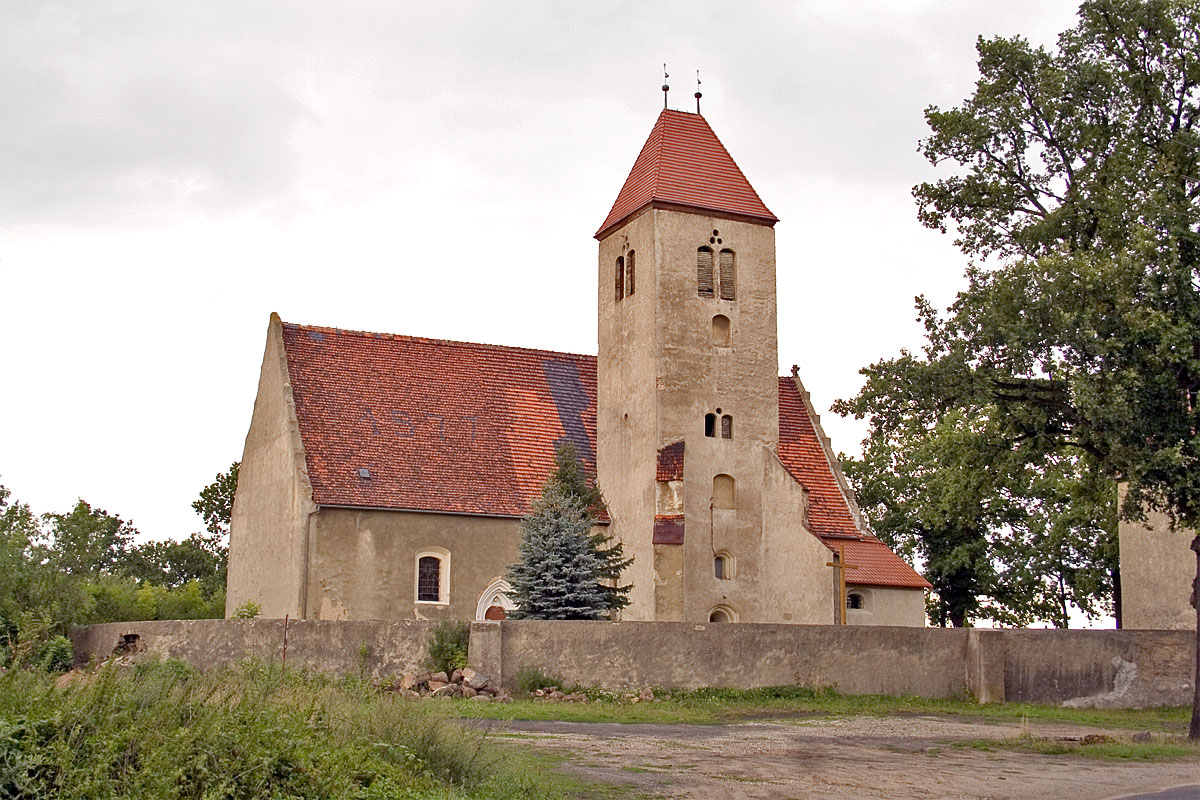
- Church of the Nativity of the Virgin Mary

- Location within Poland
- Coordinates: 51°42′N 15°28′E
- Country: Poland
- Voivodeship: Lubusz
- County: Żagań
- Gmina: Brzeźnica

Population
  - Total: 815
- Time zone: UTC+1 (CET)
  - Summer (DST): UTC+2 (CEST)
- Vehicle registration: FZG

Chotków [ˈxɔtkuf] is a village in the administrative district of Gmina Brzeźnica, within Żagań County, Lubusz Voivodeship, in western Poland.

Two Polish citizens were murdered by Nazi Germany in the village during World War II.
