= Jelenin, Lubusz Voivodeship =

Jelenin
- Village
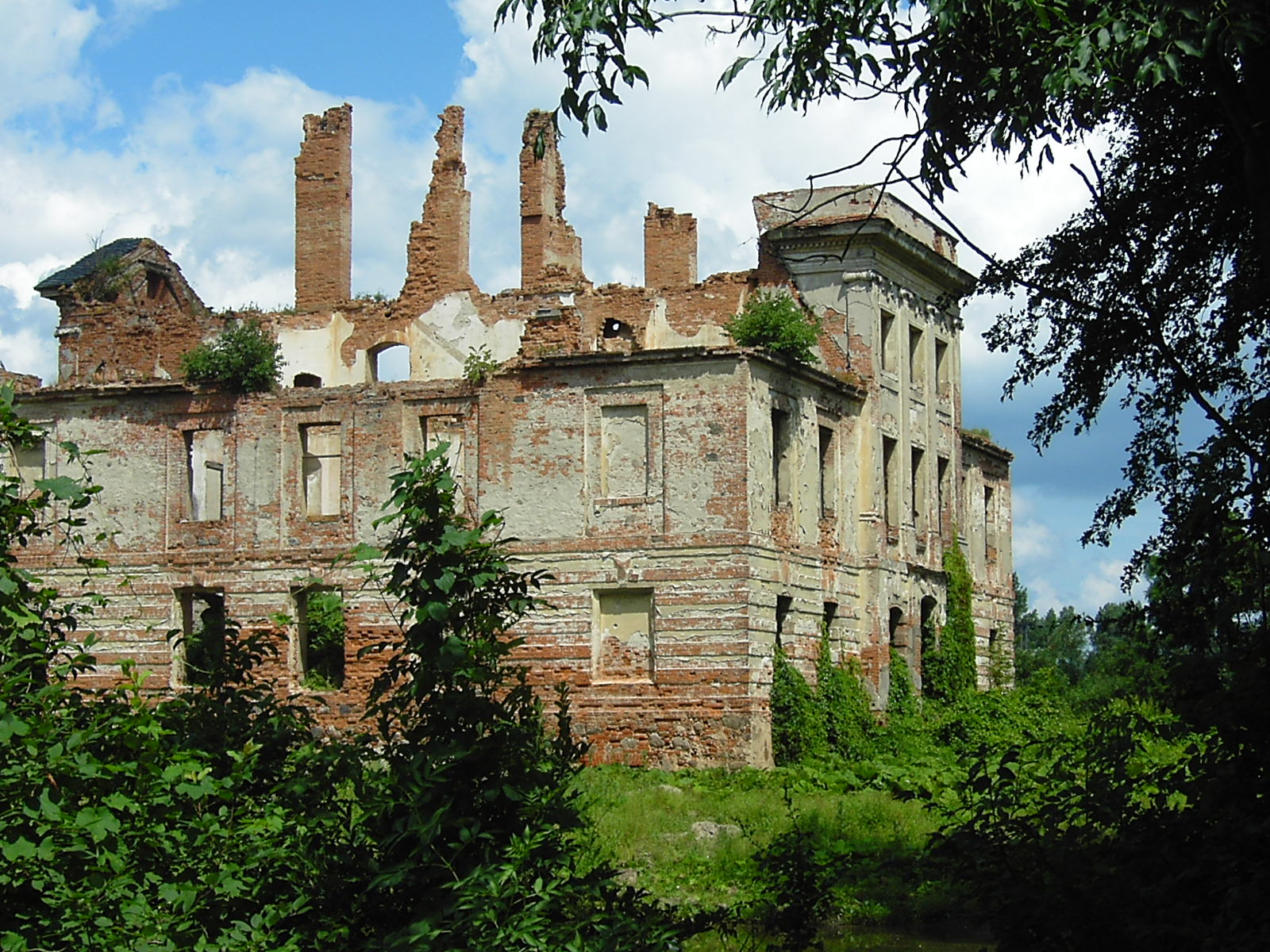
- Former palace

- Location within Poland
- Coordinates: 51°40′N 15°28′E
- Country: Poland
- Voivodeship: Lubusz
- County: Żagań
- Gmina: Żagań

Jelenin [jɛˈlɛnin] is a village in the administrative district of Gmina Żagań, within Żagań County, Lubusz Voivodeship, in western Poland.
