= Gorzupia, Lubusz Voivodeship =

Gorzupia
- Village
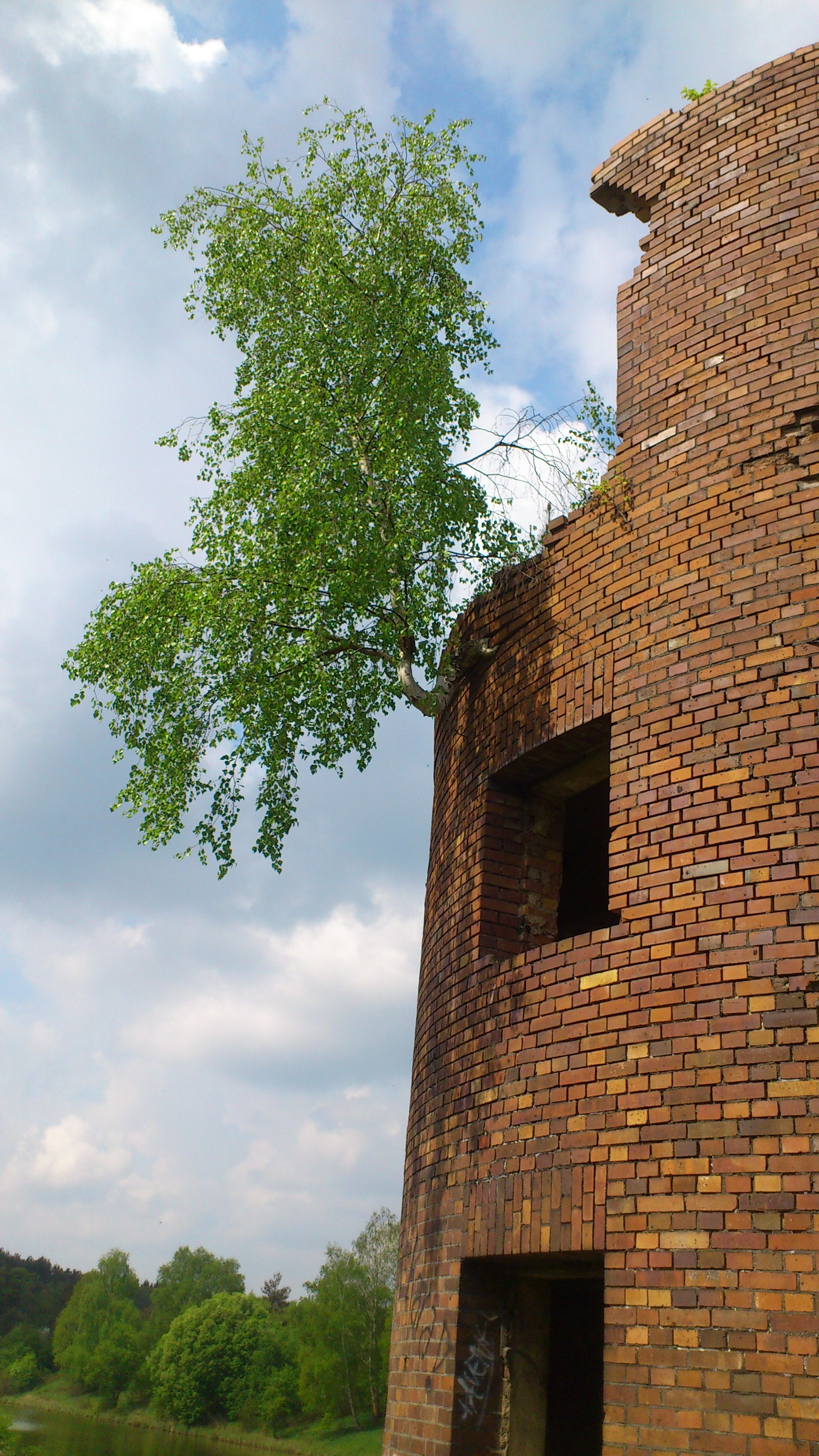

- Location within Poland
- Coordinates: 51°43′41″N 15°15′39″E
- Country: Poland
- Voivodeship: Lubusz
- County: Żagań
- Gmina: Żagań

Gorzupia [ɡɔˈʐupja] is a village in the administrative district of Gmina Żagań, within Żagań County, Lubusz Voivodeship, in western Poland.
