= Wichów =

- Village
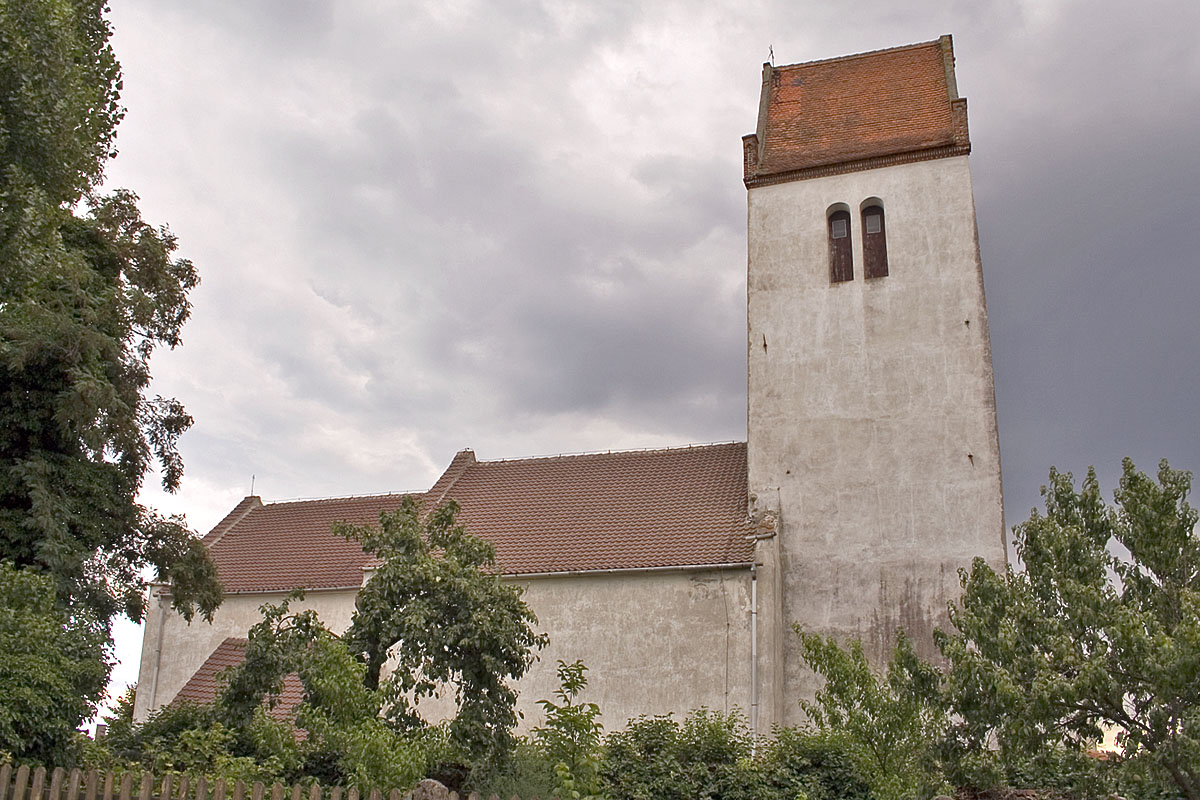
- Church of Saint Martin

- Location within Poland
- Coordinates: 51°44′N 15°28′E
- Country: Poland
- Voivodeship: Lubusz
- County: Żagań
- Gmina: Brzeźnica

Population
  - Total: 510

Wichów [ˈvixuf] is a village in the administrative district of Gmina Brzeźnica, within Żagań County, Lubusz Voivodeship, in western Poland.
