= Łozy =

Łozy may refer to several places:

- Łozy, Lubusz Voivodeship (west Poland)
- Łozy, Masovian Voivodeship (east-central Poland)
- Łozy, Warmian-Masurian Voivodeship (north Poland)
