= Marysin, Lubusz Voivodeship =

Marysin
- Village
- Location within Poland
- Coordinates: 51°38′14″N 15°20′45″E
- Country: Poland
- Voivodeship: Lubusz
- County: Żagań
- Gmina: Żagań

Marysin [maˈrɨɕin] is a village in the administrative district of Gmina Żagań, within Żagań County, Lubusz Voivodeship, in western Poland.
