= Stary Żagań =

- Village
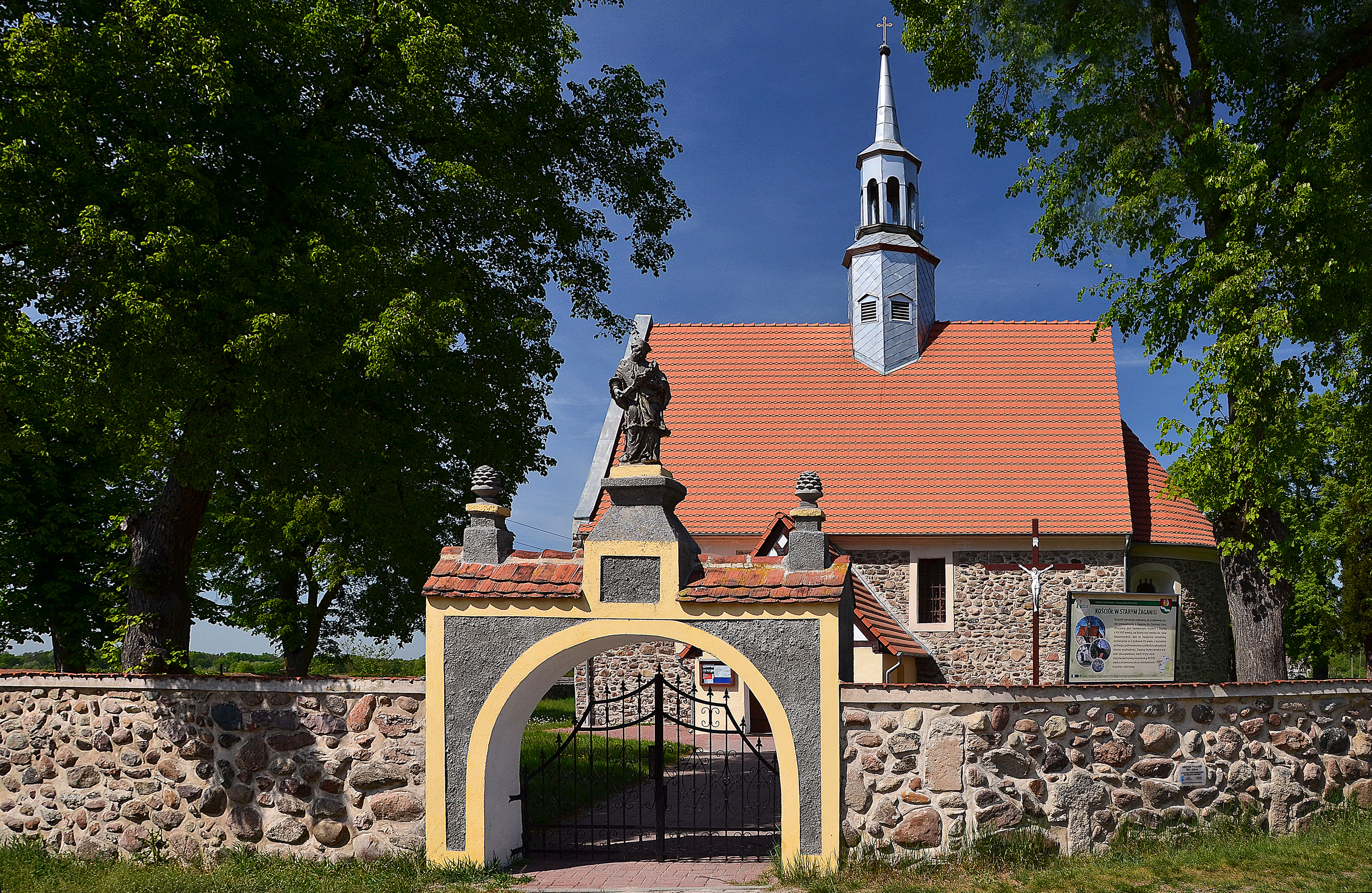
- Our Lady Queen of Poland church in Stary Żagań

- Location within Poland
- Coordinates: 51°39′N 15°19′E
- Country: Poland
- Voivodeship: Lubusz
- County: Żagań
- Gmina: Żagań

Population
  - Total: 180
- Time zone: UTC+1 (CET)
  - Summer (DST): UTC+2 (CEST)
- Postal code: 68-111
- Vehicle registration: FZG

Stary Żagań [ˈstarɨ ˈʐaɡaɲ] is a village in the administrative district of Gmina Żagań, within Żagań County, Lubusz Voivodeship, in western Poland.

== History ==
The village dates back to the Middle Ages. It was initially called Żagań, before the town of Żagań was established nearby by Polish monarch Bolesław IV the Curly in the 12th century. The village was named Stary Żagań ("Old Żagań") since. In 1284 it was mentioned in medieval documents under the Latin name Antiqus Zagan. The local church of Our Lady Queen of Poland dates back to the 12th century.

As a result of the fragmentation of Piast-ruled Kingdom of Poland, it formed part of the Duchy of Żagań, which remained ruled by the Polish Piast dynasty until 1472. Afterwards it was under Saxon, Bohemian, Austrian and Prussian suzerainty, and from 1871 to 1945 it was part of unified Germany. Following the defeat of Nazi Germany in World War II in 1945, the settlement became again part of Poland.
