= Wojsławice, Lubusz Voivodeship =

Wojsławice
- Village
- Location within Poland
- Coordinates: 51°46′25″N 15°25′39″E
- Country: Poland
- Voivodeship: Lubusz
- County: Żagań
- Gmina: Brzeźnica

Wojsławice [vɔi̯swaˈvit͡sɛ] is a village in the administrative district of Gmina Brzeźnica, within Żagań County, Lubusz Voivodeship, in western Poland.
