= Stanów =

- Village
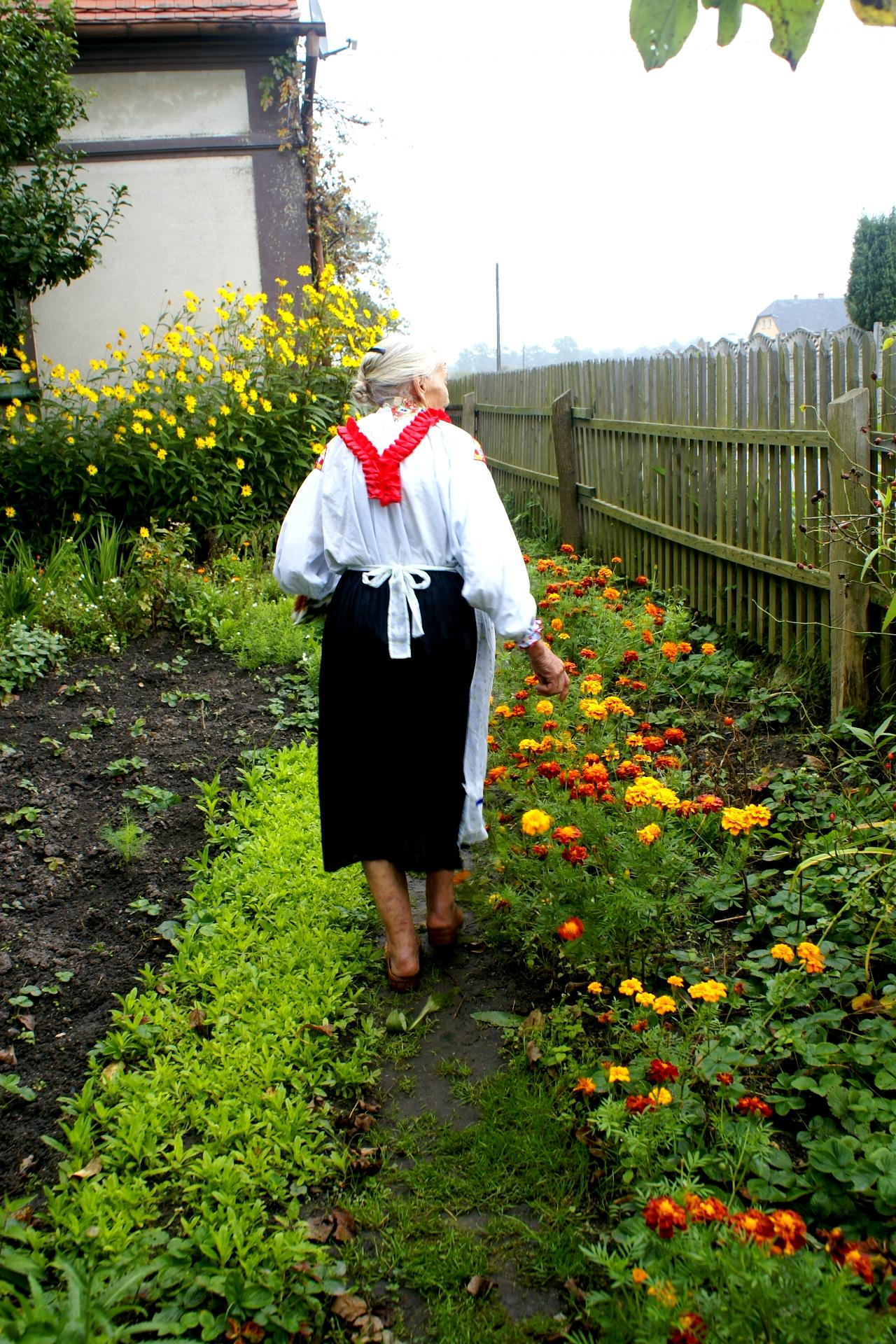

- Location within Poland
- Coordinates: 51°43′17″N 15°20′07″E
- Country: Poland
- Voivodeship: Lubusz
- County: Żagań
- Gmina: Brzeźnica

Population
  - Total: 251
- Time zone: UTC+1 (Central European Time)
- ISO 3166 code: POL

Stanów [ˈstanuf] is a village in the administrative district of Gmina Brzeźnica, within Żagań County, Lubusz Voivodeship, in western Poland.
