= Gryżyce, Lubusz Voivodeship =

Gryżyce
- Village
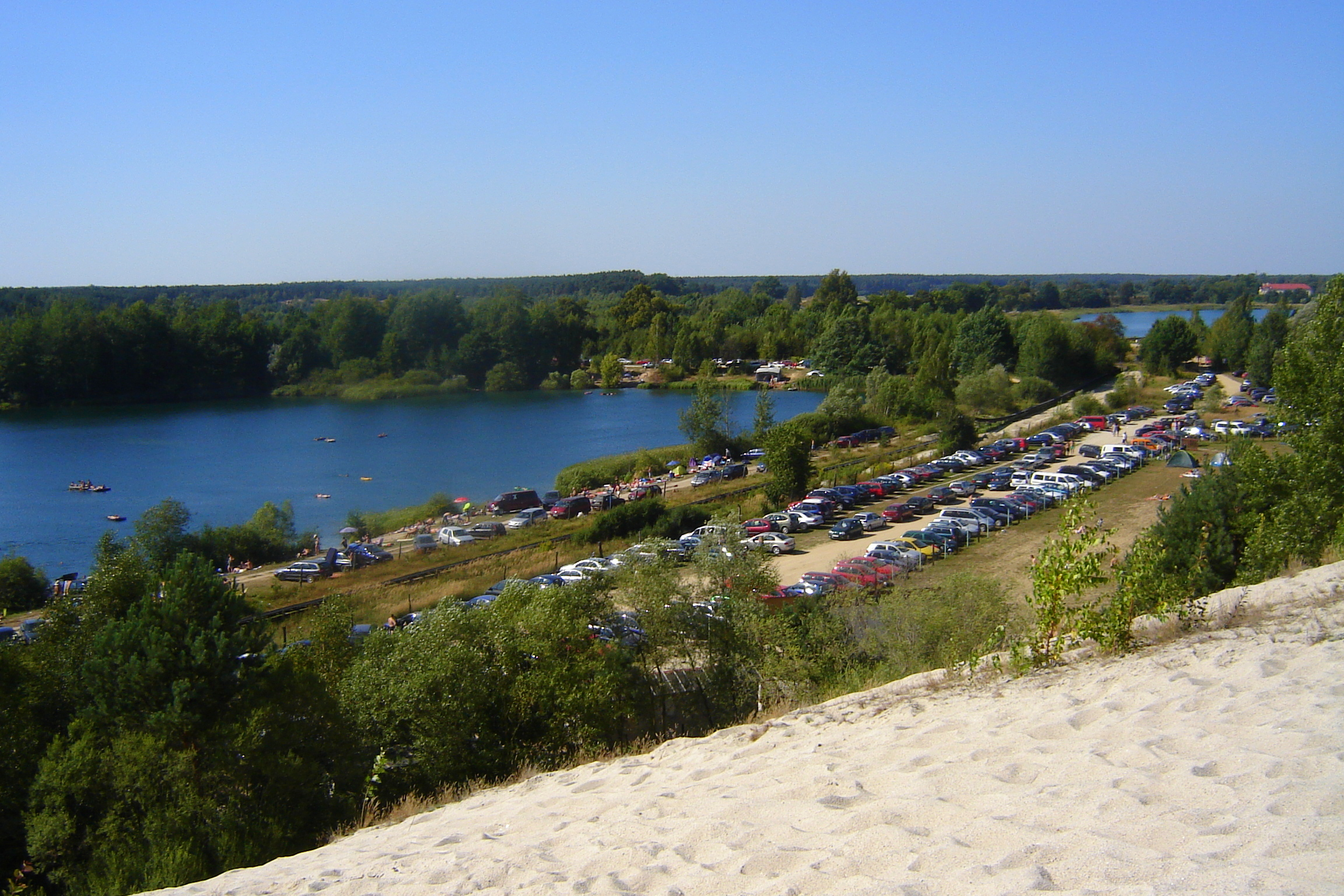

- Location within Poland
- Coordinates: 51°40′N 15°17′E
- Country: Poland
- Voivodeship: Lubusz
- County: Żagań
- Gmina: Żagań

Gryżyce [ɡrɨˈʐɨt͡sɛ] is a village in the administrative district of Gmina Żagań, within Żagań County, Lubusz Voivodeship, in western Poland.
