= Studnice, Poland =

Studnice
- Village
- Location within Poland
- Coordinates: 51°43′18″N 15°30′24″E
- Country: Poland
- Voivodeship: Lubusz
- County: Żagań
- Gmina: Brzeźnica

Studnice [studˈnit͡sɛ] is a village in the administrative district of Gmina Brzeźnica, within Żagań County, Lubusz Voivodeship, in western Poland.
