= Marcinów =

Marcinów may refer to the following villages in Poland:

- Marcinów, Greater Poland Voivodeship (west-central Poland)
- Marcinów, Kutno County in Łódź Voivodeship (central Poland)
- Marcinów, Pajęczno County in Łódź Voivodeship (central Poland)
- Marcinów, Poddębice County in Łódź Voivodeship (central Poland)
- Marcinów, Lower Silesian Voivodeship (south-west Poland)
- Marcinów, Lublin Voivodeship (east Poland)
- Marcinów, Żagań County in Lubusz Voivodeship (west Poland)
- Marcinów, Żary County in Lubusz Voivodeship (west Poland)
