= Karczówka, Lubusz Voivodeship =

Karczówka
- Village
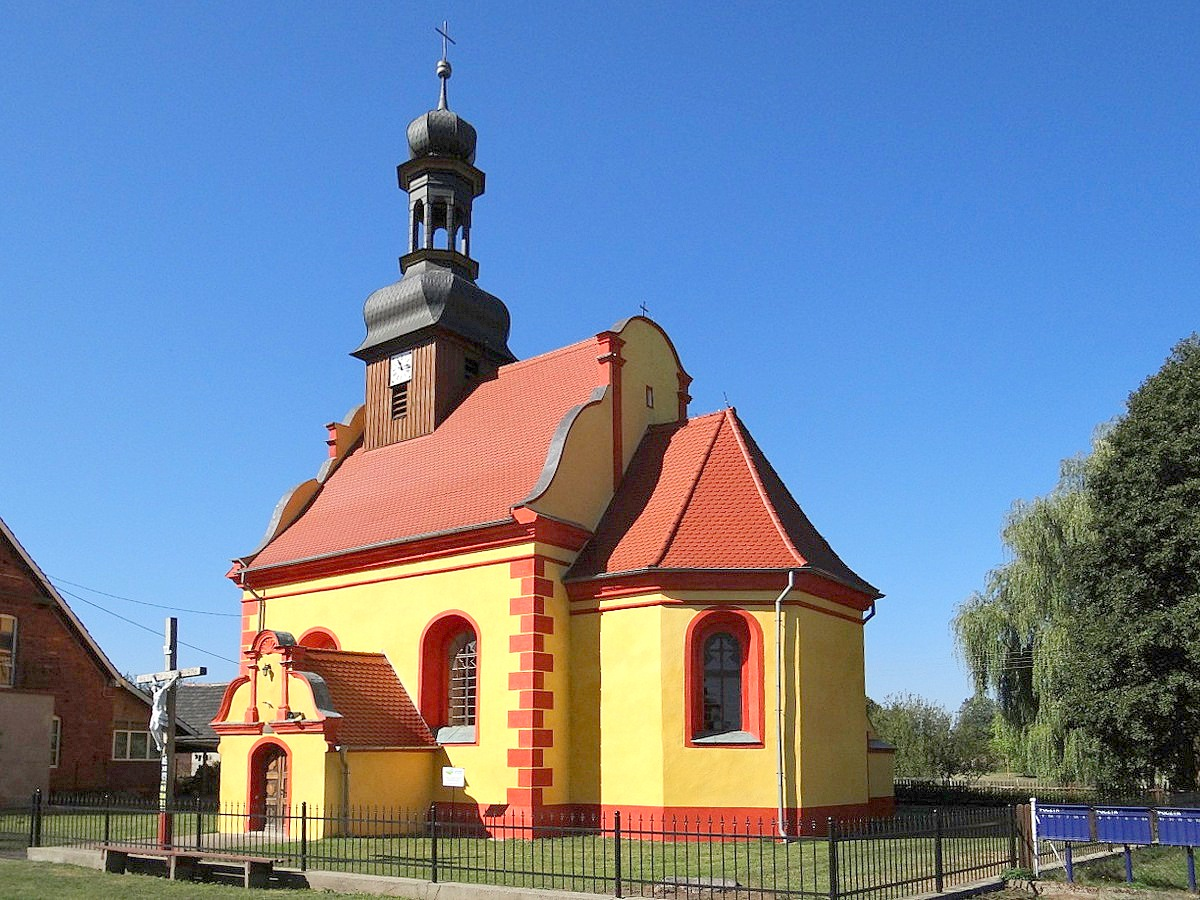
- Catholic church

- Location within Poland
- Coordinates: 51°41′N 15°22′E
- Country: Poland
- Voivodeship: Lubusz
- County: Żagań
- Gmina: Brzeźnica
- Population: 149

Karczówka [karˈt͡ʂufka] is a village in the administrative district of Gmina Brzeźnica, within Żagań County, Lubusz Voivodeship, in western Poland.
