= Rudawica =

- Village
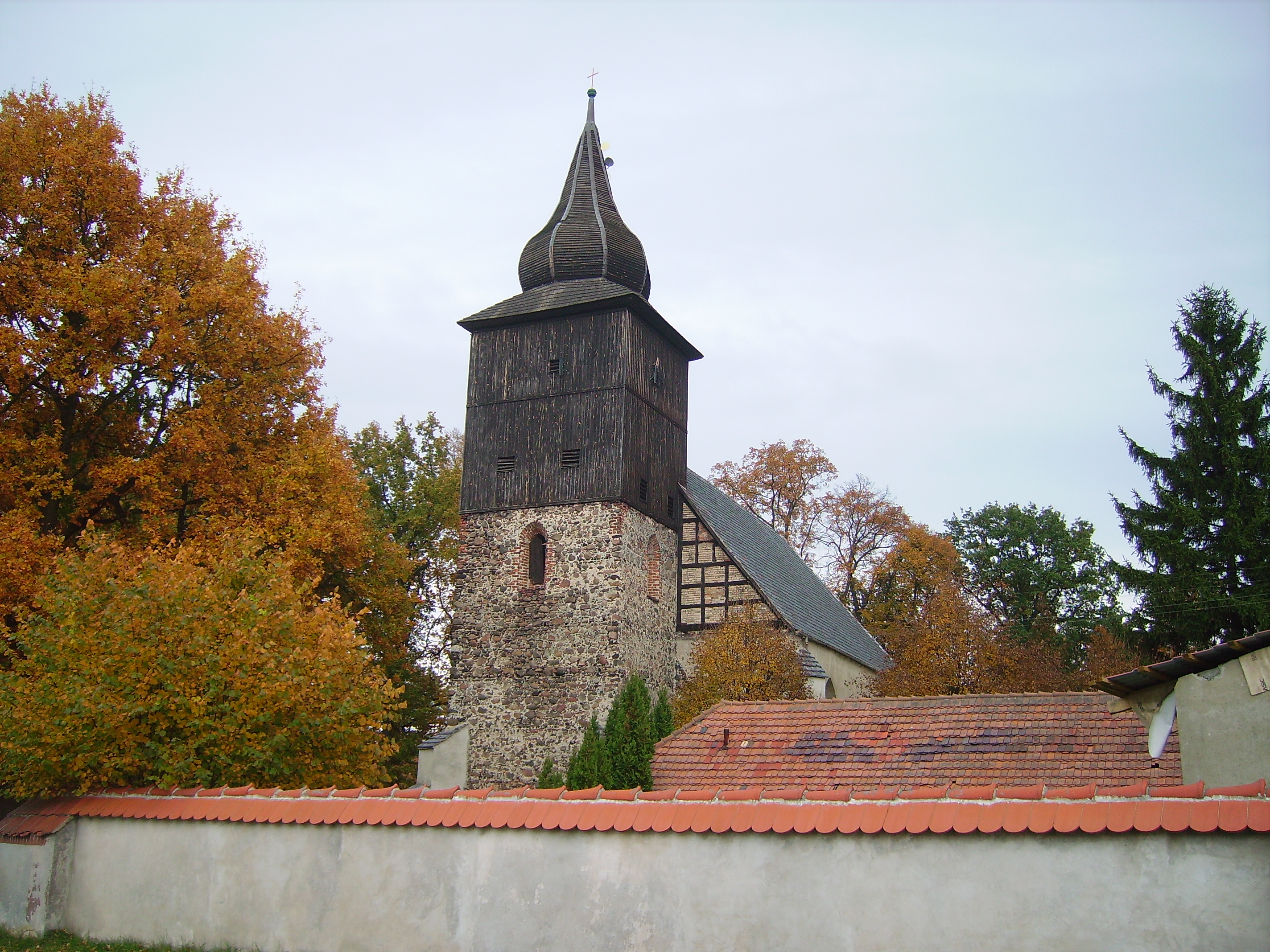
- Catholic church

- Location within Poland
- Coordinates: 51°32′N 15°23′E
- Country: Poland
- Voivodeship: Lubusz
- County: Żagań
- Gmina: Żagań

Rudawica [rudaˈvit͡sa] is a village in the administrative district of Gmina Żagań, within Żagań County, Lubusz Voivodeship, in western Poland.
