= Miodnica =

- Village
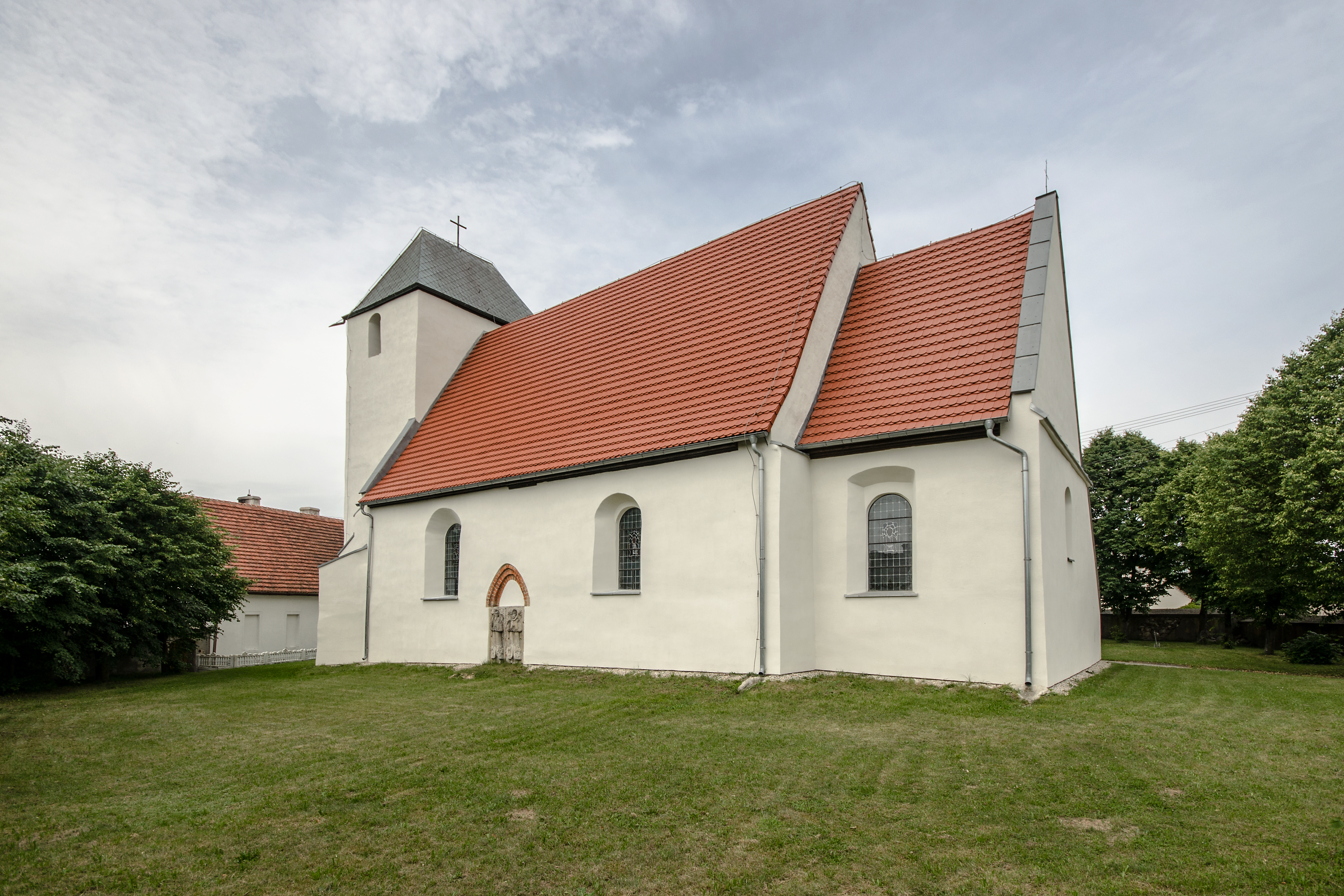
- Saint Sebastian church in Miodnica

- Location within Poland
- Coordinates: 51°41′43″N 15°18′03″E
- Country: Poland
- Voivodeship: Lubusz
- County: Żagań
- Gmina: Żagań
- Time zone: UTC+1 (CET)
  - Summer (DST): UTC+2 (CEST)
- Vehicle registration: FZG

Miodnica [mjɔdˈnit͡sa] is a village in the administrative district of Gmina Żagań, within Żagań County, Lubusz Voivodeship, in western Poland.

== Etymology ==
The name is of Polish origin, and comes from word miód, which means "honey".
