= Stara Kopernia =

- Village
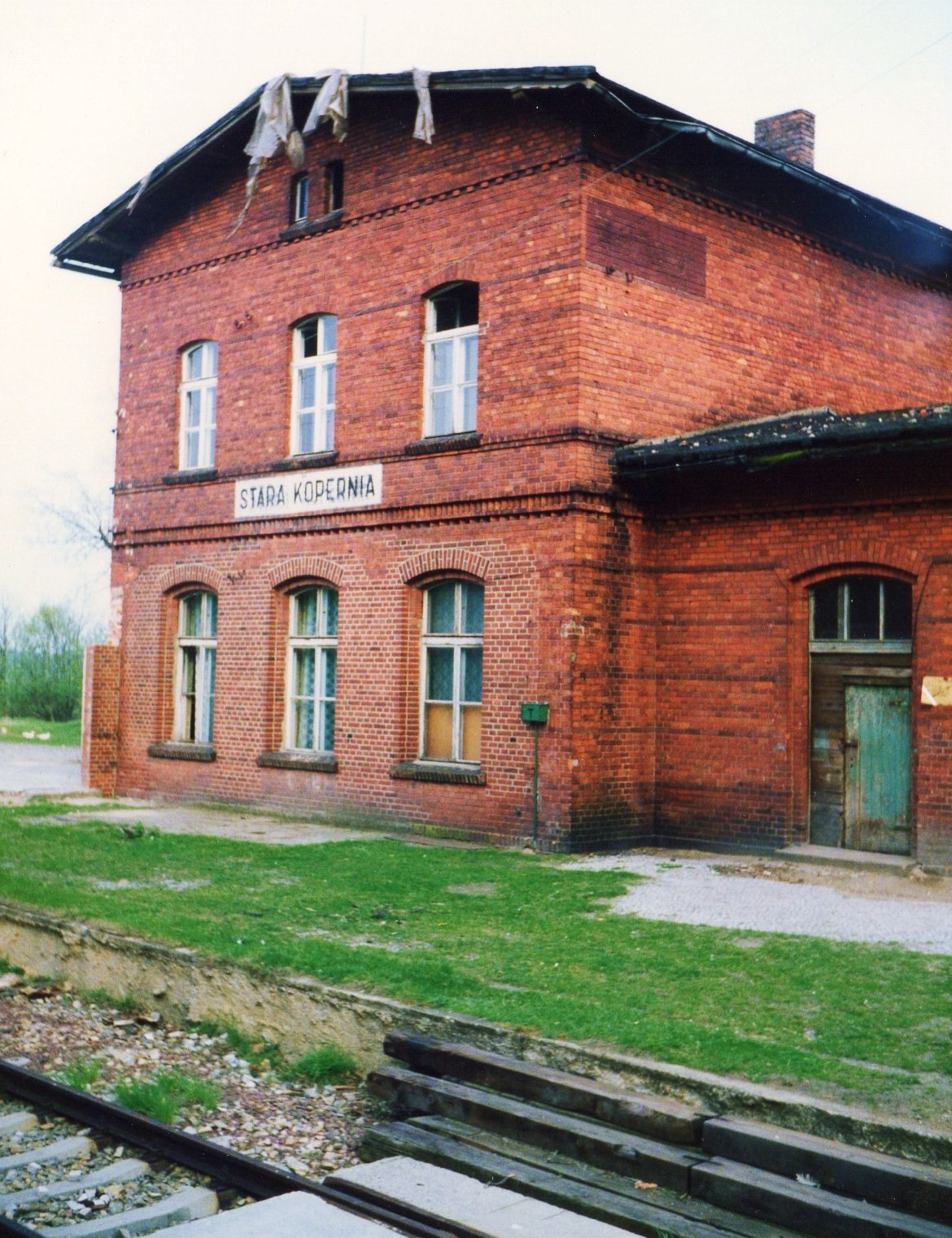
- Railway station

- Location within Poland
- Coordinates: 51°38′N 15°25′E
- Country: Poland
- Voivodeship: Lubusz
- County: Żagań
- Gmina: Żagań

Stara Kopernia [ˈstara kɔˈpɛrɲa] is a village in the administrative district of Gmina Żagań, within Żagań County, Lubusz Voivodeship, in western Poland.
