= Gmina Żagań =

Gmina Żagań Żagań Commune
- Gmina
- Flag Coat of arms
- Interactive map of Gmina Żagań
- Coordinates (Żagań): 51°37′N 15°19′E
- Country: Poland
- Voivodeship: Lubusz
- County: Żagań
- Seat: Żagań

Area
  - Total: 281.11 km^{2} (108.54 sq mi)

Population (2019-06-30)
  - Total: 7,324
  - Density: 26.05/km^{2} (67.48/sq mi)
- Website: http://www.gminazagan.pl/

Gmina Żagań is a rural gmina (administrative district) in Żagań County, Lubusz Voivodeship, in western Poland. Its seat is the town of Żagań, although the town is not part of the territory of the gmina.

The gmina covers an area of 281.11 square kilometres (108.5 sq mi), and as of 2019 its total population is 7,324.

== Villages ==
Gmina Żagań contains the villages and settlements of Bożnów, Bukowina Bobrzańska, Chrobrów, Dobre nad Kwisą, Dybów, Dzietrzychowice, Gorzupia, Gorzupia Dolna, Gryżyce, Jelenin, Kocin, Łozy, Marysin, Miodnica, Nieradza, Pożarów, Pruszków, Puszczyków, Rudawica, Stara Kopernia, Stary Żagań, Tomaszowo and Trzebów.

== Neighbouring gminas ==
Gmina Żagań is bordered by the town of Żagań and by the gminas of Brzeźnica, Iłowa, Małomice, Nowogród Bobrzański, Osiecznica, Szprotawa and Żary.
