= Marcinów, Żagań County =

Marcinów
- Village
- Location within Poland
- Coordinates: 51°44′14″N 15°25′26″E
- Country: Poland
- Voivodeship: Lubusz
- County: Żagań
- Gmina: Brzeźnica
- Population: 128 (2,005)

Marcinów [marˈt͡ɕinuf] is a village in the administrative district of Gmina Brzeźnica, within Żagań County, Lubusz Voivodeship, in western Poland.
