= Ilse Kokula =

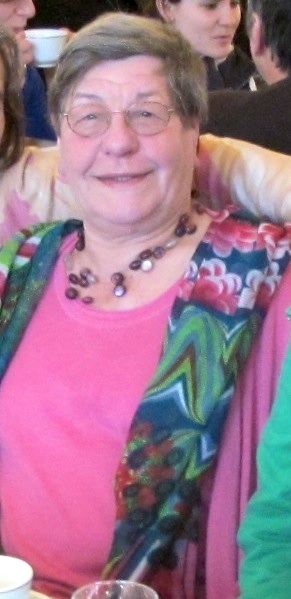
Ilse Kokula (2014)

Ilse Kokula (born January 13, 1944) is a German sociologist, educator, author and lesbian activist in the field of lesbian life. She was awarded the Order of Merit of the Federal Republic of Germany.

== Early years ==
Ilse Kokula was born in Żagań, Silesia in 1944, grew up in Franconia, and has been living in Berlin since 1971. As the eldest daughter with eight siblings, only one auxiliary job was planned for her, which is why she already had to fight for her apprenticeship as a cook. She sought and found support so that she could catch up on her schooling and study social work at the Higher Technical College. She successfully completed her studies in Bavaria in 1967.

== Career ==
After a few years as a social worker, Kokula attended the Berlin College of Education and enrolled in pedagogy. She wrote her diploma thesis about the lesbian group of the LAZ (Lesbian Action Center West Berlin), in which she herself was active. In the mid-1970s, when lesbians were socially still hushed up, Kokula published this work under the pseudonym "Ina Kuckuck" under the title "The fight against oppression" in the publishing house Frauenoffensive in Munich. She then worked in practice for several years before obtaining a doctorate in sociology at the University of Bremen in 1982. The result was two more books: Female Homosexuality around 1900 and Forms of Lesbian Subculture. In 1985, Kokula was appointed by the University of Utrecht as the first visiting scholar for "social history and socialization of lesbian women" on a special chair and thus received the title of professor.

She taught, learned and made many contacts and then worked for several years as a freelance researcher and lecturer, until she became an equal opportunity officer of the Gender Equality Department of the Senate of Berlin in West Berlin in the year of the fall of the Berlin Wall (1989).

There, she presented topics at conferences, for discussion. such as the questions of persecution of homosexuals in Nazi Germany and the Holocaust should be commemorated, how city authorities could promote lesbian and gay emancipation, or what history and perspectives lesbians and gays would have in the new federal states (formerly GDR). These and many other discussions were published in the "Lesbian-Gay Emancipation Documents" section of the Homosexual Lifestyles Unit (edited by the Senate Department for Youth and Family, Berlin).

For more than four decades, Kokula has been connecting different levels: as a researcher, she published pioneering works on the present and history of lesbian women as early as the 1970s and early 1980s, on the basis of which younger researchers in history, sociology, psychology and literary studies could build. Kokula has worked as a political fighter in the women and lesbian movement (including women's group of homosexual action West Berlin, short: HAW), later Lesbian Action Center West Berlin, in the journals UKZ – "Our little newspaper" and the "Swiss Lesbian Front"). She has also maintained lesbian- gay co-operation (among other things the lesbian-gay trade union group of the ÖTV established, and at the exhibition "Eldorado: Homosexual women and men in Berlin 1850–1950", which took place in 1984 in Berlin.

Kokula connected many lesbians from East and West, from the Netherlands, Austria, Switzerland and Germany before the fall of the Berlin Wall in 1989 and thereafter. As the first equal opportunities officer in the "Department for same-sex lifestyle of the Berlin Senate" has brought them from 1989 to 1996 numerous topics through meetings and publications in the social debate and in the "Community Lesbian and gay politics" of the district office Berlin-Charlottenburg Expert participated.

Kokula was a committed member of the women's and lesbian movement (including the founding founder of the Foundation for the Archive of the German Women's Movement ). As a lesbian researcher and emancipation fighter, the role of a gender equality officer in the administration was a source of tension inside and outside the institutions and stakeholders. After seven years, Ilse Kokula left this post and moved her field of activity into the field of youth protection.

Since her retirement in 2004, she has been working as a volunteer at the Frieda Women's Center in Berlin, where she regularly organizes lectures and discussions on various aspects of lesbian life.

== Works ==
As author

- Der Kampf gegen Unterdrückung. Frauenoffensive, Munich 1975. (using pseudonym: Ina Kuckuck). (in German)
- Weibliche Homosexualität um 1900 in zeitgenössischen Dokumenten. Frauenoffensive, Munich 1981. (in German)
- Formen lesbischer Subkultur. Rosa Winkel Verlag, Berlin 1983. (in German)
- Jahre des Glücks, Jahre des Leids – Gespräche mit älteren lesbischen Frauen. Frühlings Erwachen, Kiel 1986. (in German)
- Wir leiden nicht mehr, sondern sind gelitten! Lesbisch leben in Deutschland. Kiepenheuer und Witsch, Köln 1987. (in German)
- Die Welt gehört uns doch! Zusammenschluss lesbischer Frauen in der Schweiz der 30er Jahre (Mitautorin: Ulrike Böhmer). eFeF, Zürich/ Bern 1991. ISBN 978-3-905493-17-7 (in German)
- Manfred Baumgardt, Ralf Dose, Manfred Herzer, Hans-Günter Klein, Ilse Kokula, Gesa Lindemann: Magnus Hirschfeld – Leben und Werk. Ausstellungskatalog. Westberlin: Rosa Winkel, 1985 (Schriftenreihe der Magnus-Hirschfeld-Gesellschaft 3). (in German)
  - 2. erw. Aufl. Mit einem Nachwort von Ralf Dose. Hamburg: von Bockel, 1992. (Schriftenreihe der Magnus-Hirschfeld-Gesellschaft 6). (in German)

As editor

- "How informed is the administration?" Senate Department for School, Youth and Sports, Department for Same-Sex Lifestyles, Berlin 1996. (in German)
- "Commemorate the homosexual Nazi victims. 1st ed." Senate Department for Youth and Family, Department for Same-Sex Lifestyles Berlin 1995. (in German)
- "Lesbians, gays, partnerships. 1st ed." Senate Department for Youth and Family, Department for Same-Sex Lifestyles Berlin 1994. (in German)
- "Aspects of lesbian and gay emancipation in local governments." Senate Administration for Women, Youth and Family Berlin 1991. (in German)
- "History and perspectives of lesbians and gays in the new federal states." Senate Department for Youth and Family Berlin 1991. (in German)
