= Pożarów, Lubusz Voivodeship =

Pożarów
- Village
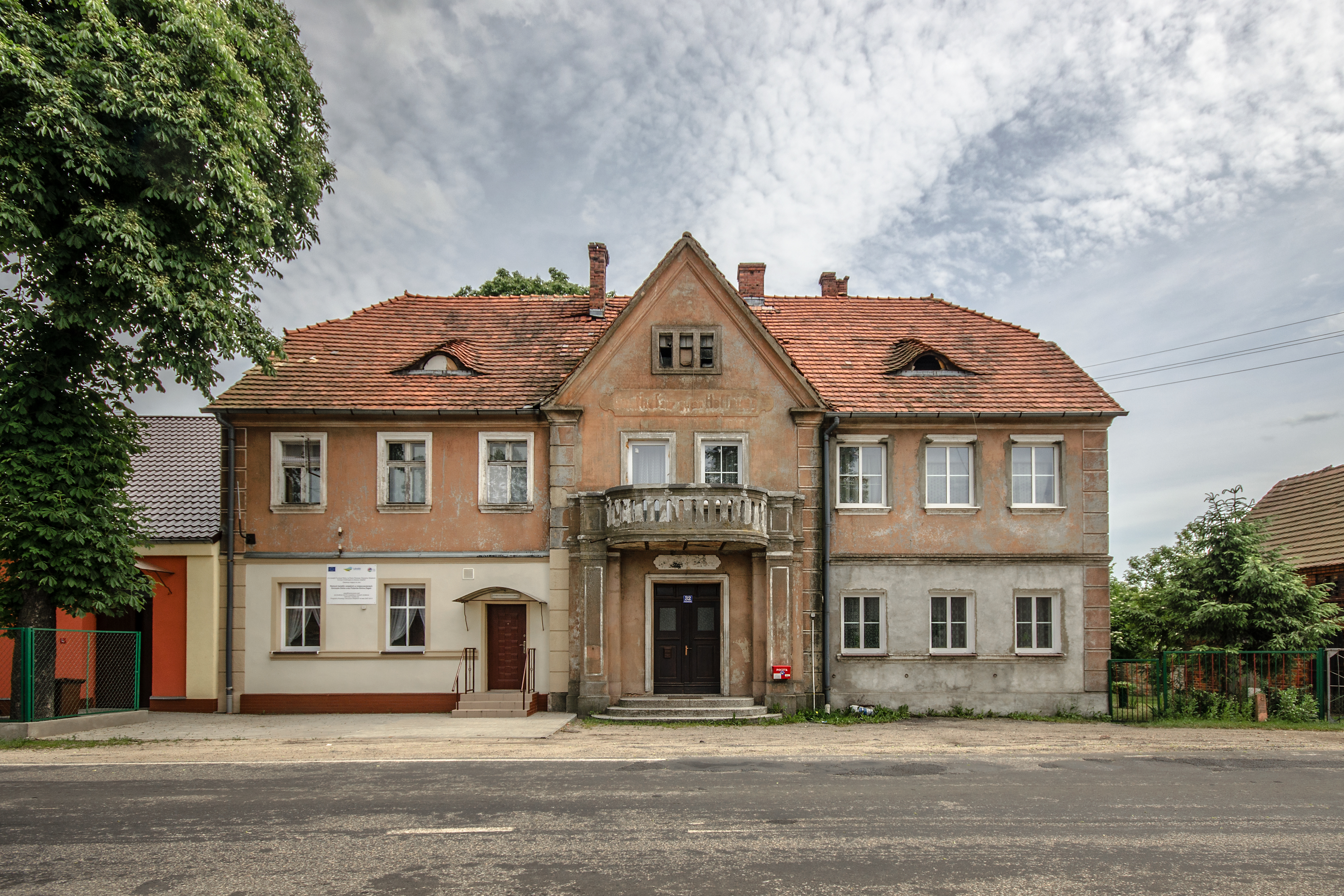

- Location within Poland
- Coordinates: 51°39′N 15°19′E
- Country: Poland
- Voivodeship: Lubusz
- County: Żagań
- Gmina: Żagań

Pożarów [pɔˈʐaruf] is a village in the administrative district of Gmina Żagań, within Żagań County, Lubusz Voivodeship, in western Poland.
