= Gmina Brzeźnica, Lubusz Voivodeship =

Gmina Brzeźnica Brzeźnica Commune
- Gmina
- Flag Coat of arms
- Interactive map of Gmina Brzeźnica
- Coordinates (Brzeźnica): 51°42′56″N 15°23′28″E
- Country: Poland
- Voivodeship: Lubusz
- County: Żagań
- Seat: Brzeźnica

Area
  - Total: 122.23 km^{2} (47.19 sq mi)

Population (2019-06-30)
  - Total: 3,759
  - Density: 30.75/km^{2} (79.65/sq mi)
- Website: http://www.brzeznica.com.pl/

Gmina Brzeźnica is a rural gmina (administrative district) in Żagań County, Lubusz Voivodeship, in western Poland. Its seat is the village of Brzeźnica, which lies approximately 13 kilometres (8 mi) north-east of Żagań and 27 km (17 mi) south of Zielona Góra.

The gmina covers an area of 122.23 square kilometres (47.2 sq mi), and as of 2019 its total population is 3,759.

== Villages ==
Gmina Brzeźnica contains the villages and settlements of Brzeźnica, Chotków, Jabłonów, Karczówka, Marcinów, Przyborze, Przylaski, Stanów, Studnice, Trojanówka, Wichów, Wojsławice and Wrzesiny.

== Neighbouring gminas ==
Gmina Brzeźnica is bordered by the gminas of Kożuchów, Nowogród Bobrzański and Żagań.
