= Brzeźnica, Żagań County =

Brzeźnica
- Village
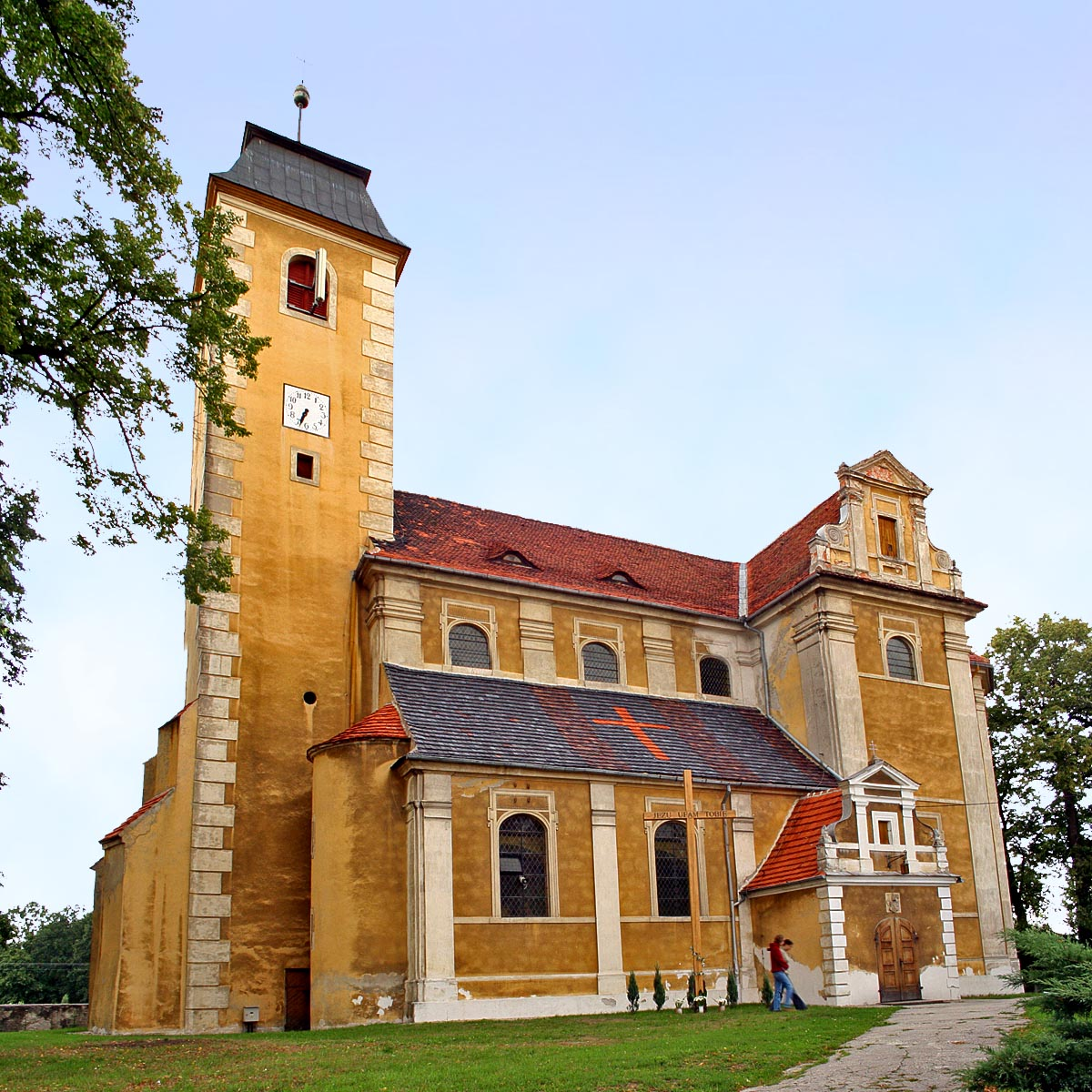
- Church of Saint Mary Magdalene

- Location within Poland
- Coordinates: 51°42′56″N 15°23′28″E
- Country: Poland
- Voivodeship: Lubusz
- County: Żagań
- Gmina: Brzeźnica

Population
  - Total: 875

Brzeźnica [bʐɛʑˈnit͡sa] is a village in Żagań County, Lubusz Voivodeship, in western Poland. It is the seat of the gmina (administrative district) called Gmina Brzeźnica.
