= Żagań =

Town in western Poland

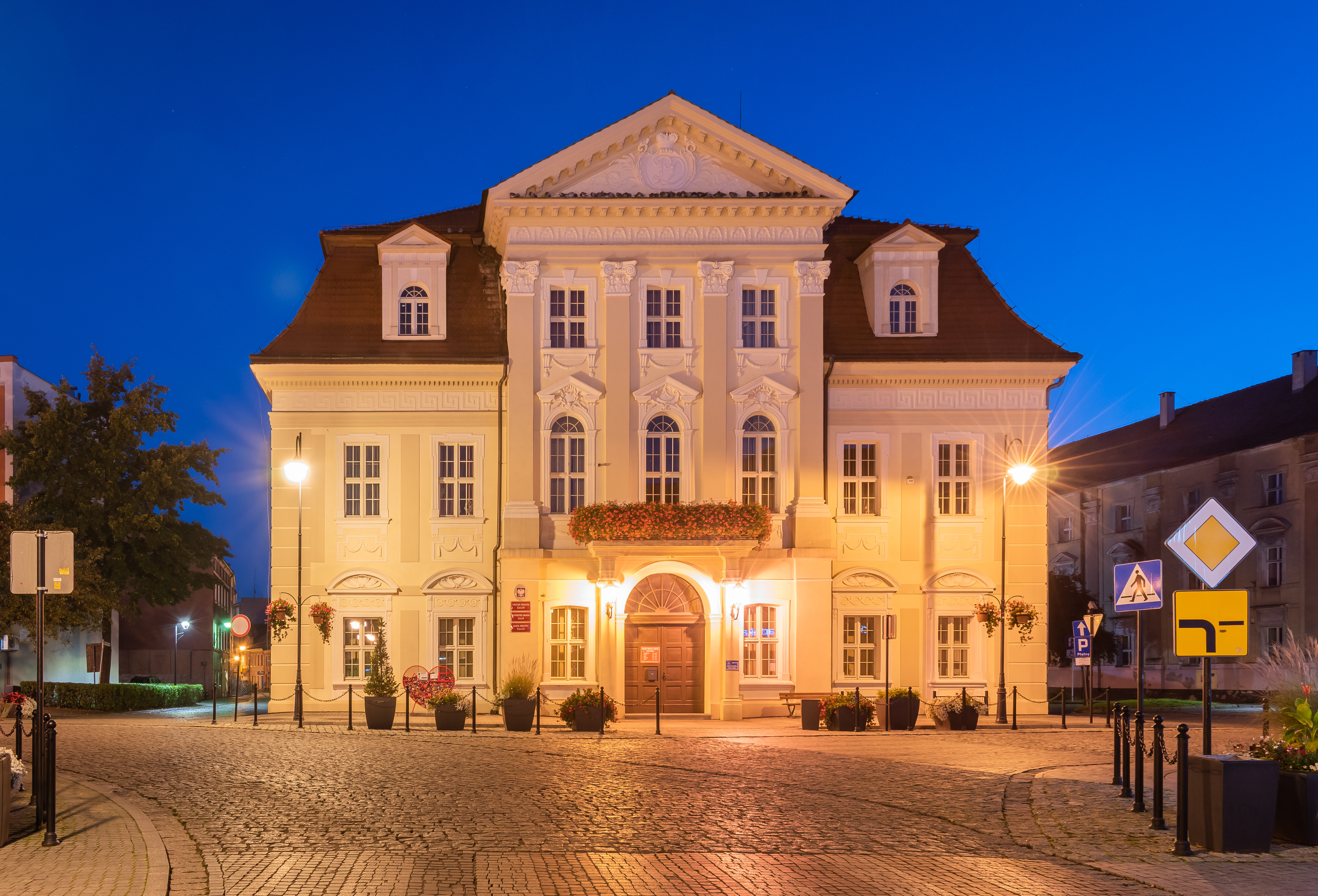
- Current Town Hall

- Flag Coat of arms

- Location within Poland
- Coordinates: 51°37′N 15°19′E
- Country: Poland
- Voivodeship: Lubusz
- County: Żagań
- Gmina: Żagań (urban gmina)
- Established: 12th century
- First mentioned: 1202
- Town rights: between 1248 and 1260

Government
  - Mayor: Sławomir Kowal

Area
  - Total: 39.92 km^{2} (15.41 sq mi)

Population (2024-12-31)
  - Total: 23,136
  - Density: 579.6/km^{2} (1,501/sq mi)
- Time zone: UTC+1 (CET)
  - Summer (DST): UTC+2 (CEST)
- Postal code: 68-100 to 68-103
- Area code: +48 68
- Car plates: FZG
- Website: urzadmiasta.zagan.pl

Żagań [ˈʐaɡaɲ] (French and German: Sagan, Latin: Saganum) is a town in western Poland, on the Bóbr river, with 23,136 inhabitants (2024), and the capital of Żagań County in the Lubusz Voivodeship, located in the historic region of Lower Silesia.

Founded in the 12th century by Polish monarch Bolesław IV the Curly, Żagań was the capital of an eponymous principality from 1274 to 1935. The main sights are the former Augustinian Monastery, one of the burial sites of the Piast dynasty, listed as a Historic Monument of Poland, the Ducal Palace and Park ensemble and the POW Camps Museum, located at the site of German-operated WWII prisoner-of-war camps for over 60,000 Allied soldiers of various nationalities, where the Great Escape took place.

The town hosts the Polish 11th Armoured Cavalry Division. An American Armored Brigade Combat Team is constantly rotated through the town under Operation Atlantic Resolve.

== Etymology ==
The town's name probably means "place of the burnt forest" (Polish: żegać, żagiew), probably referring to the burning of primeval forest by early settlers. If this is correct, it is consistent with the names of nearby places Żary, Zgorzelec, and Pożarów.

== Geography ==
Żagań is located roughly halfway between Cottbus and Wrocław, approximately 100 meters above sea level and at the centre of the Żagań administrative district. It is about 100 km (62 mi) north of the Polish border with the Czech Republic, and approximately 40 km (25 mi) to the east of Poland's border with Germany. The rural district of Żagań surrounds the town on its northern, eastern and southern sides. Iłowa lies to the south-west and the rural district of Żary is to the north-west. The Rivers Bóbr and Kwisa meet up just outside the town on its south-eastern side.

== History ==
=== Polish Piast dynasty ===
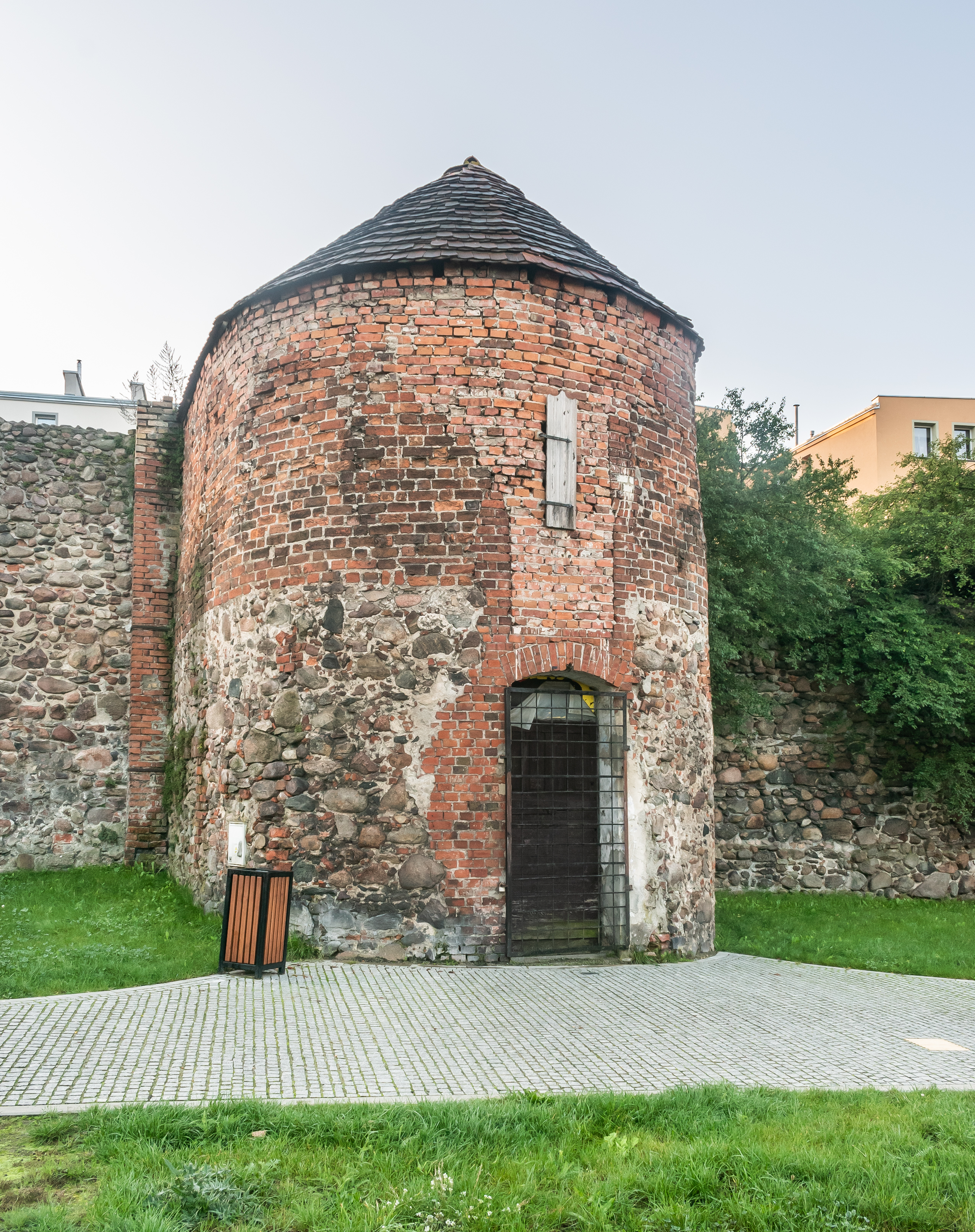
Medieval town walls

The area formed part of Poland after the creation of the state in the 10th century. Żagań was founded in the 12th century by Polish monarch Bolesław IV the Curly near an old settlement of the same name, which name was then changed to Stary Żagań ("Old Żagań"). The name comes from the Old Polish word zagon. It was first mentioned in a 1202 deed, when it belonged to the Duchy of Silesia under the rule of the Piast duke Henry I the Bearded, within fragmented Poland. In 1251, it became part of the newly created Duchy of Głogów under Henry's grandson Konrad I. Duke Konrad I granted Żagań town rights between 1248 and 1260. The town developed wealth from development of mining, and attracted German settlers from the west.

After Konrad's death in 1274, his heirs again divided the duchy and the castle of Żagań became the residence of his youngest son Przemko of Ścinawa, Duke of Żagań from 1278, who established a monastery of the Augustinian Canons here. Thus the Duchy of Żagań came into the existence. In 1284, he swapped his estates for the Duchy of Ścinawa and was succeeded by his elder brother Konrad II the Hunchback. When Konrad II died in 1304, all the former Głogów estates were reunified under his surviving brother Henry III.

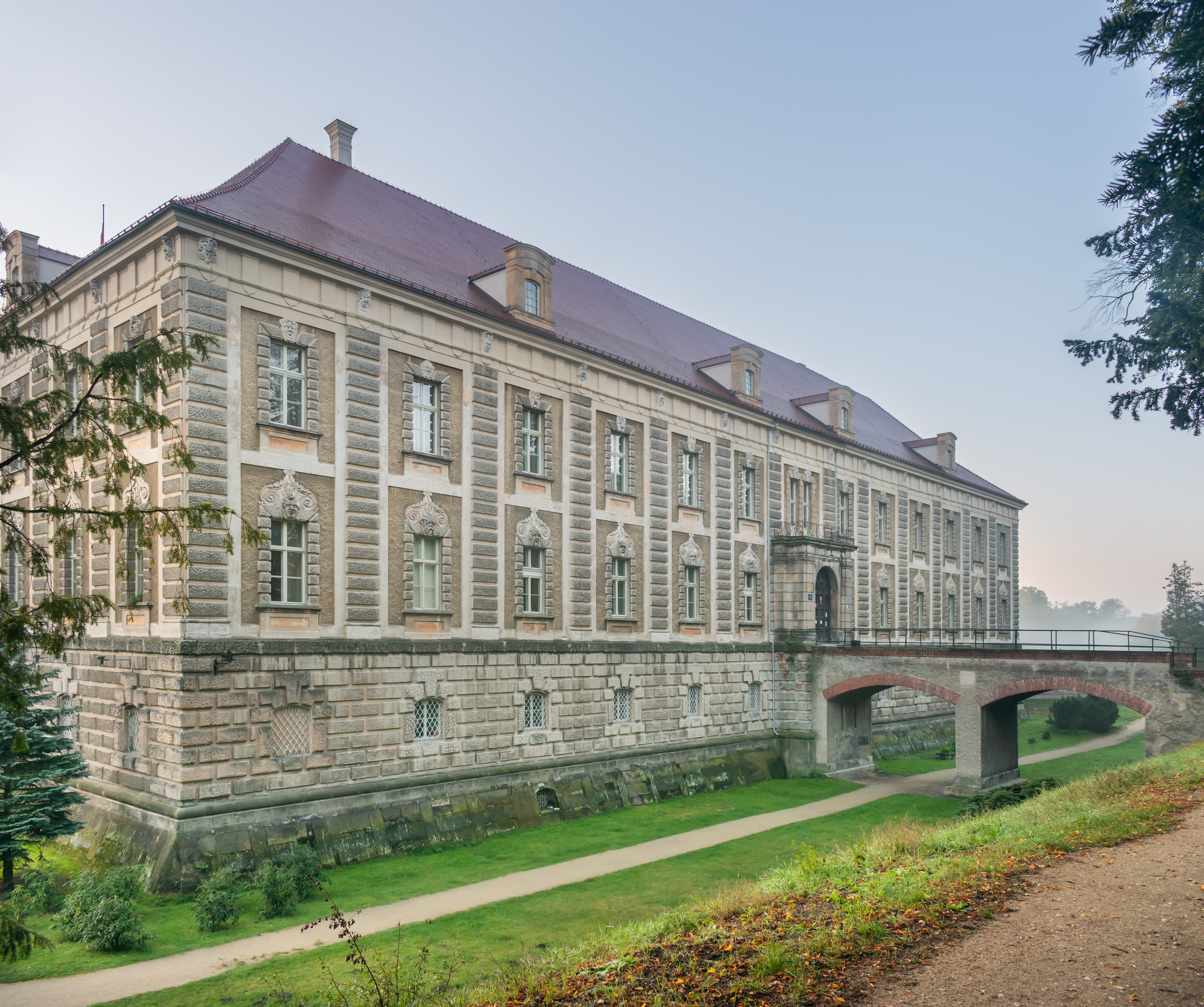
Żagań Palace

In 1309, Henry III of Głogów was succeeded by his eldest son Henry IV the Faithful, who in 1321 again had to divide the duchy with his younger brothers. He ceded Głogów to Przemko II and retired to Żagań, which again became the capital of a duchy in its own right. In 1329, all the sons of Henry III of Głogów became vassals of John of Luxembourg, the King of Bohemia - with the exception of Przemko II who died suddenly two years later. When in 1393 Henry VI the Elder, grandson of Henry IV, died without issue, the estates were again reunified with Głogów until in 1412 Jan I, the eldest son of Duke Henry VIII the Sparrow, became the sole ruler of the Żagań duchy.

=== Saxon, Habsburg and Prussian rule ===
After a fierce battle for the inheritance, Jan II the Mad, son of Jan I, finally sold it to Duke Albert III of Saxony from the House of Wettin, thus ending the centuries-long Piast rule.

In 1549, Elector Maurice of Saxony ceded Sagan to the Bohemian king Ferdinand I of Habsburg. Emperor Ferdinand II of Habsburg allotted the fief to Albrecht von Wallenstein, his supreme commander in the Thirty Years' War in 1627. It then passed to the illustrious Bohemian family of Lobkowicz, who had the Baroque Żagań Palace erected. One of two main routes connecting Warsaw and Dresden ran through the town in the 18th century and Kings Augustus II the Strong and Augustus III of Poland traveled that route numerous times. After the First Silesian War of 1742, Żagań became part of Prussia. It was part of the Province of Silesia of Prussia and after 1871 Germany. In the 19th century Żagań was still a significant Polish center.

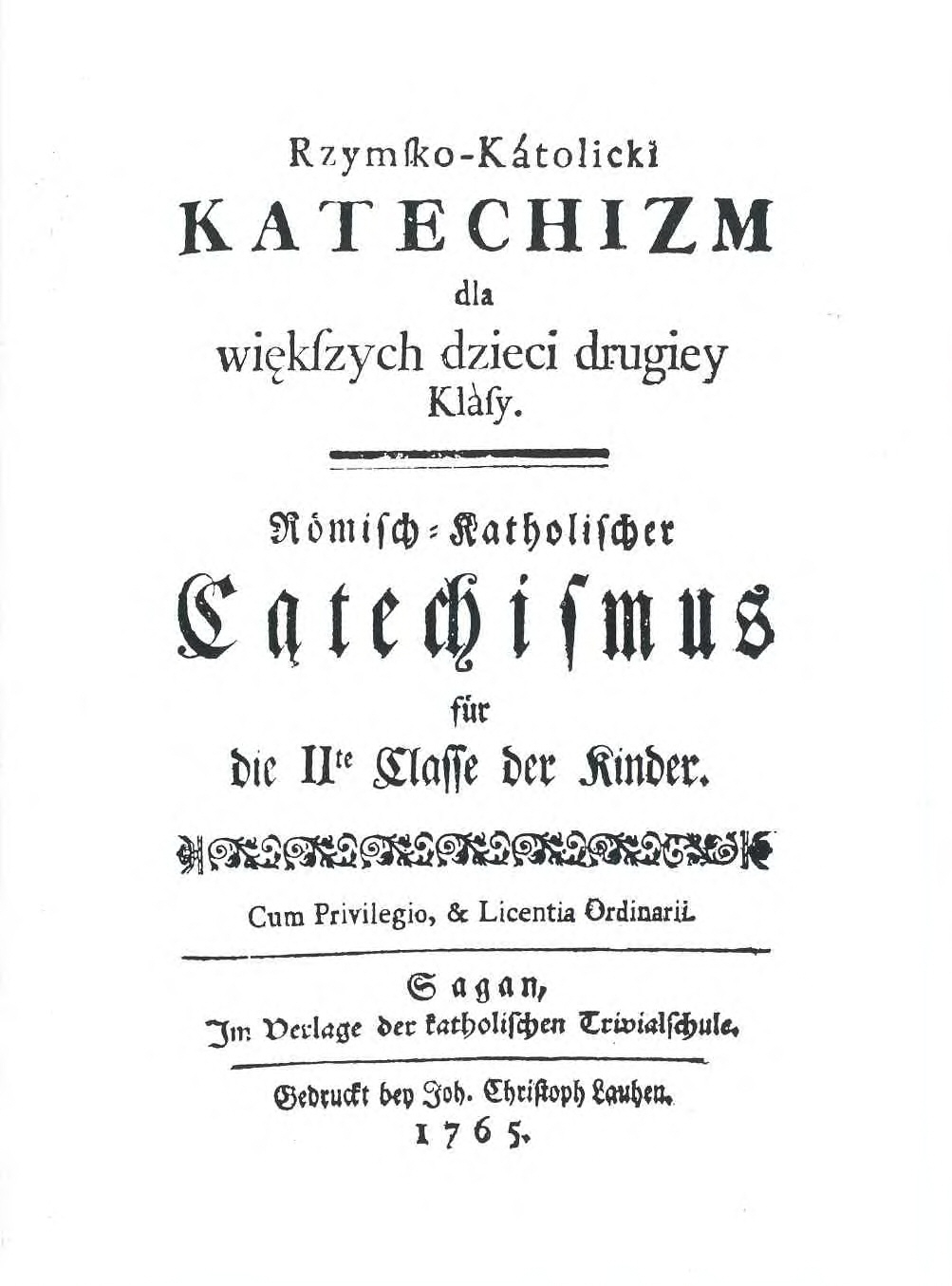
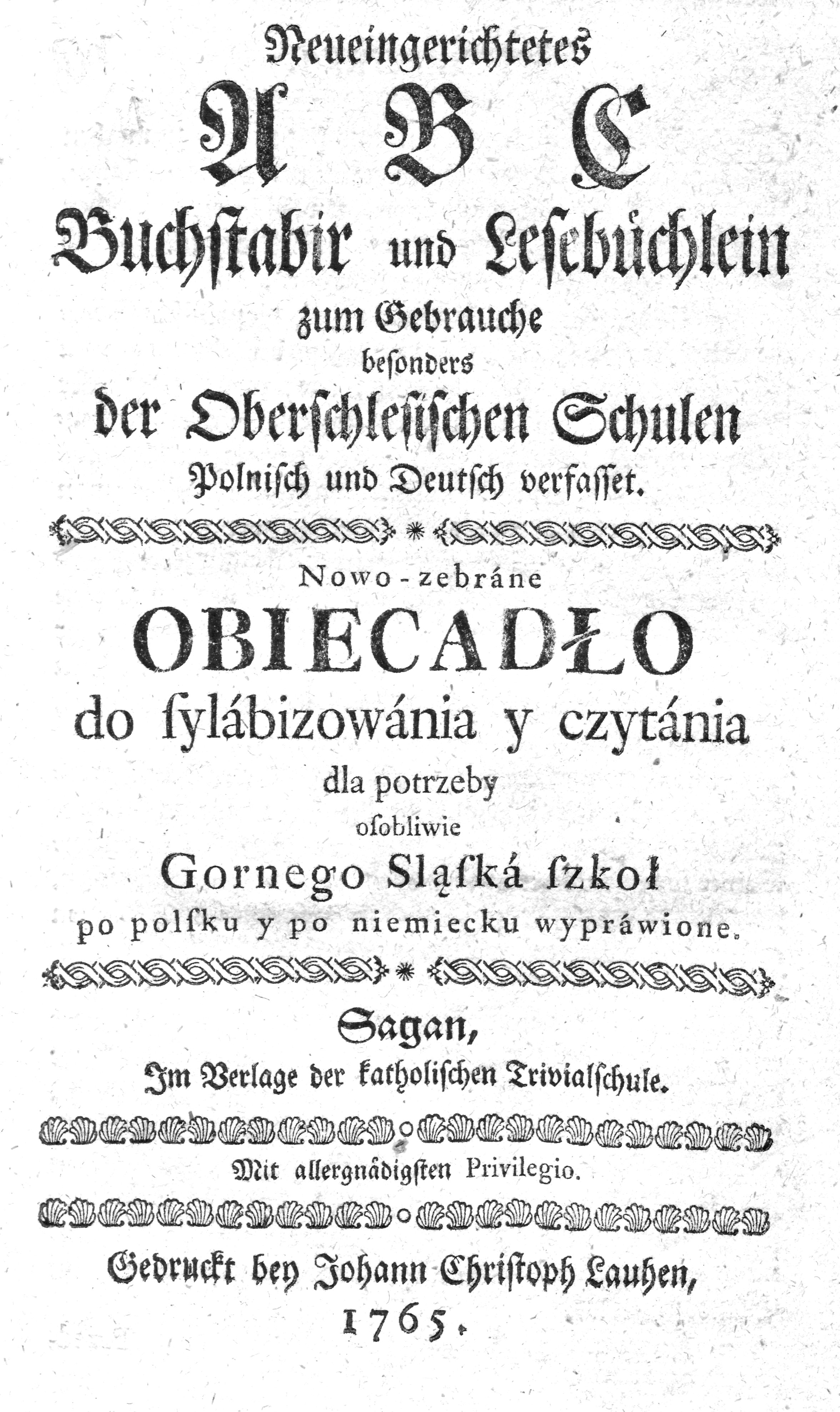
Polish-German catechism and primer, issued in 1765

In 1786, the fief was purchased by Peter von Biron, Duke of Courland, and in 1843, it passed to his daughter Dorothea, the wife of Edmond de Talleyrand, a nephew of the great French diplomat Talleyrand, who spent her retirement years at Sagan. A patent of King Frederick William IV of Prussia on 6 January 1845 invested her as Duchess of Sagan; and Napoleon III recognized the title in France, in favour of her son Louis.

=== Second World War ===
The double title (a prince and a duc) both Prussian and French, served to render the duc de Sagan a neutral party during the Second World War: his Château de Valençay provided a safe haven for treasures of the Louvre during the German occupation of France.

During the war, the Germans operated two prisoner-of-war camps and a forced labour camp in the town, all intended for prisoners of various nationalities. Sagan was occupied by Soviet troops during the third week of February 1945, following several days of savage fighting.

==== Prisoner of war camps and The Great Escape ====
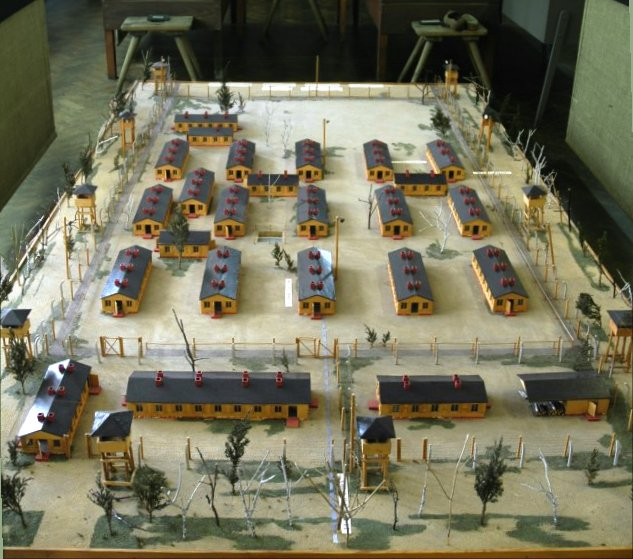
Model of Stalag Luft III at the Żagań Historical Museum

As early as 1939, soon after invading Poland, Nazi Germany established a system of prisoner of war (POW) camps in Sagan. In total, the Mannschafts-Stammlager Stalag VIIIC and its subsidiaries held over 300,000 prisoners from some 30 different countries. It is estimated that around 120,000 of them died of hunger, disease and maltreatment. Later, in 1942, an additional camp was set up for Allied pilots, called Stalag Luft III.

Memorial to 50 Allied POWs murdered by the Germans after the Great Escape

In March 1942, the town became the location of the Stalag Luft III camp for captured airmen (Kriegsgefangenen Stammlager der Luftwaffe 3 Sagan). It was the site of the most courageous escape resulting in the killing of 50 prisoners including the following Polish flight officers: Major Antoni Kiewnarski; Lieutenant Stanisław Król; and navigation Lieutenants Włodzimierz Kolanowski, Jerzy Mondschein, Kazimierz Pawluk and Paweł Tobolski. This episode of history was the subject of the 1963 film The Great Escape, starring Steve McQueen. It was the biggest and the most deadly escape of officer aircrew captured by Nazi Germany during the entire war. The number of prisoners attempting the escape was 200, of whom 76 managed to leave the camp; 73 were caught and 50 executed on Hitler's orders. Just three successfully escaped, one to Gibraltar and two to Sweden. All three reunited in England.

There were only a few other, similar escapes from German POW camps during the Second World War. A slightly smaller one on 6 March 1943, from Oflag XXI-B in Szubin, involved 43 British officers. On 19–20 September 1943 an escape from the Oflag VI B in Dössel near Wartburg involved 47 Polish officers. A day later 67 French officers escaped from Edelbach in Austria. Another involved 54 French soldiers on 18 December 1943, from Marlag near Hamburg.

=== Modern Poland ===
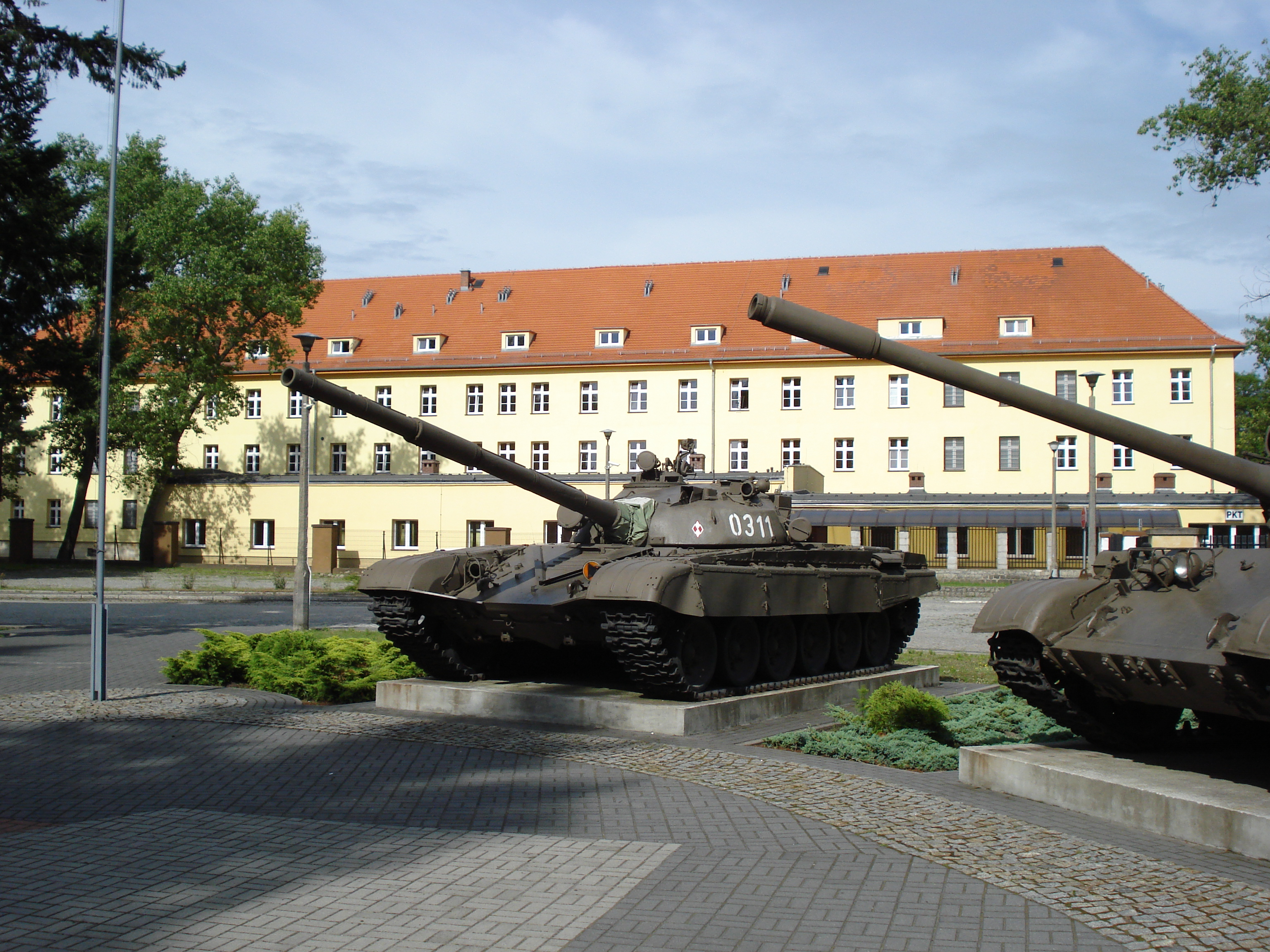
T-72 tanks in the grounds of Lieutenant General Zygmunt Sadowski Barracks. The 34th Armoured Cavalry Brigade is based in Żagań.

After Nazi Germany's defeat, the town became again part of Poland as the result of the border changes decided at the Potsdam Conference. The totality of the town's population was expelled, and the town was repopulated by Poles, many displaced from former eastern Poland annexed by the Soviet Union.

Clearing the rubble began in 1947, and was followed by the establishment of small enterprises, factories and schools. During the 1970s, a "new town" quarter was built, and by 1983, the historic baronial château ("Żagań Palace") had been fully rebuilt.

For many years regiments of the Soviet Air Forces flew from the town's airbase (Żagań-Tomaszowo?). In 1992 the 42nd Guards Bomber Aviation Regiment finally left and was disbanded after a brief stay at Szprotawa.

In the years 1967–1971 a museum dedicated to the history of prisoners of war of the Stalag VIII-C camp was established. From 1975 to 1998, Żagań was administratively located in the Zielona Góra Voivodeship. In 2011, the former Augustinian monastery complex with the church of the Assumption was designated a Historic Monument of Poland. In 2013, the first Polish monument of Wojtek the Bear, soldier of the Polish II Corps during World War II, was unveiled in Żagań.

== Sights and monuments ==
Sights of Żagań (selected)

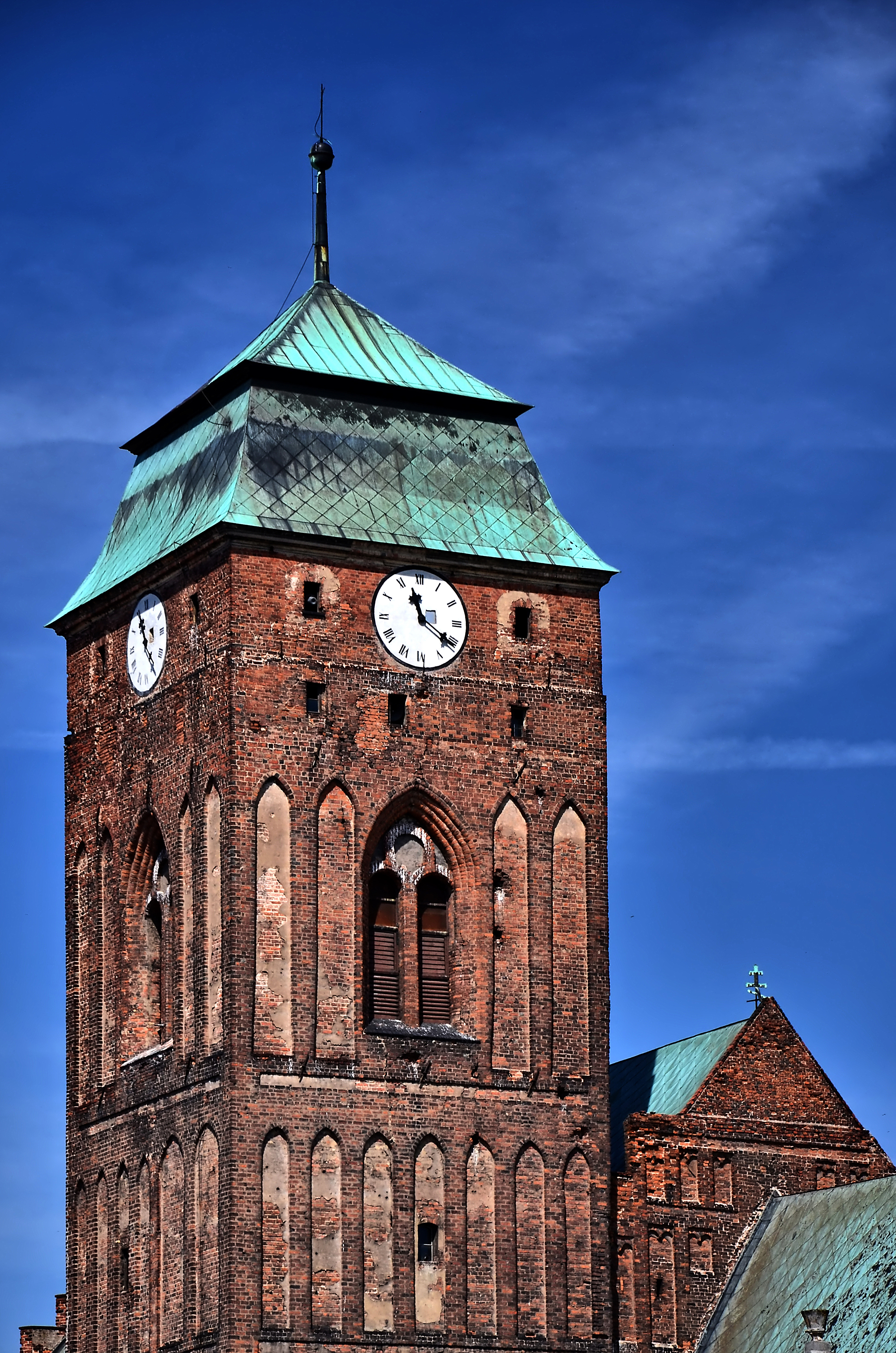
Church of the Assumption

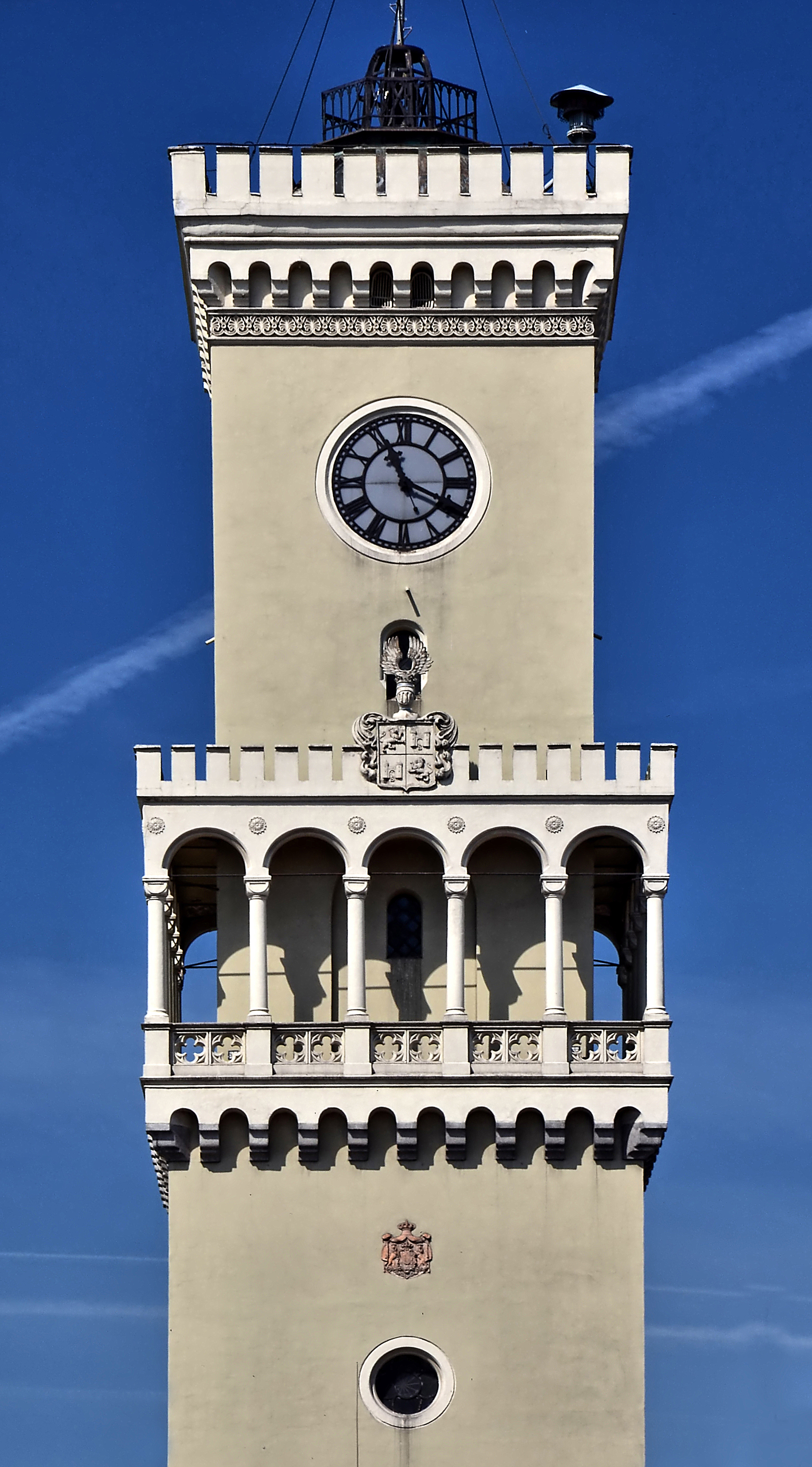
Clock tower of the former Town Hall

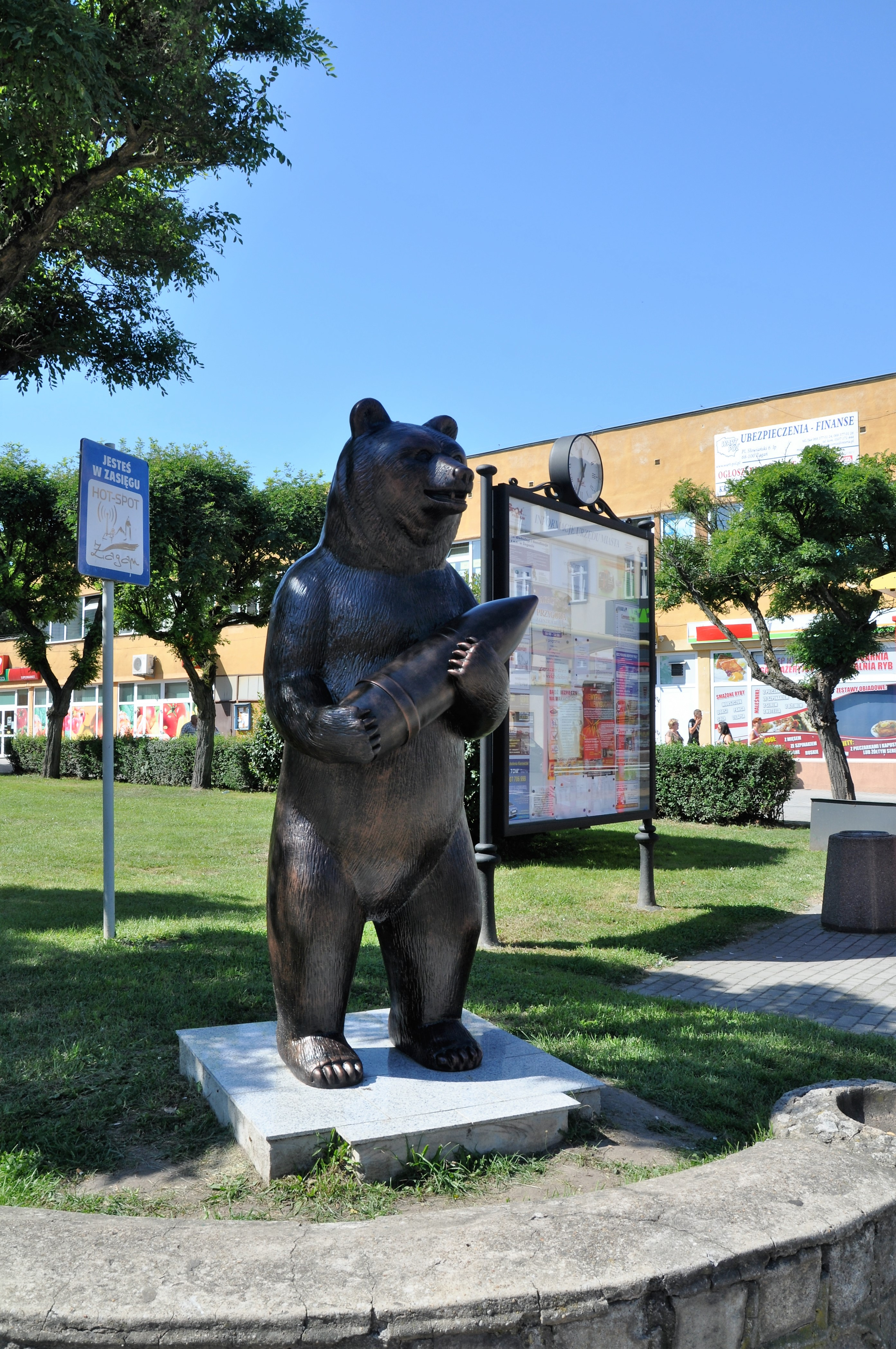
Monument of Wojtek the Bear

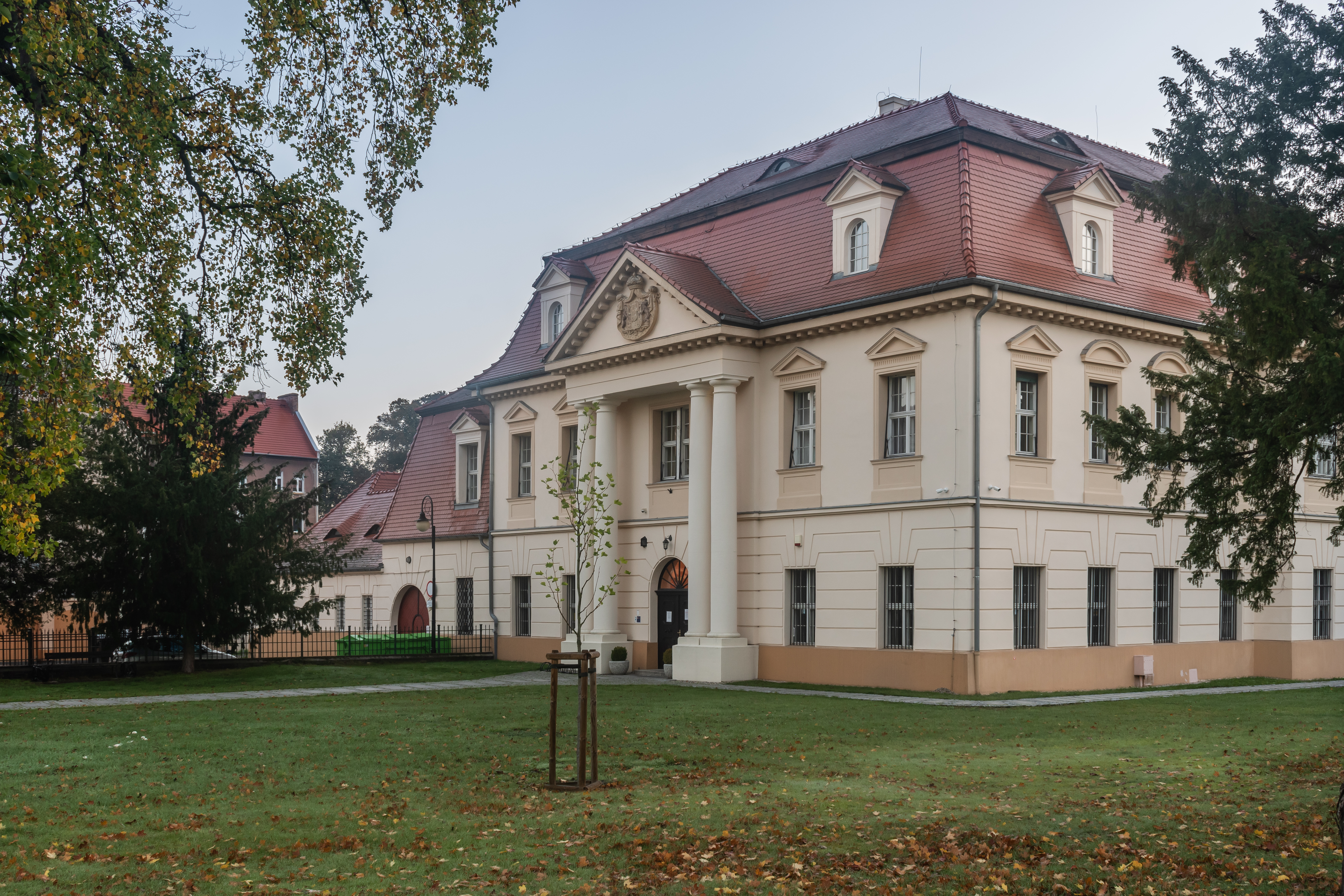
District court in Żagań

- Baroque ducal palace.
- Palace park.
- Post-Augustinian Monastery Complex with the church of the Assumption, one of the burial sites of the Piast dynasty, named one of Poland's official national Historic Monuments (Pomnik historii), as designated on 11 March 2011. Its listing is maintained by the National Heritage Board of Poland.
- Post-franciscan monastery with the Saints Peter and Paul church.
- Town hall.
- Museum of the World War II POW camp.
- Monument of Wojtek the Bear, soldier of the II Corps of the Polish Army during World War II.
- Post-evangelical Church Tower.
- Medieval town walls.

== Sports ==
Żagań is home to sports' clubs

- Czarni Żagań – football club, now plays in the lower leagues, 1964–65 Polish Cup runner-up
- WKS Sobieski Żagań – volleyball club, now plays in II liga (3rd tier)
- KS Bóbr Żagań – volleyball and rugby club
- UKS Orzeł Żagań – youth unihockey club

== Transport ==
=== Roads running through Żagań ===
Voivodeship road 296

Voivodeship road 295

National road 12

=== Important roads running near Żagań ===
National road 27

National road 18

Motorway A18 / E 36

Motorway A4 / E 40

Expressway S3 / E 65

== Notable people ==
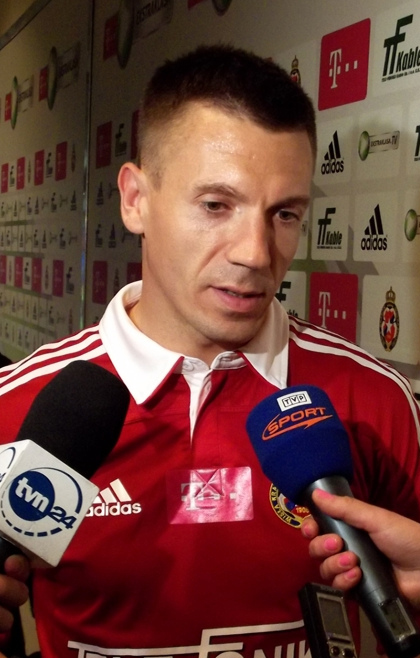
Łukasz Garguła, former Polish footballer

- Johannes Kepler (1571–1630), German astronomer, mathematician and astrologer, lived in Sagan in 1628–1630
- Albrecht von Wallenstein (1583–1634), duke of Sagan from 1627 to 1634
- Johann Ignaz von Felbiger (1724–1788), educational reformer, abbot of the Order of. St. Augustine in Sagan
- Peter von Biron (1724–1800), duke of Sagan from 1786 to 1800
- Louis XVIII (1755–1824), future king of France, spent several months in 1793 in Sagan.
- Stendhal (1783–1842), French writer, spent several months in 1813 in Sagan
- Dorothea de Talleyrand-Périgord (1793–1862), princess of Sagan from 1844 to 1862
- Adolf Engler (1844–1930), German botanist
- Reinhold Röhricht (1842–1905), German historian, studied at the Gymnasium in Sagan in 1852–1862
- Helene Weiss (1898–1951), German, Swiss and British philosopher.
- Wolfgang Paalen (1905–1959), Austrian painter and art philosopher, member of the Surrealist Group, spent part of his childhood in his father's castle St. Rochusburg near Sagan from 1913 to 1928
- Bronisława Wajs (1908–1987), Polish-Romani classic poet. She lived in Żagań in the '50s.
- Hans-Jürgen Steinmann (1929–2008), novelist
- Wolfgang Samuel (born 1935), German child refugee, author, U.S. Air Force pilot
- Brigitte Zimmermann (born 1939), journalist
- Ilse Kokula (born 1944), educator, author, LGBT activist
- Mariusz Jurasik (born 1976), handball player
- Łukasz Garguła (born 1981), footballer
- Konrad Michalak (born 1997), footballer.

== Twin towns – sister cities ==
Żagań is twinned with:

- Duns, Scotland, United Kingdom
- Grumo Nevano, Italy
- Netphen, Germany
- Ortrand, Germany
- Saint-Omer, France
- Teltow, Germany
- Khotyn, Ukraine

== Notable facts ==
- Johannes Kepler started writing the early science fiction Somnium (novel) before his death in 1630.
- In 1769, one of the first lightning rods in Europe was installed on the Church of the Assumption in the local Augustinian monastery.
