= Łozy, Lubusz Voivodeship =

Łozy
- Village
- Location within Poland
- Coordinates: 51°29′24″N 15°21′40″E
- Country: Poland
- Voivodeship: Lubusz
- County: Żagań
- Gmina: Żagań

Łozy [ˈwɔzɨ] is a village in the administrative district of Gmina Żagań, within Żagań County, Lubusz Voivodeship, in western Poland.
