= Kocin =

Kocin may refer to:

- Kočín, a municipality and village in the Czech Republic
- Kocin, Poland, a village in Lubusz Voivodeship in western Poland
- Paul Kocin (born 1955), American meteorologist
- Umut Koçin (born 1988), Turkish former professional footballer
