= Żagań County =

Żagań County Powiat żagański
- County
- Flag Coat of arms

- Location within the voivodeship

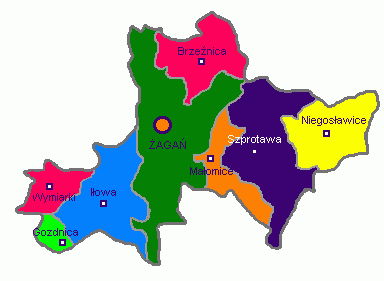
- Division into gminas
- Coordinates (Żagań): 51°37′N 15°19′E
- Country: Poland
- Voivodeship: Lubusz
- Seat: Żagań
- Gminas: Total 9 (incl. 2 urban): Gozdnica; Żagań; Gmina Brzeźnica; Gmina Iłowa; Gmina Małomice; Gmina Niegosławice; Gmina Szprotawa; Gmina Wymiarki; Gmina Żagań

Area
  - Total: 1,131.29 km^{2} (436.79 sq mi)

Population (2019-06-30)
  - Total: 79,297
  - Density: 70.094/km^{2} (181.54/sq mi)
  - Urban: 47,946
  - Rural: 31,351
- Car plates: FZG
- Website: http://www.powiatzaganski.pl

Żagań County (Polish: powiat żagański) is a unit of territorial administration and local government (powiat) in Lubusz Voivodeship, western Poland. It came into being on 1 January 1999 as a result of the Polish local government reforms passed in 1998. Its administrative seat and largest town is Żagań, which lies 39 km (24 mi) south of Zielona Góra and 124 km (77 mi) south of Gorzów Wielkopolski. The county contains four other towns: Szprotawa, lying 14 km (9 mi) south-east of Żagań, Iłowa, lying 15 km (9 mi) south-west of Żagań, Małomice, lying 12 km (7 mi) south-east of Żagań, and Gozdnica, 25 km (16 mi) south-west of Żagań.

The county covers an area of 1,131.29 square kilometres (436.8 sq mi). As of 2019 its total population is 79,297. The most populated towns are Żagań with 25,731 inhabitants and Szprotawa with 11,820 inhabitants.

== Neighbouring counties ==
Żagań County is bordered by Zielona Góra County to the north, Nowa Sól County to the north-east, Głogów County and Polkowice County to the east, Bolesławiec County and Zgorzelec County to the south, and Żary County to the west.

== Administrative divisions ==
The county is subdivided into nine gminas (two urban, three urban-rural and four rural). These are listed in the following table, in descending order of population.

Gmina	Type	Area (km^{2})	Population (2019)	Seat
Żagań	urban	39.9	25,731	
Gmina Szprotawa	urban-rural	232.3	20,684	Szprotawa
Gmina Żagań	rural	281.1	7,324	Żagań*
Gmina Iłowa	urban-rural	153.1	6,881	Iłowa
Gmina Małomice	urban-rural	79.5	5,181	Małomice
Gmina Niegosławice	rural	136.1	4,413	Niegosławice
Gmina Brzeźnica	rural	122.2	3,759	Brzeźnica
Gozdnica	urban	24.0	3,036	
Gmina Wymiarki	rural	63.1	2,288	Wymiarki
* seat not part of the gmina
