= List of settlements in the Federation of Bosnia and Herzegovina/A =

List of settlements in the Federation of Bosnia and Herzegovina - A
Settlement	City or municipality	Canton
Abdulići	Bratunac	
Adže	Maglaj	Zenica-Doboj Canton
Adžići	Gradiška	
Agarovići	Rogatica	
Aginci	Dubica	
Agino Selo	Banja Luka	
Agići	Derventa	
Ahmetovci	Novi Grad	
Ahmići	Vitez	Central Bosnia Canton
Ahmovići	Goražde	Bosnian-Podrinje Canton Goražde
Ajdinovići	Višegrad	
Alagići	Kakanj	Zenica-Doboj Canton
Alibegovci	Doboj	
Alibegovići	Bugojno	Central Bosnia Canton
Alifakovac	Stari Grad	Sarajevo Canton
Alipašino Polje	Novi Grad	Sarajevo Canton
Amajlije	Bijeljina	
Anđelije	Foča	
Aranđelovo	Trebinje	
Arapuša	Bosanska Krupa	Una-Sana Canton
Arbanaška	Trebinje	
Argud	Konjic	Herzegovina-Neretva Canton
Arslanagića Most	Trebinje	
Ataševac	Drvar	Canton 10
Avlija	Čajniče	
Avramovina	Gradačac	Tuzla Canton
Avtovac	Gacko	
Azapovići	Kiseljak	Central Bosnia Canton
