= Lužany =

Lužany may refer to places:

== Czech Republic ==
- Lužany (Hradec Králové District), a municipality and village in the Hradec Králové Region
- Lužany (Jičín District), a municipality and village in the Hradec Králové Region
- Lužany (Plzeň-South District), a municipality and village in the Plzeň Region

== Slovakia ==
- Lužany pri Topli, a municipality and village in the Prešov Region
- Lužany (Topoľčany), a municipality and village in the Nitra Region

== See also ==
- Luzan (disambiguation)
- Lužani (disambiguation)
