= Lužani =

Lužani is a Slavic place name. It may refer to:

- Lužani, Croatia, a village in the Brod-Posavina County
- Lužani, Gradiška, Bosnia and Herzegovina
- Lužani, Prnjavor, Bosnia and Herzegovina
- Lužani, Derventa, Bosnia and Herzegovina
- Lužani, Gornji Vakuf, Bosnia and Herzegovina
- Lužani, Sanski Most, Bosnia and Herzegovina
- Lužani, Ilidža, a section of Ilidža, Bosnia and Herzegovina
- Lužani Novi, Bosnia and Herzegovina
- Lužani Bosanski, Bosnia and Herzegovina
- Lužani (tribe), a medieval tribe in present-day Montenegro

== See also ==
- Luzan (disambiguation)
- Lužany (disambiguation), several places in Czech Republic and Slovakia
