= Brezici =

Brezici may refer to:

- Brezici (Derventa), a village in Bosnia and Herzegovina
- Brezici (Maglaj), a village in Bosnia and Herzegovina
