= Višnjik =

Višnjik may refer to:

- Višnjik, Sarajevo, a section of Sarajevo, Bosnia and Herzegovina
- Višnjik, Zadar, a section of Zadar, Croatia
- Donji Višnjik, a village near Derventa, Bosnia and Herzegovina
- Gornji Višnjik, a village near Derventa, Bosnia and Herzegovina
