= Drijen =

Drijen may refer to:

- Drijen (Derventa), Bosnia and Herzegovina
- Drijen (Kakanj), Bosnia and Herzegovina
