= Mišinci =

Mišinci may refer to:

- Mišinci, Bosnia and Herzegovina, a village near Derventa
- Mišinci, Croatia, a village near Žakanje
