= Luzan =

Luzan, Lužan or Luzán may refer to:

- Luzan, Alberta, Canada
- Luzan, Iran, in Ilam Province, Iran
- Lužan, a village in Croatia
- Lužan Biškupečki, Croatia
- Luzan (or Luschany), the former German names for the village of Luzhany, Chernivtsi oblast, Ukraine
- Luzan (surname)

== See also ==
- Lužani (disambiguation)
- Lužany (disambiguation)
- Luzon, main island of the Philippines
