= Miloš Savčić =

Serbian politician and businessman

Miloš Savčić Милош Савчић
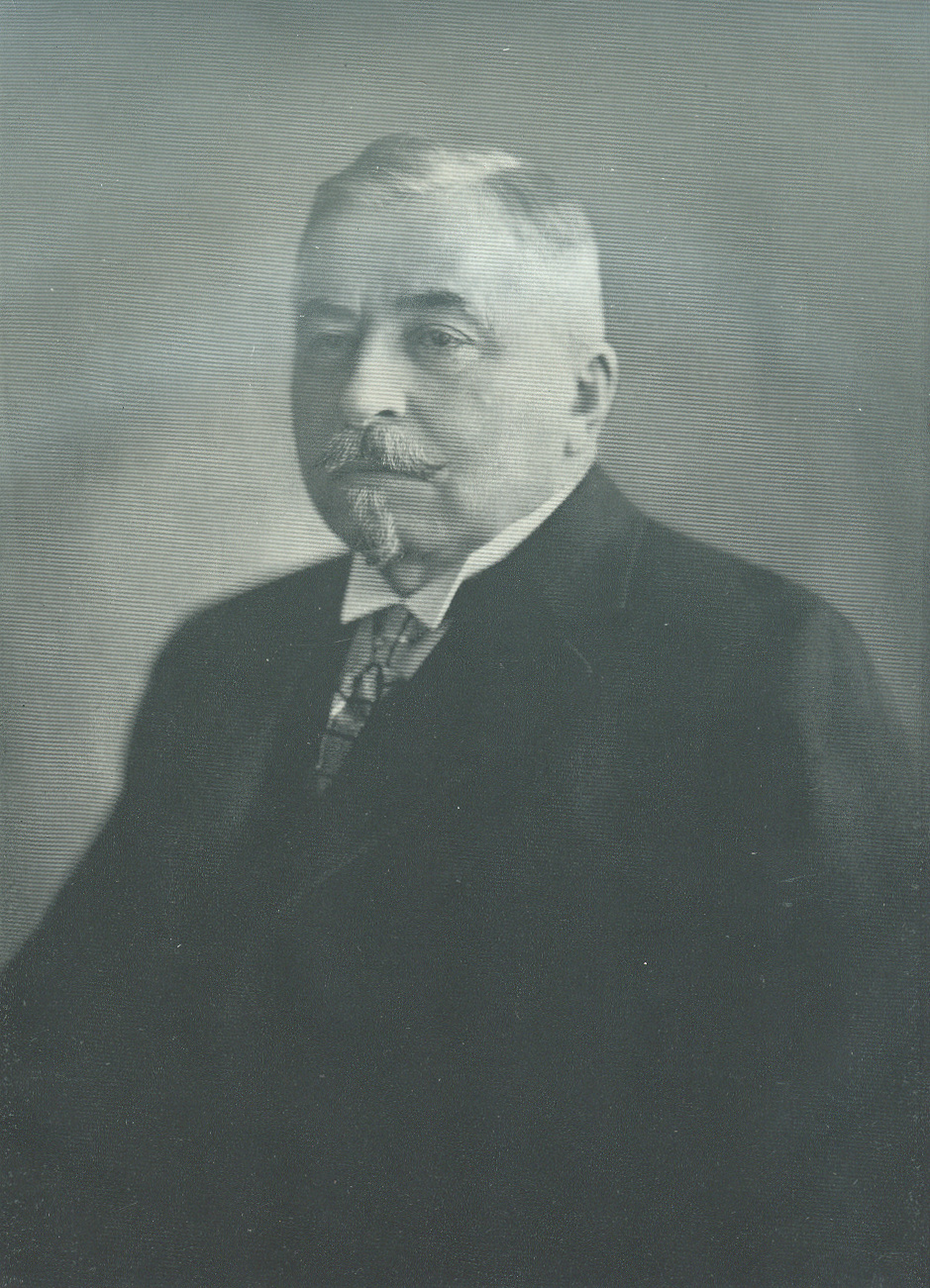
- Photo of Savčić
- Born: 26 July 1865; Svilajnac, Principality of Serbia
- Died: 9 March 1941 (aged 75); Belgrade, Kingdom of Yugoslavia
- Education: Technical University of Munich
- Occupations: politician, businessman, engineer, banker and entrepreneur

Miloš Savčić (Svilajnac, 26 July 1865 – Belgrade, 9 March 1941) was a Serbian politician, businessman, engineer, banker and entrepreneur who was one of the richest Europeans of his time. Savčić served as Minister of Construction, Mayor of Belgrade, advisor, and manager of numerous economic facilities in the Kingdom of Serbia and the Kingdom of Yugoslavia. He is considered to be one of the most influential Serbs of his time.

== Early life and education ==
Miloš Savčić was born in Svilajnac, in Resava, on 26 July 1865 (Old Style) to Teodor and Jelena Savčić. His father was a well-to-do merchant.

In his hometown, he finished both elementary school and high school, and in Belgrade, in 1885 he graduated with a B.Sc. from Velika škola. For his post-graduate studies, Savčić went to Germany and enrolled at the Technical University of Munich. In 1889 he graduated from the master's program in Civil Engineering. His professor was Carl von Linde.

== Engineer in Munich ==
After completing his studies, at the invitation of one of his professors, who taught roads and railways at the polytechnical institute, Savčić remained in Germany for two more years, working on the construction of the Royal Bavarian State Railway. As a young Serbian engineer, such a job was a rare opportunity to gain valuable experience. However, as a foreign citizen, he could not become a civil servant, he could only work as a contractual employee.

He first worked on the expansion of the train station in Munich. In the beginning, he was engaged in surveying the terrain, based on his recordings, other engineers made a study, then marking all the buildings and curves, and when the construction of facilities began: sewers, intersections with trams, electrical plants and a 30 km long railway, he worked as supervising engineer on the construction of one of the bridges, on which reinforced concrete arches were made for the first time. Upon completion of the work, his task was to review the entire study, which had previously been prepared by his colleagues.

After that, they hired him to make an extensive and detailed study, because of which he travelled all over Bavaria, and he had assistants in the business, to whom he showed the recording and tracing of the terrain. This job brought him a lot of success and recognition. Although he was a young engineer, he worked as a senior engineer, with twice the salary, which was the reason why some of his fellow senior engineers looked down on him with envy.

For a while, he worked in the department for switches, on the method of centralizing switches, according to the "block system".

== Return to Serbia ==
In 1891, owing to his mother's death, Savčić decided to leave his job at the Royal Bavarian State Railway and go back to Serbia. At that time, he was supposed to move to Paris and work for Gustave Eiffel, who gained world fame after the construction of the famous Eiffel Tower. Since the job was supposed to start in May next year, in order to use his free time, he went to serve his military service, which by law should have lasted five months or less, in case he passed the officer's exam earlier. However, Savčić failed the practical part of the exam, where he was given the task of marking a triangle on the field, and since he solved the task in an engineering-tracer way, instead of according to military rules. As a result, Savčić had to extend his military service and cancel his contract with Gustave Eiffel.

After completing his military service, in 1893 he got a job in the Municipality of Belgrade. After a year, he decided, with the financial help of his father, uncle and brother, to start his own business, opening the Engineering and Architecture Office in Belgrade, together with a friend from Munich, the architect Gaspar Becker, in 1893. At that time, opening his own design company was a completely new initiative, which caused skepticism among family and friends. Also, the state did not have enough funds for major technical works, such as roads, railways, sewers, bridges, therefore, his firm initially devoted itself to making housing projects. In addition, private deals were concluded without complicated procedures, without fees, certificates, or cadastral plans. Larger contracts were made by ordinary letter, while smaller ones were based on oral agreements and a handshake.

He was hired for his first job by Luka Ćelović, who asked him to make a plan for a private house in Karađorđeva Street in Belgrade. He was hired by rich merchants Jovan Jovanović Šapčanin and Milan Pavlović, and cassation judge Milutin Marković, all for the purpose of building private family homes. After Becker's death in 1896, he collaborated with architects Danilo Vladisavljević and Milan Kapetanović.

== Construction of a slaughterhouse in Belgrade ==
One of the biggest problems in Serbia at the time was the closure of the Hungarian border for the export of live pigs, under the pretext that the pigs were allegedly infected or suspected of being infected by the disease of some sort. During 1895 alone, the border was closed three times, and a similar situation was repeated in the following years, forcing the Serbian government to begin the struggle for economic liberation from Austria-Hungary.

A slaughterhouse in Belgrade of the Serbian Joint-Stock Company for Slaughter and Processing of Livestock (1906) was built according to the project of Miloš Savčić. All this was done in the fight for economic independence during the Customs War imposed on Serbia by Austria-Hungary. Everything had to be done to expedite the products in the most efficient manner. Sausages longer than a meter and thicker than a muscle, raised and clenched fists and knives, united citizens, butchers, peasants, guardsmen, workers, and in the background special wagons of the Serbian state railways transported meat in ice to their destination as quickly and efficiently as possible.

The first solution was to export meat products instead of pigs, which could be exported to other countries as well as Austria-Hungary, Switzerland, Germany, Belgium, etc., without the risk of spoiling the meat. For that reason, the Serbian government passed the Law on State Aid to Slaughterhouse Companies in 1895, and the newly established Serbian Joint-Stock Company for Slaughter and Processing of Livestock in Belgrade decided to hire Savčić to study the organization of slaughterhouses in Austria and Germany. During 1896, he submitted a recalculation and the following year received the right to build a slaughterhouse, which became one of the most important state projects. The opposition, led by the president of the Association of Engineers of Serbia, Todor Selešković, opposed the favouring of Savčić and his company, demanding that more experts be sent abroad. However, the slaughterhouse (later named "BIM Slavija") was built in 1898, along with the buildings for the stock exchange, post office, telegraph office, workers' apartments, smokehouses, cold storage, barns, etc., with a layout that provided for all possible extensions. which led the public to conclude that Savčić had done the job very successfully. In addition, the entire complex played a significant role in the struggle for economic independence during the Customs War, when Serbia emerged the winner. After the construction of the slaughterhouse, his public reputation and trust in his work jumped. Due to his acquired reputation, conscientious work and initiative, Savčić was considered by many institutions as an advisor, associate or direct contractor. A year later, he invested the capital acquired from this company in the shares of Belgrade Transport Bank and was elected a member of its Supervisory Board, and then the Board of Directors.

== The Steam-powered Sawmill ==
Working at the slaughterhouse, he quickly became aware of Serbia's economic dependence on foreign countries, especially the import of timber construction materials from Austria-Hungary. For that reason, he considered it necessary to build a lathe (tool and dye operation), which would lower the price of this material on the domestic market. His intention was for the Belgrade Transport Bank to provide money for the construction of the lathe, but he initially encountered great resistance from the bank's Board of Directors. In 1901, he persuaded the board to allow his associates to construct Belgrade's first steam-powered sawmill. The management finally approved his proposal on the condition that Savčić accepts personal liability for any losses. Two years later, the first major steam-powered sawmill in the Kingdom of Serbia was built on the banks of the Danube, which was constantly expanding its capacity until the outbreak of the First World War.

One of the biggest problems of the sawmill was the question of procurement cheap timber because lumber initially arrived from abroad or procured together material on the domestic market. In 1902, the bank received from the state the right to exploit the forests on Tara near the rivers Derventa, Crni Vhr and Zvijezda, and the material was brought by rafts on the Drina, Sava and Danube, to the canal that had a sawmill (Serbian: strugara) in Belgrade. The canal in Belgrade was built to make the material easier to pull out of the rafts because, in the beginning, ox power was used to pull it out. Initially, the cutting was done manually, but later motorized machines began to be used, and over time, the machining plant was enlarged.Since the forest on Tara lay on a wasteland, on very steep slopes, intersected by gorges and gorges, it was not possible to transport the material to the Drina, Savčić, with the help of German colleagues, designed a special cable car. The cable car was built in two stages. The first stage, 6,010 m long, with a drop of 800 m, and passing through two tunnels in the rocks, 56 and 26 m long, was built in 1908. Tunnelling is done in winter, and construction materials for the building lift are transported from Belgrade by wagon, sled and on foot. There is a distance of 400 m between the small and the large tunnel above the Drina valley. The second stage, 3,860 m long, was a 380 m ascent. The speed of the load moving by the cable car was regulated by a hydraulic brake regulator, and the load was moving due to its own weight without driving force. Section for the exploitation of forests in the Tara and the way the material was brought cited as an example of rational overcoming natural obstacles.

The Turning operation in Belgrade became one of the most successful wood processing companies in the country and employed between 120 and 280 workers. [19] Thanks to it, Serbia became an exporter of timber instead of an importer of timber.

== Insurance company "Serbia" ==
In 1903, he became vice-president of the Belgrade Transport Bank, and two years later the bank changed its name to Prometna Banka. There Savčić urged the board members of the bank to create its own construction department. Once established (1906), it had acquired a small fleet of river dredges by 1909. They provided sand and gravel for the construction industry. One of the bank's shareholders became King Peter I Karađorđević. At the idea of King Peter I, in 1905, through the Board of Directors of Prometna Banka, "'Serbia', the first Serbian insurance company" was opened, ie the first insurance company in Serbia (except for the insurance department of the Belgrade Cooperative, which already existed). Shares with the ordinal number from 1 to 300 were also bought by King Peter I, which helped the idea of realizing such a society. From the very beginning, Savčić was in the management of that company and actively managed its affairs.

In a very short period of time, the company gained a large response from citizens from all walks of life, so that at the end of the first balance the company could already write off excise costs and make an immediate profit. Since 1908, the so-called national insurance, for small sums, so that it was accessible to everyone, even the poorest citizens. Even before the Balkan Wars, the company had a contract with the State Railways. Despite all the difficulties, the insurance company managed to survive by paying regular and war damages. After the Balkan Wars, the company expanded its activities to Southern Serbia, and after the First World War to the whole of Yugoslavia, opening offices throughout the country, where there was a greater response, branching out into all types of insurance.

== Vračar Savings Bank ==
In 1904, the shareholders of Vračarska štedionica elected him a member of the Management Board. Shortly after that, the savings bank received the right from the state to exploit Rbarska Spa (Ribarska Banja), for which Savčić prepared a situation, levelling and regulation plan. The spa was completely modernized. All works in the spa were done according to his instructions. In the same year, the villa "Srbija" was built, in which King Peter I was a frequent guest in the summer. The following year, the villa "Bosna" was built, with 39 rooms on the first floor, while the offices of the spa administration and the doctor's office were located on the ground floor, along with a pharmacy, post office, and various shops. In the same year, 1905, villas "Herzegovina", "Dalmatia", "Slavonia", "Old Serbia" were built, and in 1907, villa "Montenegro". In addition to these villas, there was a building with 10 rooms for lower class accommodation, as well as a building with 20 rooms for free accommodation for the poor. The spa became one of the most beautiful spas and resorts of that time.

== Other pre-war projects ==
Thanks to Savčić's skilful management, in 1909 the bank expanded its business to include shipping and river transport of sand and gravel, which were in great demand in the construction industry. First, two wooden boats were procured, and later ships, trucks, tugboats, an excavator and an elevator, which were used to transport and unload sand, gravel, as well as timber, which arrived from Tara.

In the same year, the Glass Factory in Kostolac was founded.

In that period, Savčić also became the vice-president of the Board of Directors of the Privileged Export Bank, which in 1911 founded the Company for Technical Enterprises with Prometna bank, during which time Savčević became its technical director. At the public auction, the company was entrusted with the construction of the Niš-Knjaževac railway in a length of 60 km, with 39 tunnels and 20 bridges. Construction was interrupted during the Balkan Wars, and continued in 1915 at a forced pace, due to its strategic importance, in order to connect Niš with the Danube. Due to the importance of the railway, the works were visited by various politicians, including Prince Regent Alexander. Some 1200 m of the Gramad tunnel was breached, and about 5-6 thousand prisoners of war took part in the works. About 90% of the planned works were completed that year alone.

During the construction of the railway, rich deposits of coal were found at the foot of Mount Tresibaba. From 1909 to 1915, only tests were carried out, and in 1915 Savčić received a privilege from the state to exploit 150 ore fields in that territory, which had to be postponed due to the war and the undeveloped railway. During the occupation, mine Tresibaba was exploited by the Bulgarians, and later the Germans. Until the construction of the railway, coal was transported by bullock carts.

== World War I ==
Before the First World War, during the prosecution of the Austro-Hungarian ultimatum, he was in Munich. On the eve of the declaration of war, he moved from Germany to Switzerland, so as not to be detained or interned. From there, he returned to Serbia and immediately placed himself at the disposal of the army, which instructed him to complete the construction of the Niš-Knjaževac railway.

He was one of the thousands who in late 1915 joined the Serbian retreat through Albanian mountains together with the entire Serbian army, including King Peter I and his cabinet. In 1916, he found himself in Geneva, where together with Jovan Cvijić and professor Tihomir Đorđević the Central Committee for Serbian Reconstruction was established, aimed to collect donations among Serbian allies and friends of the Serbian people as first aid at the time of liberation. He also participated in the founding of the League of Nations.

He is the author of several professional papers. Together with Milić Radovanović and Ljubomir Jovanović, he wrote the following works during the war:

- "Wealth of Serbia"
- "War damage and reparations"
- "Future economic program of Serbia"
- "Serbia in terms of the property before, during and after the world war 1914-1918"

== Post-war period ==
During the war, the installations and inventory on Tara were looted and taken away. The steam [sawmill] in Belgrade was destroyed in the fire, and the fleet and ships were partly destroyed by enemy artillery from the monitor, while the other part was taken to the upper course of the Danube. The glass factory in Kostolac was destroyed by the enemy so that no foundations remained. The new Privredna bank building was significantly damaged by enemy artillery.

After the war and the deaths of Mihailo Popović and Nikola Spasić, Savčić became the President of the Board of Directors of Prometna Banka, from which, with the help of the bank's director Mihailo Dragičević, he created one of the most successful commercial banks in the Kingdom of Yugoslavia.

He invested maximum efforts in the reconstruction so that the bank and all business companies could continue with normal work after only a year. The lathe operations in Belgrade were expanded, and a three-storey house for workers' apartments was built next to it, as well as a connecting railway track to the railway of the social railway for loading wagons. It was done in two or three shifts. The sawmill operation employed about 300 workers and 20 clerks.

Considering that after the war, during the payment of war damages, the allies did nothing to return the vessels that the enemy stole and took away from the fleet in Belgrade, new ships, excavators, elevators, etc. were procured and a new workshop was built on the Sava River coast.

In 1921, the Association of Banks was founded on the premises of Prometna Banka. One of the main goals of this association was the joint appearance of Serbian banks during the nationalization of the Beocin Cement Factory and the Sartid Society (founded in 1913) through the purchase of a number of shares, as well as the establishment of new banks in the liberated territories. He was vice-president and a member of the Board of Directors of the Beocin Cement Factory and the Sartid Company, as well as many other companies. After the First World War, two banks, Izvozna and Prometna, formed a joint bank in Skopje called Izvozna i prometna banka a.d., in order to expand the joint scope of work on the territory of Old Serbia.

== Fuel Exploitation Company ==
In 1920, the management of Prometna Banka founded the Fuel Exploitation Society. After the completion of the Niš-Knjaževac railway in 1921, the exploitation of ore fields in that territory, found before the war, began. In 1930, Prometna Banka took over from Đorđe Vajfert the privilege over the mines Podvis (north of Timok and Tresibaba) and Blagovesti, in which over 800 miners and officials worked. The Tresibab and Podvis mines had their own power plant, with three locomotives of 125, 205 and 325 horsepower, with three corresponding 380 V generators. Modern machine cranes of 100 hp each were installed above the mine shafts. Ventilation in the mines was artificial, with separate air shafts, over which fans were placed to pump "spoiled" air. Air compacted by compressors under a pressure of six atmospheres was used to operate pneumatic hammers - drills. The mines also had the necessary workshops: blacksmith, locksmith, carpenter, electrician. More than 40 engines of various heights were installed at the entire mine plant.

Special attention was paid to providing the best possible working conditions. A large colony for free housing for workers and their families was built to house staff and workers. Other workers were recruited from surrounding villages. Families and workers had the right to free heating, electricity, they had at their disposal a warehouse with groceries, in which they bought below market prices. There was an ambulance with a pharmacy run by a local doctor. In addition to the apartments, the workers also had some land for gardens. The children at the Podvis mine attended a state primary school, the construction of which was financed by the Fuel Exploitation Society with all the necessary inverters. There was a football club at the Podvis mine, as well as a 15-member music orchestra.

In 1938, a large building for a mining home was built on Tresibaba, which housed a canteen. In the same building, the Sokol Society also had its premises: large falconry with a stage and equipment for rehearsals and performances, a locker room with showers with hot and cold water, a department for the theatre section, a reading room and a library. The members of the Sokol Society were almost all the employees of the mine. Sound recording equipment was installed in the home. The mines had a modern rescue station, with 10 Dreger apparatus and 40 very well-trained members.

In 1921, a consortium was established, which bought mining fields from Petar Vujan for the exploitation of the Kosovo ore basin, and research began on the right bank of the Sitnica, near Crkvena Vodice. The following year, the Mining and Industrial Joint-Stock Company "Kosovo" was founded in Kosovska Mitrovica and exploitation began, and in 1923, works for more economical exploitation and easier transport from the lignite mine "Kosovo" to the railway station in Obilić began. Savčić, who performed the function of the president of the joint-stock company, had the greatest merits for the progress in the development of the "Kosovo" mine. In the first years, exploitation was small, due to the very poorly developed industry in Southern Serbia. After the joint-stock company passed into the hands of Prometna Banka, the mine began to prosper, and production and consumption increased, especially with the development of industry in Skopje.

After the opening of the Trepča mine in 1930, the Kosovo mine gained a permanent consumer, because the Trepča power plants used lignite from the Kosovo mine. A primitive cable car was built, with one rope, 2,925 m long and a drop of 25 m, with a loading station in the mine, and unloading at the railway station. The cable car could carry wagons of 500 kilograms. A power plant with locomotives was built and a special machine for extracting coal from the mine was constructed.

Due to the increase in the number of staff, a workers' colony of 10 buildings were built in the period 1936-1938, as well as 9 new office buildings and a busy building. The buildings had electric lighting and plumbing. A workshop for repairing machines and other inventory was opened, and due to increased coal exports, another mining shaft called "Alexander" was opened in 1938. Thanks to the investments of Privredna Banka, in the period 1930-1938, the "Kosovo" mine quadrupled its production, which enabled the electrification of Southern Serbia.

== Sawmill in Bosanska Jagodina ==
In 1927, a lathe was opened in Jagodina, near Višegrad, after Prometna Banka bought a forest in Zaovljanske Kosi from private individuals in 1921 and 1922. The detailed project, with all the side installations for the sawmill, was made by Savčić himself, although at that time he already had sons, engineers, and dozens of experts, cartoonists and engineers who worked for the companies he founded. For the needs of transporting wood, the same as on Tara, a wire railway was built, 8,200 m long and with a drop of 360 m. Material from the dismantled cable car on Tara was partly used for its construction. The planed timber was transported to Belgrade by rafts across the Rzava, the Drina, Sava and Danube.

The Strugara (as Serbs call the sawmill) started operating in 1928 and was the only place of employment for poor peasants in the region.

== Career in politics ==
In 1905, Savčić was one of the founders of the new Independent Radical Party.

In the period 1905-1911, and in 1923 he was a People's Deputy, as a member of the glavni odbor (Main Board) of the Independent Democratic Party, and in the period 1908-1909. Minister of Construction.

The function of the President of the Belgrade municipality performed in the period 1929-1930. At that time, the Municipal Savings Bank and the power plant were established. After the enforcement of the Sixth of January dictatorship (1929), the king dissolved the municipal administration by decree in 1926 and appointed Miloš Savčić mayor of Belgrade. Savčić was a supporter of King Alexander "with whom he had close relations in the past" during his reconstruction project days.

As the mayor has significantly increased the efficiency of the utilities of the city. He compiled travel books for hotels. Under his administration, the Statute was adopted, which regulated the issue of municipal officials. He also worked on the already started modern paving of Belgrade, for which he prepared a program and all the necessary studies. A new way of charging for electric lighting and water has been introduced, which has enabled municipal self-financing. The Savings Bank of the Municipality of the City of Belgrade was also established with the aim of receiving revenues and paying the costs of the municipality. As the executor of Nikola Spasić's will, the construction of the City Hospital in Belgrade began. A new, modern elementary school "King Alexander I" was built in Dečanska Street. His greatest merit in the function of the mayor is having liberated the city of unfavourable short-term loan, which is due to penalty interest threatened to quell the capital. The problem is solved by taking a new loan from Swiss banks, which the previous loan fully paid, and there is also a new power station in Belgrade. Because of this endeavour, he was severely attacked, and even sued in court on suspicion of financially damaging the Belgrade municipality, but the court found that the entire procedure for the construction of the power plant was done according to the law. The intertwining of political and economic functions was not uncommon at the time, but in the case of Miloš Savčić it aroused the suspicion of the Serbian public.

The next municipal administration in Belgrade, headed by Milan Nešić, was also appointed by decree on 23 May 1930.

== Wagon factory ==
At a public auction, Privredna Banka bought the Wagon and Iron Structures Factory in Kruševac (later "October 14"), of which it was previously a creditor, and which immediately before that went bankrupt. The factory was fundamentally reconstructed and modernized within a year, and jobs were provided for it at the State Railways, in the production of new wagons and iron railway bridges. This investment was the only one in which the money invested was not recouped, and the factory operated at a loss until World War II.

He made a plan for the railway bridge on the Morava. Under his supervision, concrete pillars were erected in the riverbed and a metal structure was made, which the Germans delivered to Svilajnac before the war, and then taken away by the Bulgarians during the Great War.

== Other projects ==
He is mentioned as the director of the State Railways in 1920-1921.

He successfully designed industrial and residential-commercial buildings, mostly designed in the style of academism, with elements of Art Nouveau. He also distinguished himself as a constructor of corner palaces, the Class Lottery (projects together with Milan Kapetanović), on the corner of Vasa Čarapića and Kneginja Ljubica streets (1898—1899), the House of Vračar Savings Bank, according to the project of architect Danilo Vladisavljević, on the corner of Kneza Miloša Street and Kralj Milan (1906) and two houses of his own.

According to his project, Prometna Banka also founded its last interwar company, the sheet metal rolling mill in Zemun. When it was built in 1938, it was a business venture and the crowning achievement of Prometna banka and the Serbian economy.

== Acknowledgments ==
He is the holder of the Order of Saint Sava I degree, the Yugoslav Crown II degree, the White Eagle IV degree and the Cross of the Red Cross Society in Geneva.

Recognition for the entire activity in the field of economy and construction was given to him at the celebration of the fiftieth anniversary of his work, held on 21 October 1939, in the House of the Transport Bank. On the occasion of the celebration, a monument entitled "50 years of work of engineer Miloš Savčić 1889-1939" was published. The celebrant received a silver plaque with his portrait, the work of sculptor Dragomir Arambašić, and copies of the plaque were cast in bronze and placed on marble slabs at the House and buildings of the banking companies.

He died on 9 March 1941, after a long illness, just before the start of World War II. He was buried the next day in the Novo Groblje (New Cemetery) in Belgrade. A good part of what was built was destroyed during the war and after the war, all companies that established the Traffic Bank were transferred to state ownership by the communists who came into power, thanks to the Superpowers.

On the eve of his death, he bequeathed his valuable property, three hectares of land and a share in two mills, to the Serbian Orthodox Church of St. Nicholas in Svilajnac, of which, together with his wife, he was one of the largest donors.

The material on his activity is partially catalogued in the Archives of Serbia and in the Historical Archives of Belgrade, and his professional opus was researched in detail in the 1990s when a radical reaffirmation of his creative personality was initiated. In 2004, a street in the municipality of Savski Venac was named after him.

== Family ==
He had a brother Jakov and a sister Ljubica.

He was married to Katinka, born Leve in Munich in 1874, whom he met while studying. They had sons: architects Milenko (1901–1954) and Svetozar (1903), engineers Ljubiša and Vladeta (1899) and a daughter Jelica (–1936), married to civil engineer Aleksandar Acović.

He had his office in a residential and business multi-storey building at Topličin venac 14 Street. During that upgrade, he was the first in Serbia to apply the Herbst (1921) mezzanine prefabricated reinforced concrete structural system on that building. The system consisted of concrete girders in the form of shorter or longer flat beams (post), which are brought to the building ready-made and laid at a distance of 33 cm upright. Through them are uniformly and continuously concreted svodići to plating of tin plate. He renamed his office the Technical Company "Labor", which was taken over by his son Vladeta and son-in-law Aleksandar Acović.

His family was among the largest shareholders of Agrarna, Vračarska and Izvozna Banka. Prometna Banka had consolidated all the family property. They bought vineyards and turned them into a prestigious residential area in Dedinje. The construction of the luxury villa complex was started by Miloš Savčić, and continued by his son-in-law Aleksandar Acović.

At the beginning of the 1920s, he decided to build the largest and most representative habitat in the prestigious city location, in which he lived for the rest of his life. The building was built from 1924 to 1926, on the corner of Kralj Milan Street and Andrićev venac (then Dobrinjska Street). He determined the spatial organization and dimensions of his own building by applying a system with Herbst girders for mezzanine structures, and the façade assembly, composed of three unequal segments, was designed by Evgeny Gulin, a Russian civil engineer living in exile in Serbia.

During the German occupation, Katinka's wife, although of German origin, refused to cooperate with the Germans, so she was thrown out of the family palace in the city center together with the children and their families. They welcomed the end of the war in vineyard cottages in Dedinje. After the liberation, they were expelled from Dedinje as representatives of the defeated bourgeoisie and their entire property was confiscated.

One of Miloš Savčić's great-grandchildren is Vladimir Lešić, a famous musician.

The house at Užička 15, where his daughter Jelica lived, later became the residence of Josip Broz Tito and then Slobodan Milošević, and a House of Flowers was built nearby on their former estate. All this added insult to injury for the surviving family of Miloš Savčić.

== Works cited ==
- Милош Савчић: градитељ, привредник, градоначелник; изложба Музеја науке и технике, каталог; 1997. COBISS 1024033672
- Тасић, Никола (1995). Антонић, Здравко (ed.). Историја Београда. Балканолошки институт САНУ. ISBN 9788671790215.
- Алексић, Весна (2013). Дугалић, Верољуб (ed.). "Прометна банка а. д. у модернизацијским процесима у Србији у првој половини XX века" (PDF). Банкарство. 1. Београд: Удружење банака Србије. ISSN 2466-5495.
- Шејић, Растко (August 11, 2006). Глас јавности д. д. (ed.). "Владимир Лешић: Заборавили су да је отето проклето". Глас јавности. Београд. Archived from the original on May 9, 2014.
- Недић, Светлана В. (2010). "Дом Прометне банке" (PDF). Наслеђе. XI. Београд: Завод за заштиту споменика културе града Београда. ISSN 2560-3264.
- Недић, Светлана В. (2007). "Зграда Класне лутрије" (PDF). Наслеђе. VIII. Београд: Завод за заштиту споменика културе града Београда. ISSN 2560-3264.
- Кадијевић, Александар (2016). "Палата Милоша Савчића (1924–1926) - нетипична београдска угаона зграда" (PDF). Наслеђе. XVII. Београд: Завод за заштиту споменика културе града Београда. ISSN 2560-3264.
- Бајић, Ђорђе (April 10, 2017). "Премијера филма "Катинка" Мирослава Бате Петровића у ДОБ-у". www.fcs.rs. Београд: Филмски центар Србије.
- Миленовић, Миломир; Тановић, Јован, eds. (March 10, 1941). "Милош Савчић - Инжењер и бивши министар". Политика. 11770. Београд.
- Група аутора (1939). 50 година рада инжењера Милоша Савића: 1889-1939. Београд: Минерва. Archived from the original on January 25, 2018.
- Алексић, Весна (2015). "Структурне промене у приватном банкарском сектору Србије: историјске опомене и препоруке". Структурне промене у Србији: досадашњи резултати и перспективе (PDF). Београд: Институт економских наука. ISBN 978-86-89465-17-4.
- Лазић, Снежана (2015). "Туризам у Београду између два светска рата кроз документа историјског архива у Београду" (PDF). TIMS Acta (часопис). 9. Нови Сад: Факултет за спорт и туризам. ISSN 2406-1344.
- Рославцев, С. (2015). Муслибеговић, Алма (ed.). "Милош Савчић – градитељ и хуманитарац" (PDF). KWH. 495. Београд: Електропривреда Србије: 34–35.
