= Artisans Club Building in Belgrade =

Building in Serbia

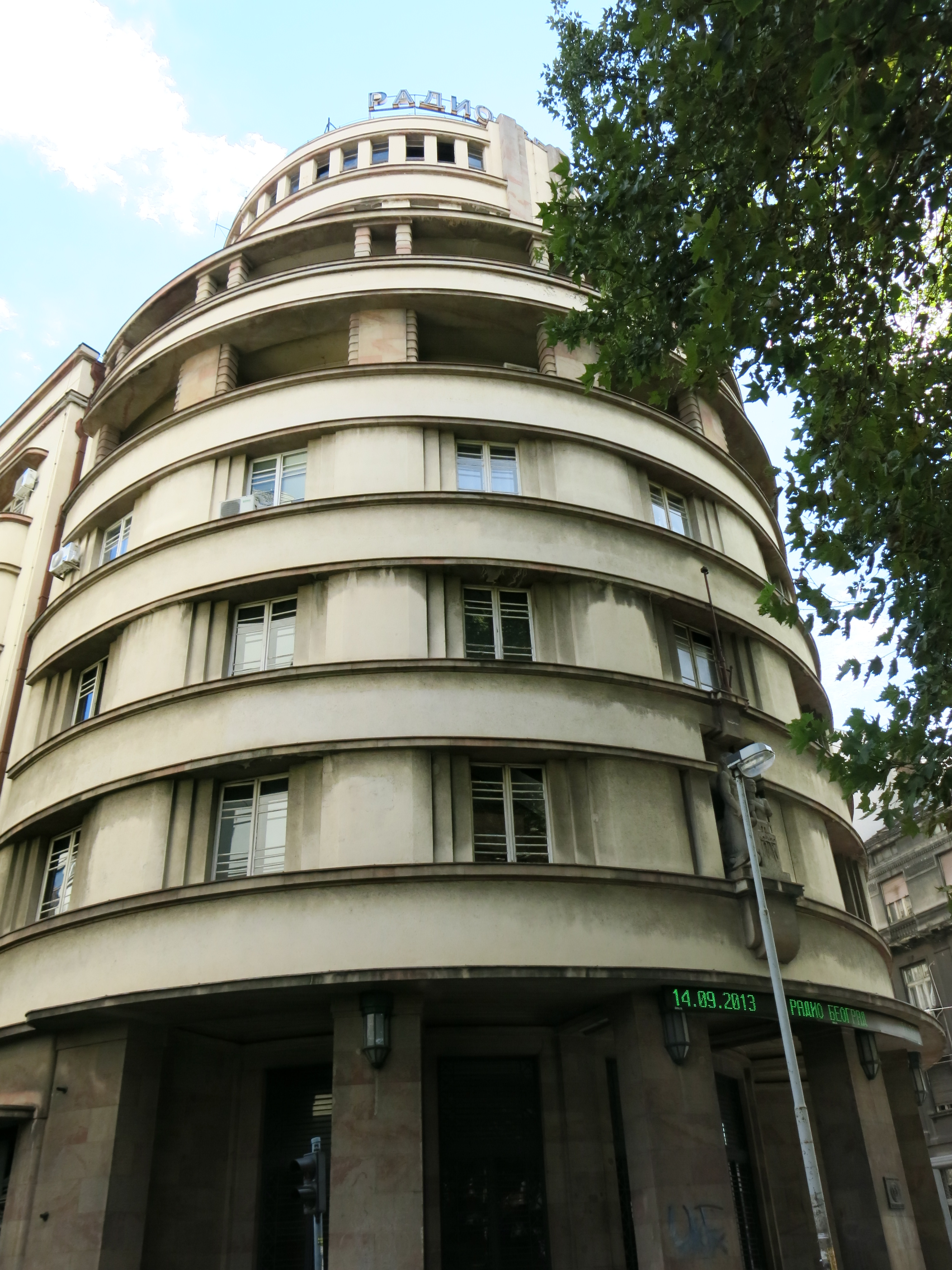
- Artisans Club Building in Belgrade
- Interactive map of the Artisans Club Building in Belgrade area

General information
- Architectural style: Modernism, art deco
- Location: 2, Hilandarska Street, Belgrade, Serbia
- Coordinates: 44°48′55.3″N 20°27′58.08″E
- Construction started: 1914
- Completed: 1 May 1933

Design and construction
- Architects: Danilo Vladisavljević, Bogdan Nestorović

"Artisans Club" building in Belgrade is located in Belgrade, in 2, Hilandarska Street. It was built for the needs of the Craftsmen Association. It represents an immovable cultural property as a сultural monument.

== History ==
Artisans Club was built on the former estate of Jovan Kujundžić, where he once held the bar Kod dva bela goluba. The building where in which this bar worked was built in 1841 and was demolished after the adoption of the project of the construction of the Artisans Club. In memory of this building, Svetogorska Street was named Dva Bela Goluba (Two white doves) for a long time, so as the surrounding neighborhood.

In 1911, the Craftsmen Association founded the Fund of the Artisans Club, and the next year, the land for the construction of the house was purchased. Following the example of other social homes, it aimed to bring together all the previously established handicraft establishments. Such a possibility arose in 1914, when different artisanal funds raised funds and started construction of the home according to the project of the architect Danilo Vladisavljević from 1912. The construction of the Artisans Club was interrupted by the war, but the construction was delayed until 1931, when the design was entrusted to the architect Bogdan Nestorović. The building was completed on 1 May 1933.

== Architecture ==
Artisans Club is designed in the spirit of late Modernism and Art Deco architecture. It was conceived as a corner building with a central tract of circular base and two side wings along Hilandarska and Svetogorska Street. The relation of the curved and flat sides of the central parts was emphasized by the two-storey central tower. The massive angular part of the building is facilitated by a colonnade on the ground floor and the last floor. According to the wish of family Kujundžić, who sold land for the construction of this home, the figures of two white doves are placed on the facade of the building. Namely, the sculptor Nikola Lukaček built a sculptural group Kovač on the facade, a craftsman with his assistant, presented in the form of a young man and a child, the symbol of two young generations, with a few craft tools, hammers, anvils, pliers, сarpenter compasses and scissors, where he placed two white pigeons next to the anvil, and the composition is located above the main entrance to the building, in the central zone of the first floor. Elements of modern style of Art Deco on this monumental building are the purified colonnade of the ground floor and prismatic lanterns (lamps), horizontally connected openings on the floors, stepped wall planes, weaning forms of wreaths and ridges, set sculpture on the console in a specific box for the sculpture, the vertical of the frontal end of the tower, with the inscription "Artisans Club", as well as decorative horizontal accents on parapets and the columns of the upper levels of the tower. This building was one of the most monumental buildings in architecture of Belgrade between the two world wars. Craftsmen called it the "Main House", and the contemporaries described the style of the building as "monumental" and "modern". Today, it is one of the more prominent buildings of the capital. When it opened to the public, there was a café, a restaurant, offices, cinema "Avala", as well as hotel rooms in the Artisans Club. Since 1947, Radio Belgrade is located in the building. The building and interior were on this occasion adapted to the needs of a radio station. Rooms of the restaurant on the ground floor have been transformed into a music and drama studio, and the newsroom has been placed into the former hotel rooms and offices. Due to the special cultural, historical, architectural and urban values, the Artisans Club in Belgrade was declared a cultural monument (Decision, "Official Journal of Belgrade no. 23/84").

== See more ==
- Radio Belgrade
- List of cultural monuments in Belgrade
