= Alibegović =

Alibegović is a surname, derived from Turkish Ali Bey. Notable people with the surname include:

- Amar Alibegović (born 1995), Bosnian-Italian basketball player
- Biserka Alibegović (1932–2017), Croatian theater, television and film actress
- Dubravka Jurlina Alibegović (born 1963), Croatian economist and politician
- Dževad Alibegović (born 1927), Yugoslav film and theater actor
- Nihad Alibegović (born 1962), Bosnian singer
- Teoman Alibegović (born 1967), Bosnian-Slovenian basketball player

== See also ==
- Alibegovići
- Alibegovići
