= Bijelo Brdo =

Bijelo Brdo (lit. 'white hill') may refer to:

- Bijelo Brdo, Croatia, a village near Erdut, Croatia
- Bijelo Brdo, Derventa, a village in Bosnia and Herzegovina
- Bijelo Brdo culture, an early medieval archaeological culture named after the Croatian village
- NK BSK Bijelo Brdo, a Croatian football club based in the village of Bijelo Brdo

== See also ==
- Belo Brdo
