= Stanići, Bosnia and Herzegovina =

Coordinates: 44°55′04″N 18°01′25″E

Stanići
- Village
- Location within Bosnia and Herzegovina
- Country: Bosnia and Herzegovina
- Entity: Republika Srpska
- Municipality: Derventa
- Time zone: UTC+1 (CET)
  - Summer (DST): UTC+2 (CEST)

Stanići is a village in the municipality of Derventa, Bosnia and Herzegovina.
