= Sulejman Medenčević =

Bosnian cinematographer and film producer

Sulejman Medenčević (born 29 October 1963, Derventa, Yugoslavia, present-day Bosnia and Herzegovina) is an internationally recognized Bosnian cinematographer and producer, winner of Best Cinematography Award at 2005 Valencia Festival of Mediterranean Cinema. He went to the National Film School for Dramatic Arts in Belgrade, Yugoslavia and obtained a master's degree in Cinematography from FAMU (Prague, Czech Republic). He is currently living and working in Los Angeles.
