= Gornji Detlak =

- Village
- Location within Bosnia and Herzegovina
- Coordinates: 44°54′06″N 17°49′08″E
- Country: Bosnia and Herzegovina
- Entity: Republika Srpska
- Municipality: Derventa
- Time zone: UTC+1 (CET)
  - Summer (DST): UTC+2 (CEST)

Gornji Detlak (Serbian: Горњи Детлак) is a village in the municipality of Derventa, Bosnia and Herzegovina. A notable person from this village is a musician Saša Savković.
