= Živinice, Derventa =

Živinice
- Village
- Location within Bosnia and Herzegovina
- Coordinates: 44°57′51.12″N 17°56′30.12″E
- Country: Bosnia and Herzegovina
- Entity: Republika Srpska
- Municipality: Derventa
- Time zone: UTC+01:00 (CET)
  - Summer (DST): UTC+02:00 (CEST)

Živinice is a village in the municipality of Derventa, Republika Srpska in northern Bosnia and Herzegovina.
