= Gradina, Derventa =

Gradina
- Village
- Location within Bosnia and Herzegovina
- Coordinates: 44°54′9″N 17°53′38″E
- Country: Bosnia and Herzegovina
- Entity: Republika Srpska
- Municipality: Derventa
- Time zone: UTC+1 (CET)
  - Summer (DST): UTC+2 (CEST)

Gradina (Serbian: Градина) is a village in the municipality of Derventa, south of the town of Derventa, and in the north of Bosnia and Herzegovina.

The surrounding area is very verdant, and the village is mostly forested, and there is farming taking place in the south of the village.

The name Gradina may be derived from the Slavic word of 'Gradina', meaning a fortified town.

From 1929 to 1939, Gradina was part of the Vrbas Banovina and from 1939 to 1941 of the Banovina of Croatia within the Kingdom of Yugoslavia.
