= Bukovica Mala, Derventa =

Bukovica Mala
- Village
- Location within Bosnia and Herzegovina
- Coordinates: 44°59′32″N 18°05′47″E
- Country: Bosnia and Herzegovina
- Entity: Republika Srpska
- Municipality: Derventa
- Time zone: UTC+1 (CET)
  - Summer (DST): UTC+2 (CEST)

Bukovica Mala (Serbian: Буковица Мала) is a village in the municipality of Derventa, Bosnia and Herzegovina.
