= Rapćani =

- Village
- Location within Bosnia and Herzegovina
- Coordinates: 44°58′25″N 17°50′06″E
- Country: Bosnia and Herzegovina
- Entity: Republika Srpska
- Municipality: Derventa
- Time zone: UTC+1 (CET)
  - Summer (DST): UTC+2 (CEST)

Rapćani (Serbian: Рапћани) is a village in the municipality of Derventa, Bosnia and Herzegovina.
