= Kalenderovci Gornji =

- Village
- Location within Bosnia and Herzegovina
- Coordinates: 44°56′N 17°49′E
- Country: Bosnia and Herzegovina
- Entity: Republika Srpska
- Municipality: Derventa
- Time zone: UTC+1 (CET)
  - Summer (DST): UTC+2 (CEST)

Kalenderovci Gornji (Serbian: Календеровци Горњи) is a village in the municipality of Derventa, Bosnia and Herzegovina.
