= Gornja Lupljanica =

- Village
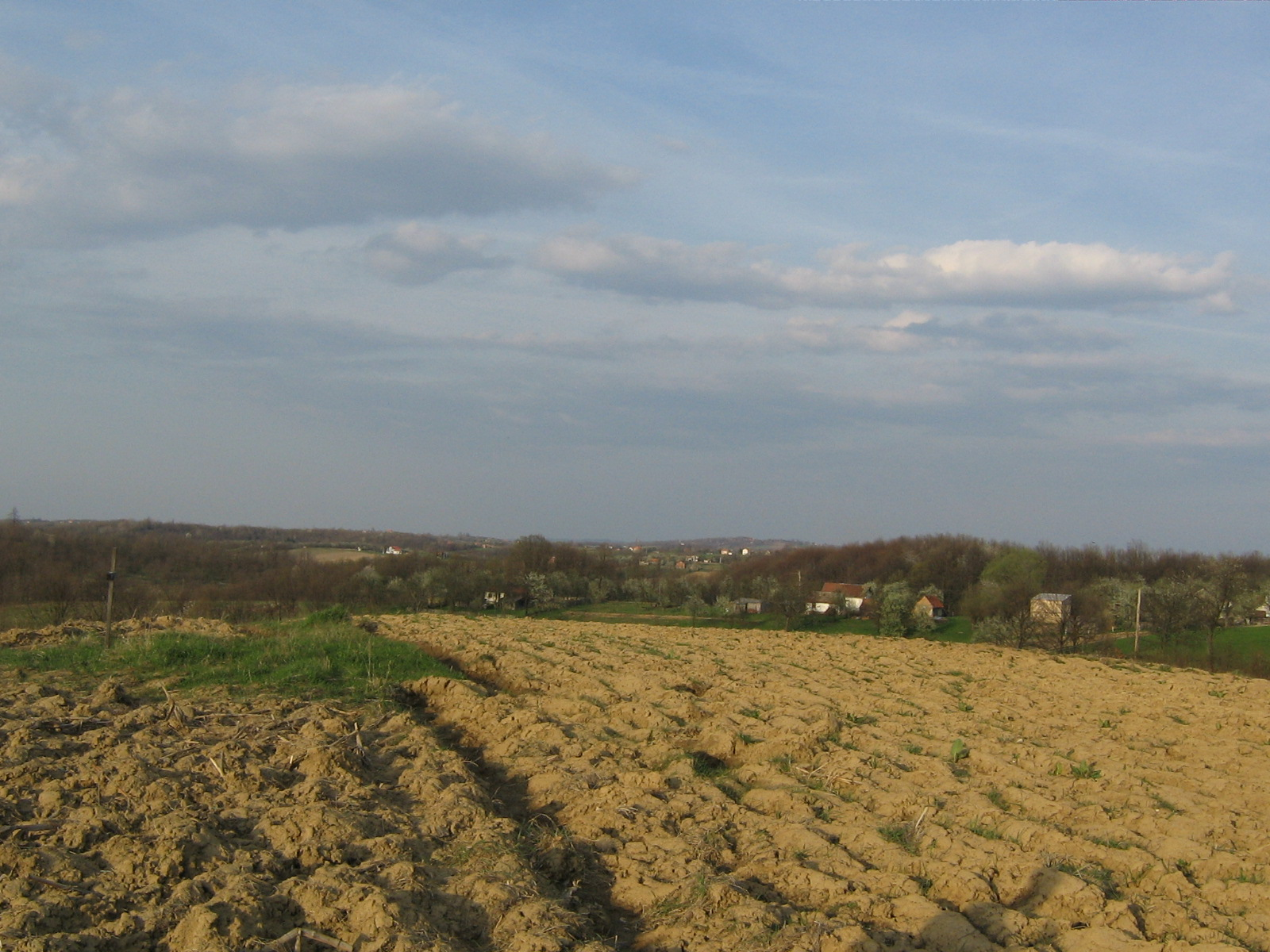

- Location within Bosnia and Herzegovina
- Coordinates: 44°54′52″N 17°54′16″E
- Country: Bosnia and Herzegovina
- Entity: Republika Srpska
- Municipality: Derventa
- Time zone: UTC+1 (CET)
  - Summer (DST): UTC+2 (CEST)

Gornja Lupljanica (Serbian: Горња Лупљаница) is a village in the municipality of Derventa, Bosnia and Herzegovina.
