= Bunar (Derventa) =

- Village
- Location within Bosnia and Herzegovina
- Coordinates: 44°55′50″N 17°59′17″E
- Country: Bosnia and Herzegovina
- Entity: Republika Srpska
- Municipality: Derventa
- Time zone: UTC+1 (CET)
  - Summer (DST): UTC+2 (CEST)

Bunar (Serbian: Бунар) is a village in the municipality of Derventa, Bosnia and Herzegovina.
