= Velika Sočanica =

- Village
- Location within Bosnia and Herzegovina
- Coordinates: 44°52′57″N 17°55′59″E
- Country: Bosnia and Herzegovina
- Entity: Republika Srpska
- Municipality: Derventa
- Time zone: UTC+1 (CET)
  - Summer (DST): UTC+2 (CEST)

Velika Sočanica (Serbian: Велика Сочаница) is a village in the municipality of Derventa, Bosnia and Herzegovina.
