= Gornji Božinci =

- Village
- Location within Bosnia and Herzegovina
- Coordinates: 44°57′N 18°03′E
- Country: Bosnia and Herzegovina
- Entity: Republika Srpska
- Municipality: Derventa
- Time zone: UTC+1 (CET)
  - Summer (DST): UTC+2 (CEST)

Gornji Božinci (Serbian: Горњи Божинци) is a village in the municipality of Derventa, Bosnia and Herzegovina.
