= Miškovci =

- Village
- Location within Bosnia and Herzegovina
- Coordinates: 45.001709°N 17.790241°E
- Country: Bosnia and Herzegovina
- Entity: Republika Srpska
- Municipality: Derventa
- Time zone: UTC+1 (CET)
  - Summer (DST): UTC+2 (CEST)

Miškovci is a village in the municipality of Derventa, Bosnia and Herzegovina located 4 km Northeast of Donji Smrtići.
