= Zoran Rankić =

Serbian actor and writer (1935–2019)

- Зоран Ранкић
- Born: 9 August 1935; Derventa, Kingdom of Yugoslavia
- Died: 9 December 2019 (aged 84); Belgrade, Serbia
- Occupations: Actor, writer

Zoran Rankić (Serbian Cyrillic: Зоран Ранкић; 9 August 1935 – 9 December 2019) was a Serbian actor and writer. He was best known for the controversial role of Chetnik commander Nikola Kalabić in 1981 TV docudrama Poslednji čin and for the role of Žarko Popara in the TV show Srećni ljudi. He died in Belgrade, aged 84.
