= Belo Brdo =

Belo Brdo may refer to:

- Belo Brdo, Belgrade, an archeological site in Serbia
- Belo Brdo mine, a lead and zinc mine in Kosovo
- Belo Brdo, Leposavić, a village in Kosovo near Leposavić

== See also ==
- Bijelo Brdo (disambiguation)
