= Lug (Derventa) =

- Suburb
- Location within Bosnia and Herzegovina
- Coordinates: 44°59′14″N 17°52′14″E
- Country: Bosnia and Herzegovina
- Entity: Republika Srpska
- Municipality: Derventa
- Time zone: UTC+1 (CET)
  - Summer (DST): UTC+2 (CEST)

Lug (Derventa) is a suburb in the municipality of Derventa, Bosnia and Herzegovina.
