= Bosanski Dubočac =

- Village
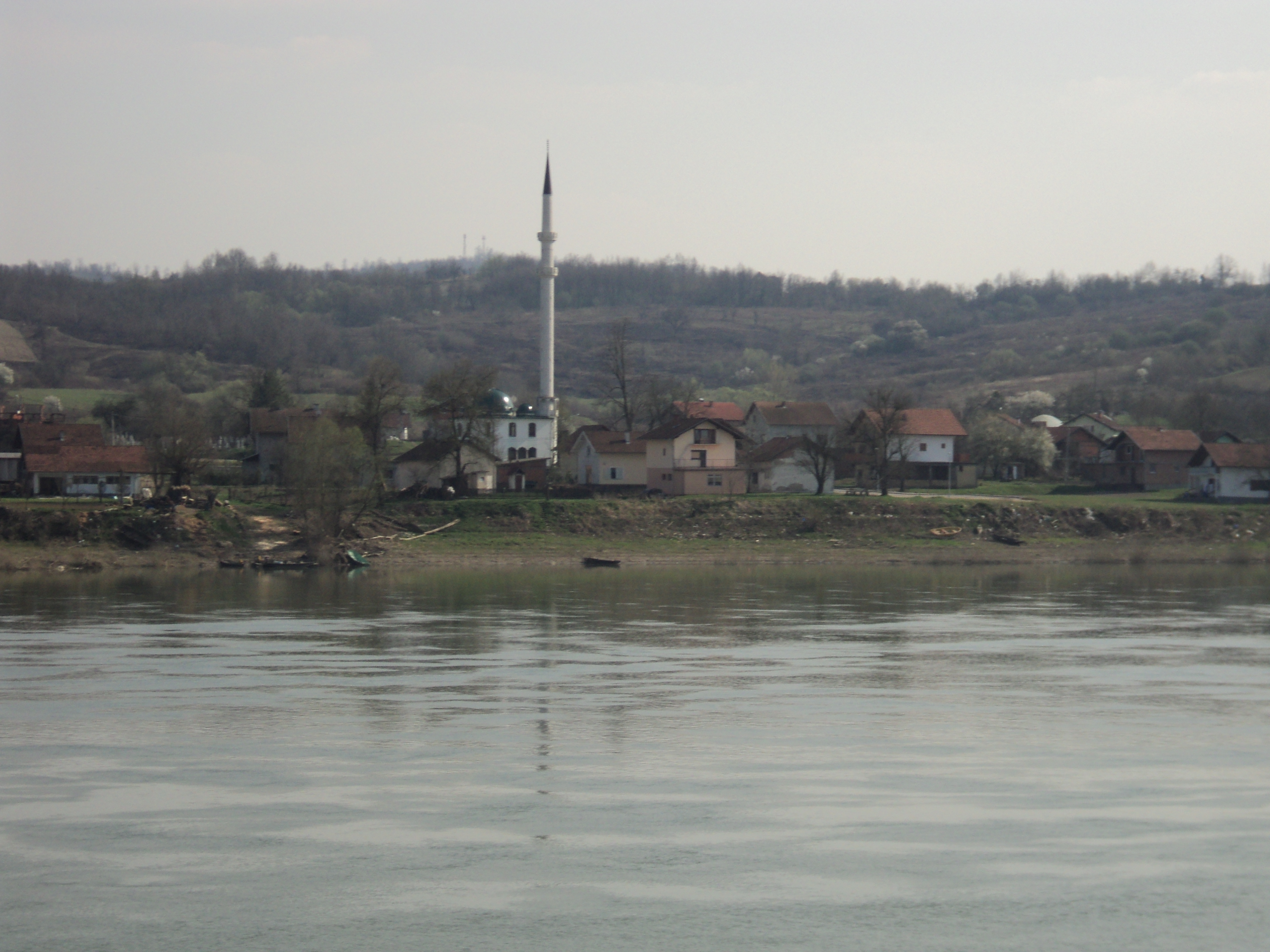

- Location within Bosnia and Herzegovina
- Coordinates: 45°03′N 17°53′E
- Country: Bosnia and Herzegovina
- Entity: Republika Srpska
- Municipality: Derventa
- Time zone: UTC+1 (CET)
  - Summer (DST): UTC+2 (CEST)

Bosanski Dubočac (Serbian: Босански Дубочац) is a village in the municipality of Derventa, Bosnia and Herzegovina.
