= Gradac, Derventa =

Gradac
- Village
- Location within Bosnia and Herzegovina
- Coordinates: 45°01′16″N 17°55′55″E
- Country: Bosnia and Herzegovina
- Entity: Republika Srpska
- Municipality: Derventa
- Time zone: UTC+1 (CET)
  - Summer (DST): UTC+2 (CEST)

Gradac (Serbian: Градац) is a village in the municipality of Derventa, Bosnia and Herzegovina.
