= Kulina (Derventa) =

- Village
- Location within Bosnia and Herzegovina
- Coordinates: 44.9728°N 18.0325°E
- Country: Bosnia and Herzegovina
- Entity: Republika Srpska
- Municipality: Derventa
- Before the 1992 war majority of population of Kulina were ethnic Croatians with small minority ethnic Serbians.
- Time zone: UTC+1 (CET)
  - Summer (DST): UTC+2 (CEST)

Kulina (Serbian: Кулина) is a village in the municipality of Derventa, Bosnia and Herzegovina.
