= Velika, Bosnia and Herzegovina =

Velika
- Village
- Location within Bosnia and Herzegovina
- Coordinates: 44°54′41″N 18°00′04″E
- Country: Bosnia and Herzegovina
- Entity: Republika Srpska
- Municipality: Derventa

Population (1991)
  - Total: 213
- Time zone: UTC+1 (CET)
  - Summer (DST): UTC+2 (CEST)

Velika (Serbian: Bелика) is a village in the municipality of Derventa, Bosnia and Herzegovina.

== Demographics ==
=== 1991 ===
213 total

- ethnic Muslims - 207 (97,18%)
- ethnic Yugoslavs - 4 (1,88%)
- Croats - 1 (0,46%)
- Serb - 1 (0,46%)
