= Donja Lupljanica =

- Village
- Location within Bosnia and Herzegovina
- Coordinates: 44°55′17″N 17°51′24″E
- Country: Bosnia and Herzegovina
- Entity: Bosnia and Herzegovina
- Municipality: Derventa
- Time zone: UTC+1 (CET)
  - Summer (DST): UTC+2 (CEST)

Donja Lupljanica (Serbian: Доња Лупљаница) is a village in the municipality of Derventa, Bosnia and Herzegovina.
