= Agarovići =

- Village
- Location within Bosnia and Herzegovina
- Coordinates: 43°52′15″N 19°09′32″E
- Country: Bosnia and Herzegovina
- Entity: Republika Srpska
- Municipality: Rogatica
- Time zone: UTC+1 (CET)
  - Summer (DST): UTC+2 (CEST)

Agarovići (Serbian: Агаровићи) is a village in the Republika Srpska, Bosnia and Herzegovina. According to the 1991 census, the village is located in the municipality of Rogatica.
