= Lužany (Jičín District) =

- Municipality
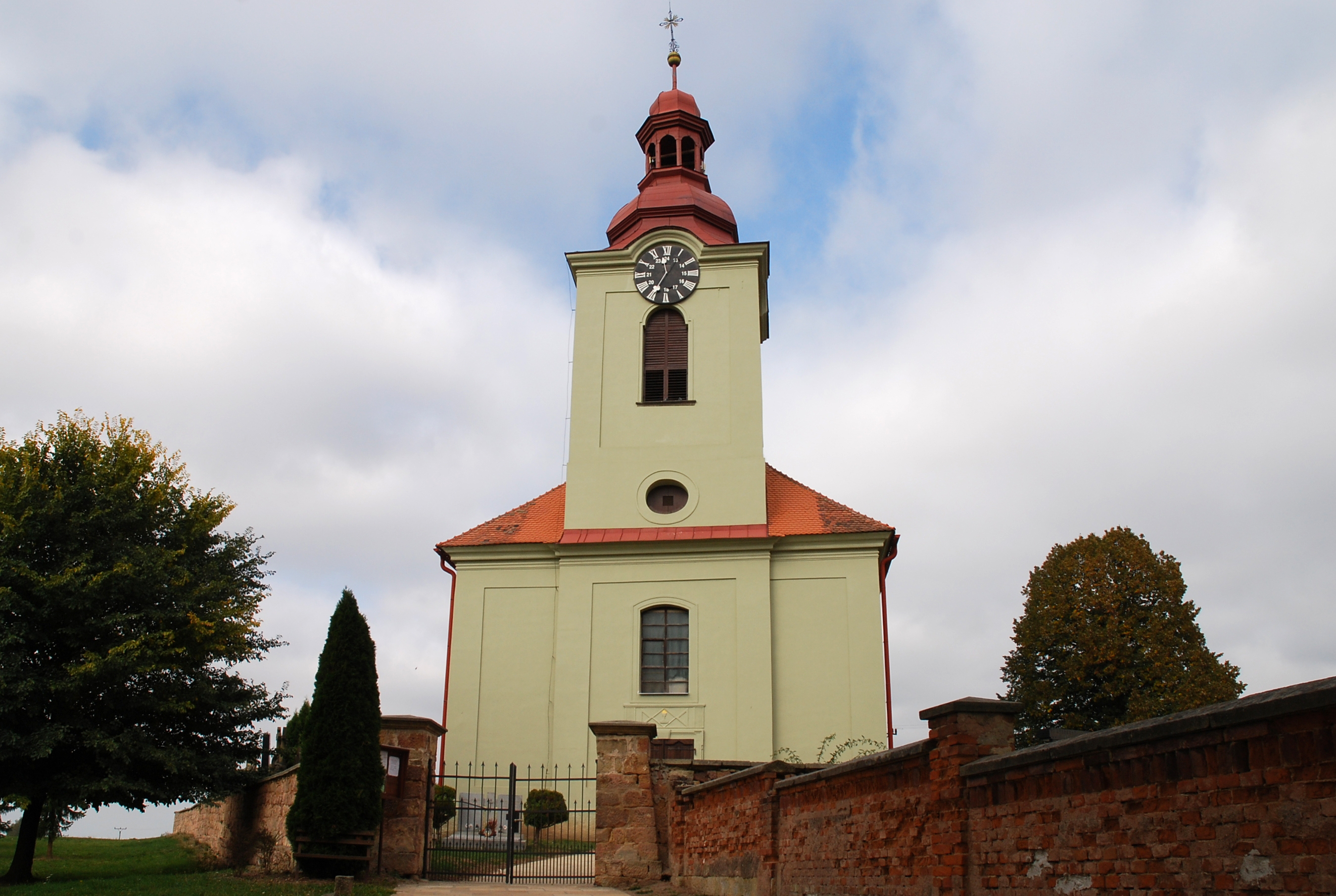
- Church of Saint Mary Magdalene

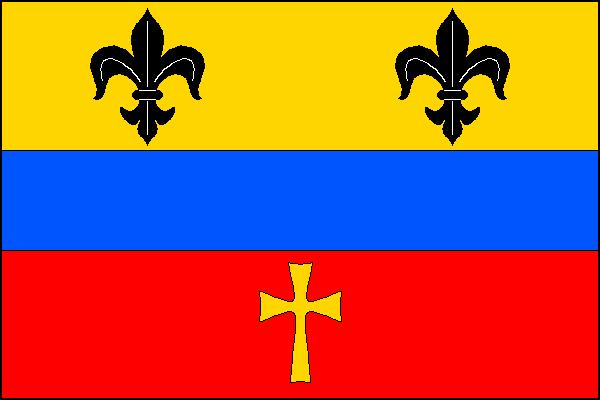
- Flag Coat of arms

- Location in the Czech Republic
- Coordinates: 50°25′52″N 15°28′13″E
- Country: Czech Republic
- Region: Hradec Králové
- District: Jičín
- First mentioned: 1052

Area
  - Total: 12.49 km^{2} (4.82 sq mi)
- Elevation: 310 m (1,020 ft)

Population (2026-01-01)
  - Total: 618
  - Density: 49.5/km^{2} (128/sq mi)
- Time zone: UTC+1 (CET)
  - Summer (DST): UTC+2 (CEST)
- Postal code: 507 06
- Website: www.luzany.cz

Lužany is a municipality and village in Jičín District in the Hradec Králové Region of the Czech Republic. It has about 600 inhabitants.

== Demographics ==
Historical population
Year	Pop.	±%
1869	1,264	—
1880	1,200	−5.1%
1890	1,140	−5.0%
1900	1,038	−8.9%
1910	948	−8.7%
1921	844	−11.0%
1930	836	−0.9%
1950	641	−23.3%
1961	608	−5.1%
1970	572	−5.9%
1980	502	−12.2%
1991	463	−7.8%
2001	537	+16.0%
2011	571	+6.3%
2021	571	+0.0%
Source: Censuses
