= Lužani Novi =

Lužani Novi Лужани Нови
- Village
- Location within Bosnia and Herzegovina
- Coordinates: 45°0′56″N 17°57′53″E
- Country: Bosnia and Herzegovina
- Entity: Republika Srpska
- Municipality: Derventa
- Time zone: UTC+1 (CET)
  - Summer (DST): UTC+2 (CEST)

Lužani Novi (Serbian Cyrillic: Лужани Нови) is a village in the municipality of Derventa, Bosnia and Herzegovina.
