= Lužany pri Topli =

- Municipality
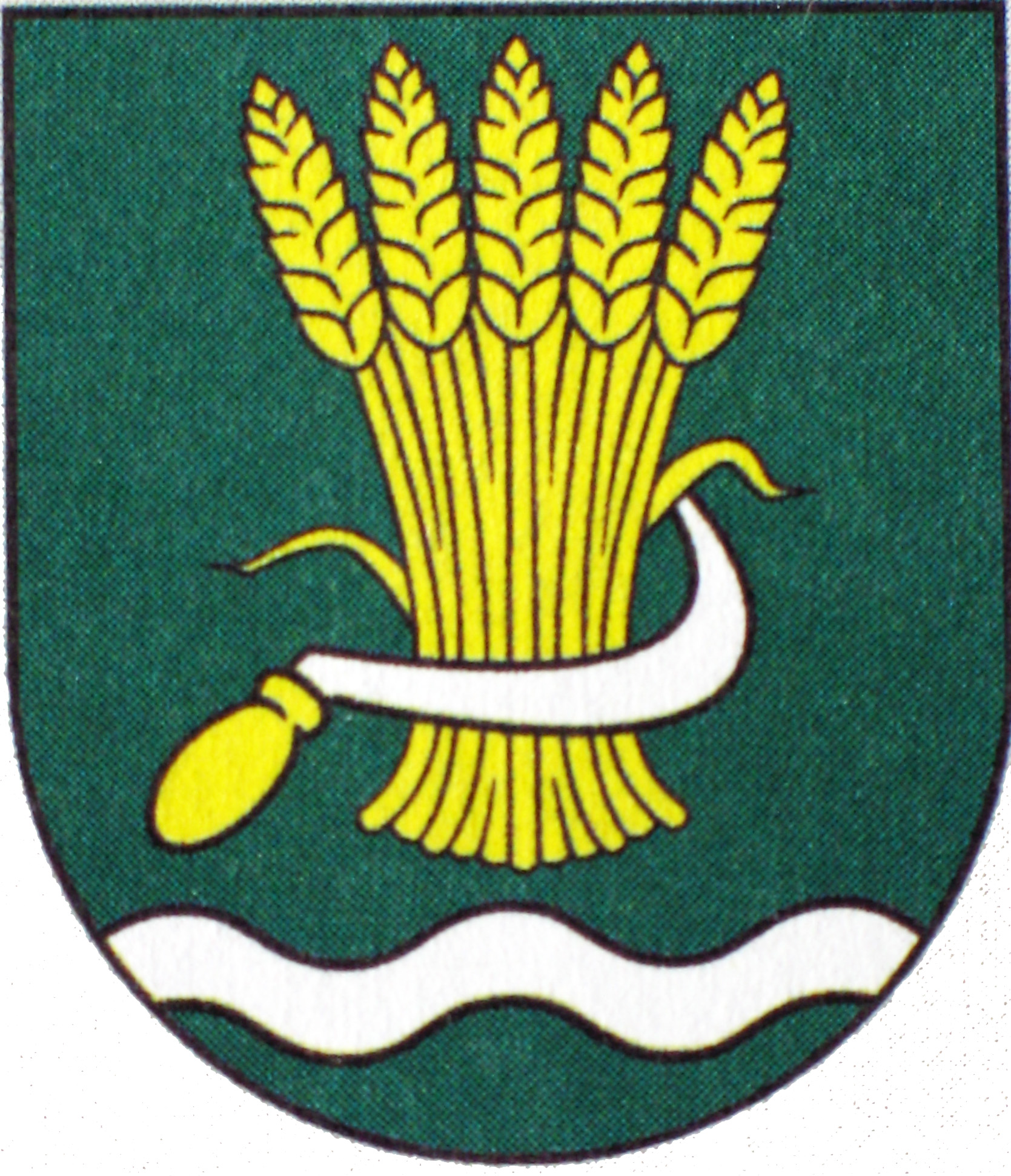
- Flag Coat of arms

- Location of Lužany pri Topli in the Prešov Region Location of Lužany pri Topli in Slovakia
- Coordinates: 49.12°N 21.50°E
- Country: Slovakia
- Region: Prešov Region
- District: Svidník District
- First mentioned: 1399

Area
  - Total: 3.23 km^{2} (1.25 sq mi)
- Elevation: 180 m (590 ft)

Population (2025)
  - Total: 246
- Time zone: UTC+1 (CET)
  - Summer (DST): UTC+2 (CEST)
- Postal code: 870 1
- Area code: +421 54
- Vehicle registration plate (until 2022): SK
- Website: www.luzanypritopli.sk

Lužany pri Topli (Hungarian: Long) is a village and municipality in Svidník District in the Prešov Region of north-eastern Slovakia.

== History ==
In historical records the village was first mentioned in 1399.

== Geography ==
The municipality lies at an altitude of 180 metres (590 ft) and covers an area of 3.23 km^{2} (1.25 sq mi) (2025).

== Population ==
Population statistic (10 years)
Year	1995	2005	2015	2025
Count	249	255	258	246
Difference		+2.40%	+1.17%	−4.65%

Population statistic
Year	2024	2025
Count	247	246
Difference		−0.40%

It has a population of 246 people (31 December 2025).

=== Ethnicity ===
Census 2021 (1+ %)
Ethnicity	Number	Fraction
Slovak	246	99.19%
Total	248	

In year 2021 was 248 people by ethnicity 246 as Slovak, 2 as Czech, 2 as Rusyn and 1 as Not found out.

Note on population: The difference values of population numbers in the table "Population statistic" and in the sections "Ethnicity" & "Religion" is caused by the use of various statistical methods.

=== Religion ===
Census 2021 (1+ %)
Religion	Number	Fraction
Evangelical Church	162	65.32%
Roman Catholic Church	66	26.61%
Greek Catholic Church	10	4.03%
None	9	3.63%
Total	248	

In year 2021 was 248 people by religion 162 from Evangelical Church, 66 from Roman Catholic Church, 10 from Greek Catholic Church, 9 from None and 1 from Eastern Orthodox Church.
