= Arslanagića Most =

Arslanagića Most Арсланагића Мост
- Village
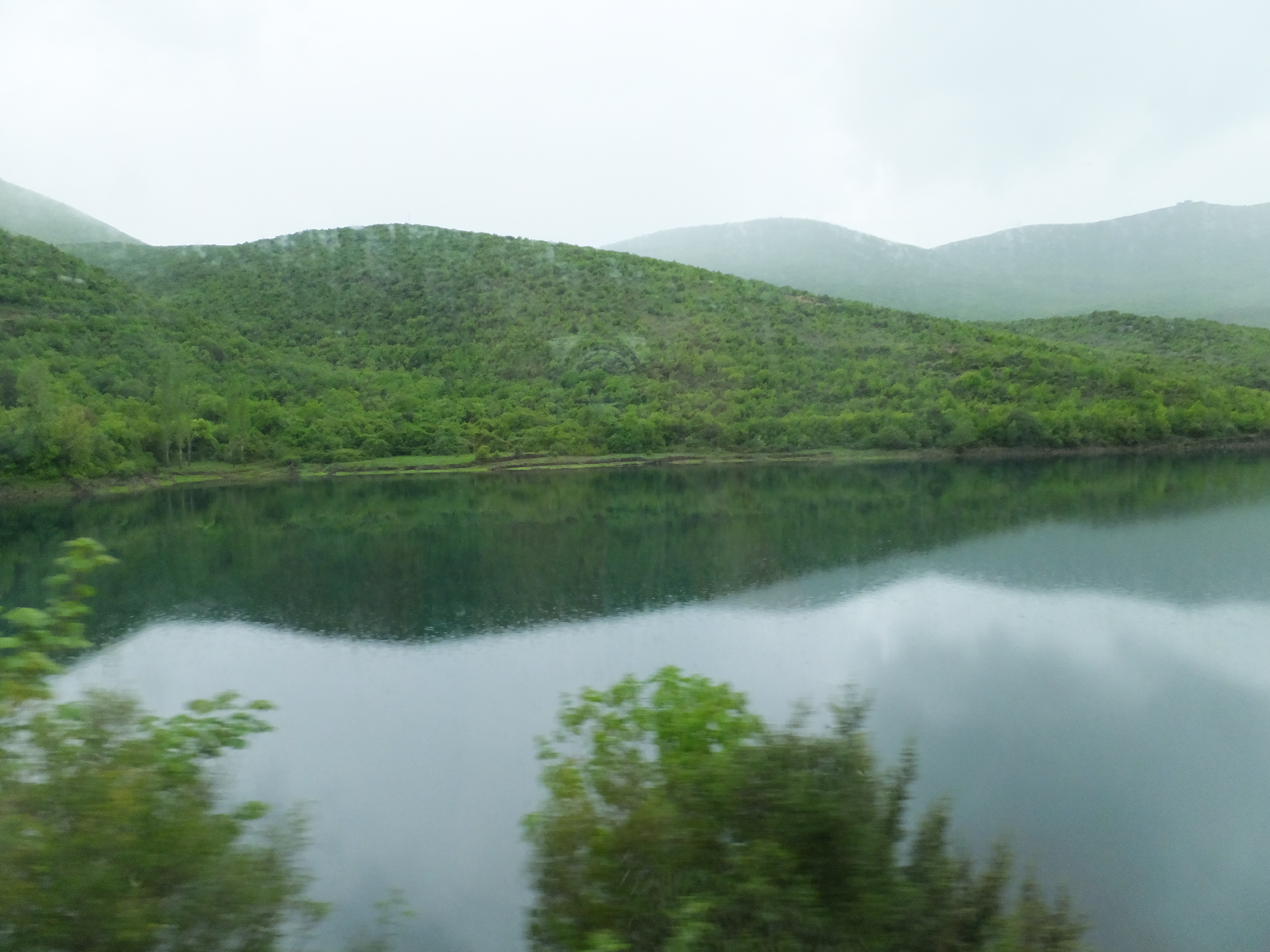
- Aslanagić Bridge in September 2010.

- Location within Bosnia and Herzegovina
- Coordinates: 42.70672144674748°N 18.392775285402465°E
- Country: Bosnia and Herzegovina
- Entity: Republika Srpska
- Municipality: Trebinje
- Time zone: UTC+1 (CET)
  - Summer (DST): UTC+2 (CEST)

Arslanagića Most (Serbian Cyrillic: Арсланагића Мост) is a village in the municipality of Trebinje, Republika Srpska, Bosnia and Herzegovina.
