= Brezici (Derventa) =

- Village
- Location within Bosnia and Herzegovina
- Coordinates: 44.9028°N 18.0239°E
- Country: Bosnia and Herzegovina
- Entity: Republika Srpska
- Municipality: Derventa
- Time zone: UTC+1 (CET)
  - Summer (DST): UTC+2 (CEST)

Brezici (Serbian: Брезици) is a village in the municipality of Derventa, Bosnia and Herzegovina.
