= Lužani, Derventa =

Turski Lužani
- Village
- Location within Bosnia and Herzegovina
- Coordinates: 44°58′52″N 17°51′27″E
- Country: Bosnia and Herzegovina
- Municipality: Derventa
- Time zone: UTC+1 (CET)
  - Summer (DST): UTC+2 (CEST)

Turski Lužani (Serbian: Лужани) is a village in the municipality of Derventa, Bosnia and Herzegovina.
