= Bijelo Brdo, Derventa =

Bijelo Brdo
- Village
- Location within Bosnia and Herzegovina
- Coordinates: 45°01′35″N 17°54′30″E
- Country: Bosnia and Herzegovina
- Entity: Republika Srpska
- Municipality: Derventa
- Time zone: UTC+1 (CET)
  - Summer (DST): UTC+2 (CEST)

Bijelo Brdo (Serbian: Бијело Брдо) is a village in the municipality of Derventa, Bosnia and Herzegovina.
