= Luzan (surname) =

Luzan is a surname. Notable people include:

- Ignacio de Luzán (1702–1754) Spanish critic and poet
- José Luzán (1710–1785), Spanish painter
- Liudmyla Luzan (born 1997), Ukrainian sprint canoeist
- Yelyzaveta Luzan (born 2003), Ukrainian-born Azerbaijani gymnast
