= Danilo Vladisavljević =

Serbian architect

Danilo Vladisavljević (Данило Владисављевић; Donji Milanovac, 16 April 1871 - Belgrade, 5 January 1923) was a Serbian architect in the transition period from the 19th to 20th century. He is remembered to have contributed to the uniqueness of the Belgrade urban core.

== Biography ==
Danilo Vladisavljević finished his elementary schooling in Donji Milanovac and Pančevo, gymnasium in Belgrade, and later went to study architecture in Munich in 1889. At the Munich Polytechnic, Vladisavljević enrolled in the course of the construction at "Hochbau-Abteilung", graduating in 1894. In 1895 he first began a collaboration with engineer Miloš Savčić, in whose office he worked until 1898 before being hired by the Ministry of War as an engineer and architect. That same year he became a member of the Association of Serbian Artists. In 1899, he married Ljubica Mesanović (the daughter of a famous Belgrade merchant Kosta Mesanović) with whom he had three children (two boys and a girl). Along with three other architects (Vladimir Petković, Branko Tanazević and Andra Stevanović), Vladisavljević took part in the "Fourth Art Exhibition" organized in Belgrade in 1912. At the exhibition, he displayed the project of a Military Hospital in Belgrade with a sketch of a barrack, and a project for a Surgical Pavilion. When World War I began, he sent his wife and children to Salonica. After suffering the Great Retreat across the Albanian mountains in late 1915, he joined his family in early 1916 in Salonica. Then, Vladisavljević sent his family to Nice while he went with the Serbian government to Corfu. In late 1917 he joined his family in Nice where he remained until 1918 when he was sent to Paris as an engineer and forensic expert of the Serbian government to ascertain the damages caused by the war. The consequences of the war left a significant impression on Vladisavljević. In 1921, he retired from the Ministry of War, though he continued his activity in the Association of Engineers and Architects of the Kingdom of Serbs, Croats and Slovenes.

Danilo Vladisavljević died on 5 January 1923. He was buried in the family tomb at Novo Groblje in Belgrade. Despite the premature death, he left an imposing opus of architectural works.

== Opus ==
Among the many projects was his family house, built for himself and his wife Ljubica and their sons Lazar and Vladislav and daughter Bela at 57 Gospodar Jevremova Street. In terms of typology, the house belongs to corner buildings, with less prominent angles, almost square in plan. The facades, executed in the Art Nouveau style, with wrought-iron decoration, corresponded to the spirit of the time; new artistic trends started developing in Belgrade at the beginning of the 20th century. He, like many of his contemporaries in the profession, built various residential buildings for influential citizens and implemented pioneering urban projects in Belgrade and area, for example, the Military Hospital Complex in Vračar; facilities for military purposes such as the military barracks in Niš, Valjevo and Smederevska Palanka; and two hotels in the prestigious centre core of Belgrade – the "Hotel Splendid" and the "Hotel Union" which continue to be cultural and tourist landmarks there. Particularly fruitful was his collaboration with the engineer Miloš Savčić on multi-storey outlet buildings such as The Trade and Export Bank at Terazije 5, Vračar Savings Bank (ex-Premetna) at Kneza Mihaila 26 and the industrial complex of the Belgrade Slaughterhouse. During this cooperation, Danilo Vladisavljević was responsible for the facades and for further development of Miloš Savčić’s designs. In 1908, he collaborated with architect Svetozar Jovanović on the Officers’ Cooperative Building at Masarikova 2 in Belgrade which exemplifies one of the most representative Secession art in architecture in Belgrade.

In the process of transforming public spaces in Belgrade, architect Vladisavljević particularly gave important contributions through cooperation with Miloš Savčić in the realization of the complex of Belgrade's first industrial Slaughterhouse in Karaburma district as well as the pioneering urban complex of the Military Hospital in Belgrade.

== See also ==
- List of Serbian architects
