= Lužany (Hradec Králové District) =

- Municipality
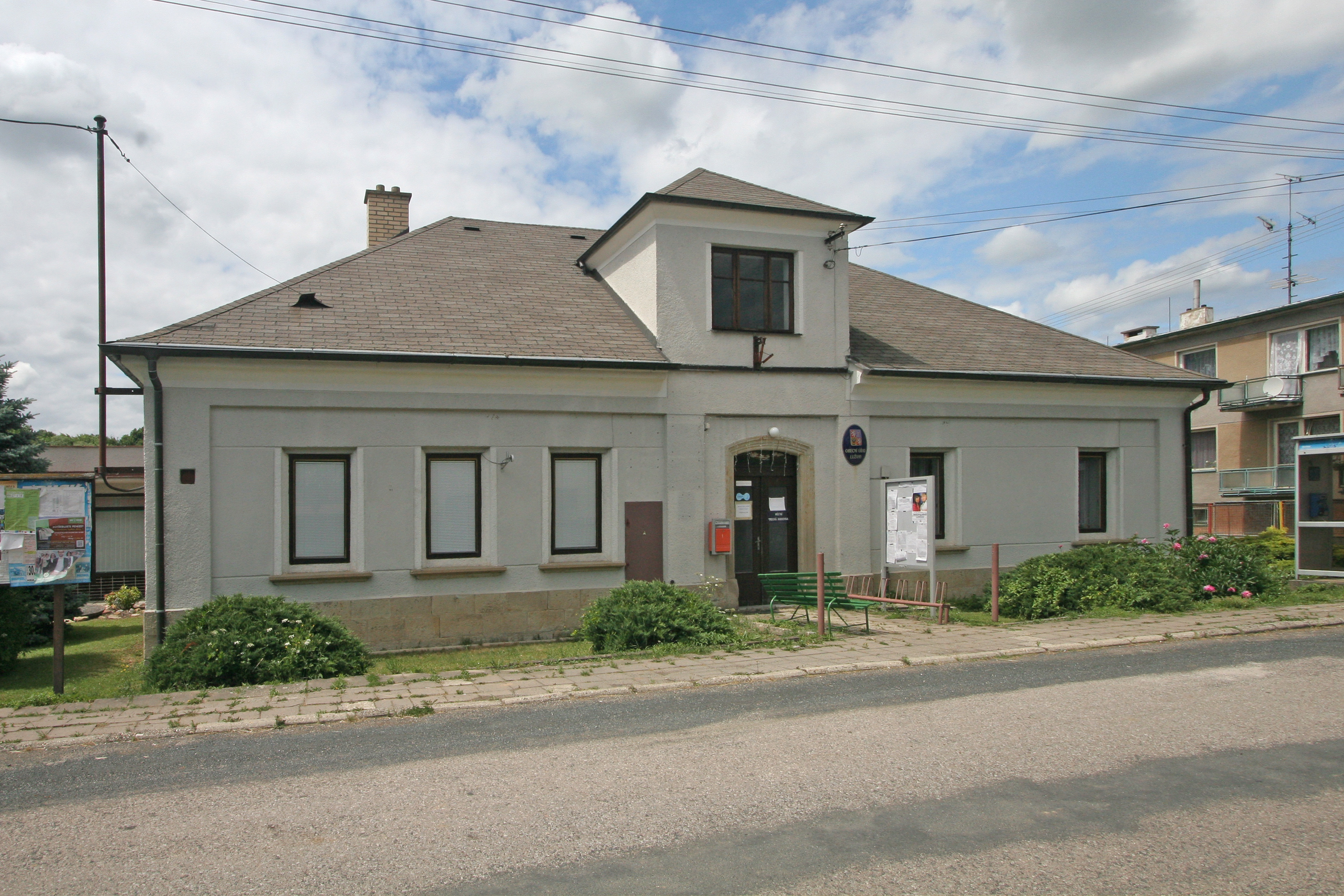
- Municipal office

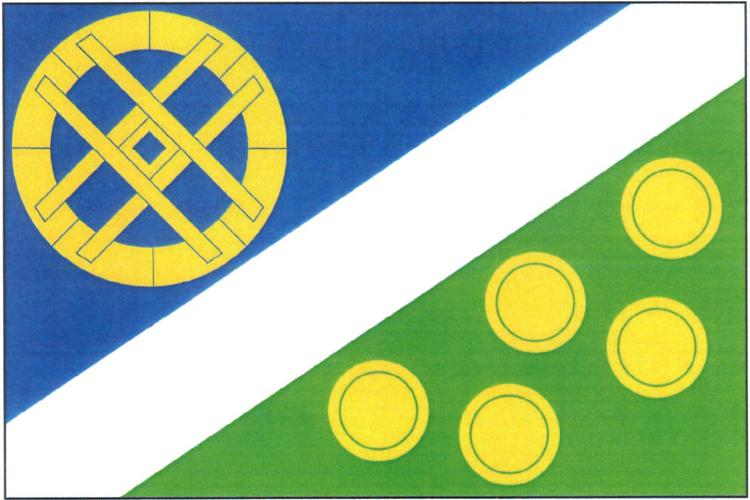
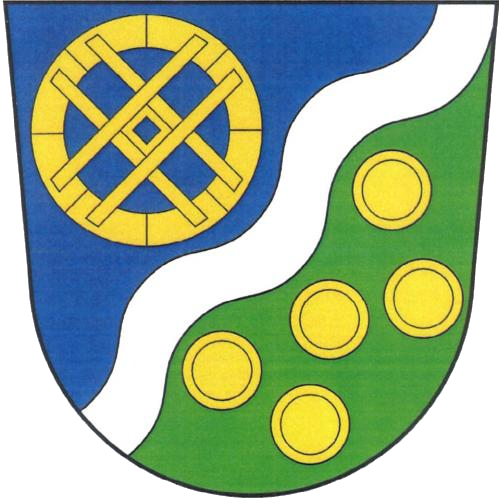
- Flag Coat of arms

- Location in the Czech Republic
- Coordinates: 50°20′17″N 15°47′21″E
- Country: Czech Republic
- Region: Hradec Králové
- District: Hradec Králové
- First mentioned: 1394

Area
  - Total: 3.36 km^{2} (1.30 sq mi)
- Elevation: 254 m (833 ft)

Population (2026-01-01)
  - Total: 119
  - Density: 35.4/km^{2} (91.7/sq mi)
- Time zone: UTC+1 (CET)
  - Summer (DST): UTC+2 (CEST)
- Postal code: 503 05
- Website: www.luzanynt.cz

Lužany is a municipality and village in Hradec Králové District in the Hradec Králové Region of the Czech Republic. It has about 100 inhabitants.

== Demographics ==
Historical population
| Year | Pop. | ±% |
|---|---|---|
| 1869 | 389 | — |
| 1880 | 380 | −2.3% |
| 1890 | 367 | −3.4% |
| 1900 | 330 | −10.1% |
| 1910 | 310 | −6.1% |
| 1921 | 299 | −3.5% |
| 1930 | 289 | −3.3% |
| 1950 | 174 | −39.8% |
| 1961 | 147 | −15.5% |
| 1970 | 152 | +3.4% |
| 1980 | 154 | +1.3% |
| 1991 | 139 | −9.7% |
| 2001 | 136 | −2.2% |
| 2011 | 131 | −3.7% |
| 2021 | 124 | −5.3% |
Source: Censuses
