= Alibegovci =

Alibegovci Алибеговци
- Village
- Location within Bosnia and Herzegovina
- Coordinates: 44°41′36″N 18°00′28″E
- Country: Bosnia and Herzegovina
- Entity: Federation of Bosnia and Herzegovina
- Canton: Zenica-Doboj
- Municipality: Usora

Area
  - Total: 2.14 sq mi (5.54 km^{2})

Population (2013)
  - Total: 1,034
  - Density: 483/sq mi (187/km^{2})
- Time zone: UTC+1 (CET)
  - Summer (DST): UTC+2 (CEST)

Alibegovci (Cyrillic: Алибеговци) is a village in the municipality of Usora, Bosnia and Herzegovina.

== Demographics ==
According to the 2013 census, its population was 1,034.

Ethnicity in 2013
Ethnicity	Number	Percentage
Croats	885	85.6%
Bosniaks	135	13.1%
Serbs	8	0.8%
other/undeclared	6	0.6%
Total	1,034	100%
