= Derventa =

City in Republika Srpska, Bosnia and Herzegovina

Derventa Дервента (Serbian)
- City
- Grad Derventa; Град Дервента; City of Derventa
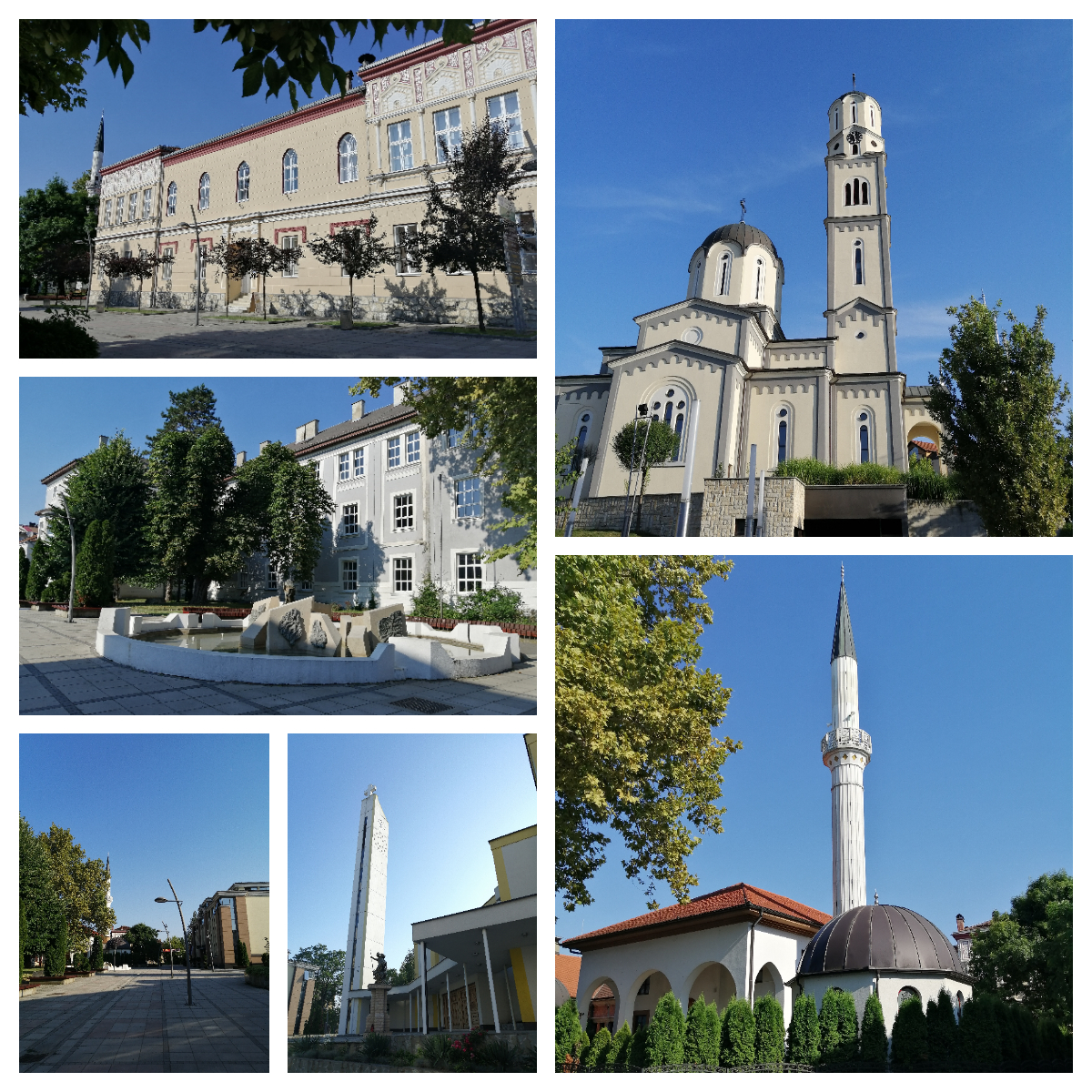
- Collage of Derventa

- Flag Seal

- Location of Derventa within Republika Srpska

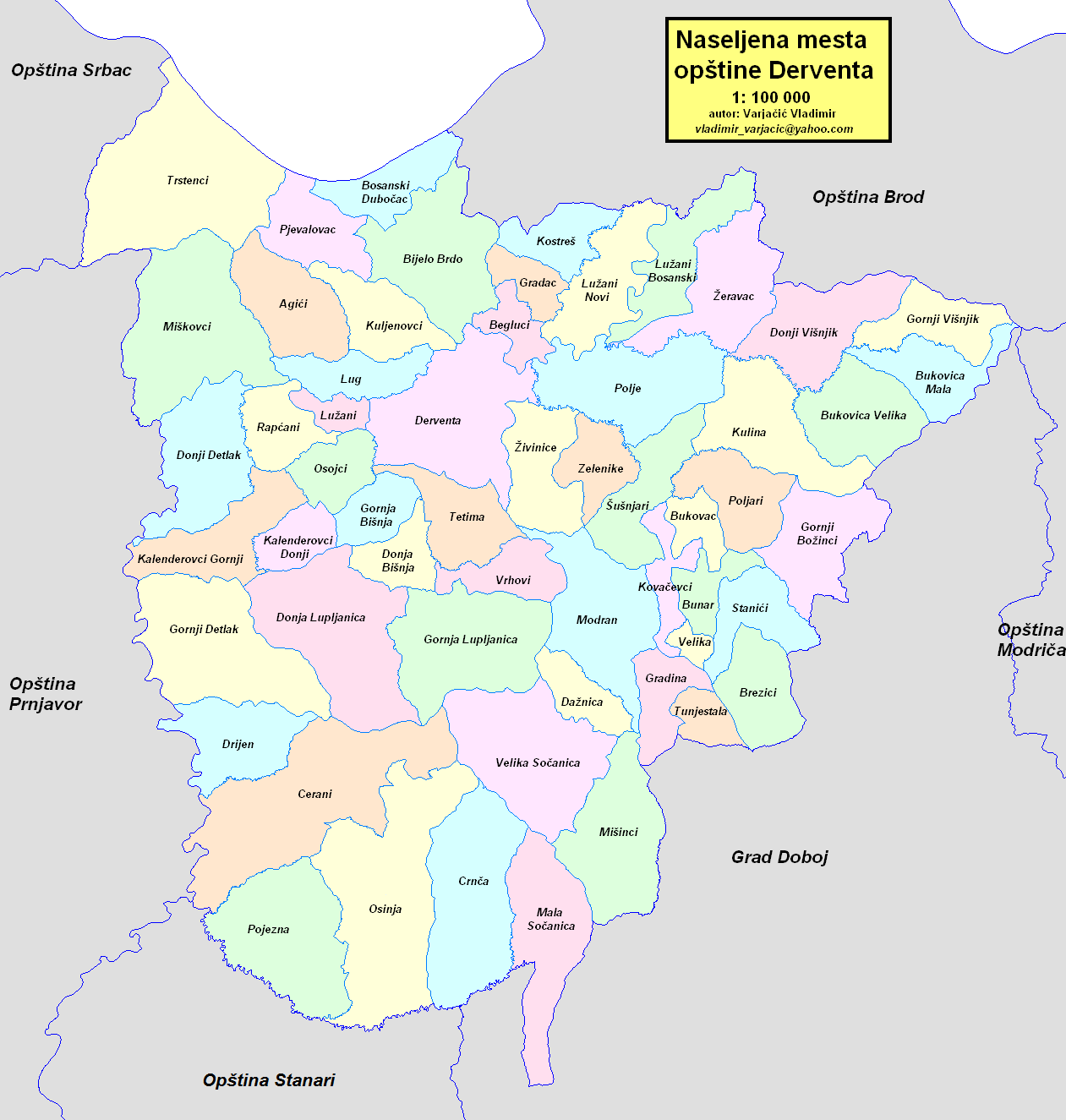
- Coordinates: 44°58′39″N 17°54′27″E
- Country: Bosnia and Herzegovina
- Entity: Republika Srpska
- Geographical region: Posavina

Government
  - Mayor: Igor Žunić (SNSD)
  - City: 516.84 km^{2} (199.55 sq mi)

Population (2013 census)
  - Urban: 11,631
  - City: 27,404
  - City density: 53.022/km^{2} (137.33/sq mi)
- Time zone: UTC+1 (CET)
  - Summer (DST): UTC+2 (CEST)
- Area code: +387 53
- Website: www.derventa.ba

Derventa (Serbian Cyrillic: Дервента) is a city in Bosnia and Herzegovina. It is situated in the Posavina region, northwest of the city of Doboj. As of 2013, the town has a total of 11,631 inhabitants, while the municipality has 27,404 inhabitants.

== Geography ==
The Derventa municipality borders Brod, Modriča, Doboj, Stanari, Prnjavor and Srbac, as well as Croatia across the Sava river. It has an area of 517 km^{2} (200 sq mi).

The town of Derventa lies on the river Ukrina, and roads lead from it to Brod, Kotorsko (Doboj), Prnjavor (Banja Luka) and Srbac.

The town has a suburb called Derventski Lug, which has grown substantially in recent years due to the growth of the municipality.

== History ==
From 1929 to 1939, Derventa was part of the Vrbas Banovina and from 1939 to 1941 of the Banovina of Croatia within the Kingdom of Yugoslavia.

Prior to the Bosnian War, there was a significant population of ethnic Croats within Derventa, while the majority were Bosniaks. When the war started, some of the prominent Serbs within the town took up certain positions of power. During the war, the major fighting factions were the HVO and the VRS, with some units from the ARBiH participating in the conflict. The HVO controlled the town for a short period in the early stages of the war. The HVO eventually lost control of Derventa after Operacija Koridor '92 by the VRS and they were pushed up north, and as a result of the battle most of the Croats and Bosniaks were ethnically cleansed from the area, and Serb refugees from war-affected regions shortly settled in the town.

After the Dayton Agreement in 1995, some Bosniak and Croat refugees returned to Derventa.

== Settlements ==
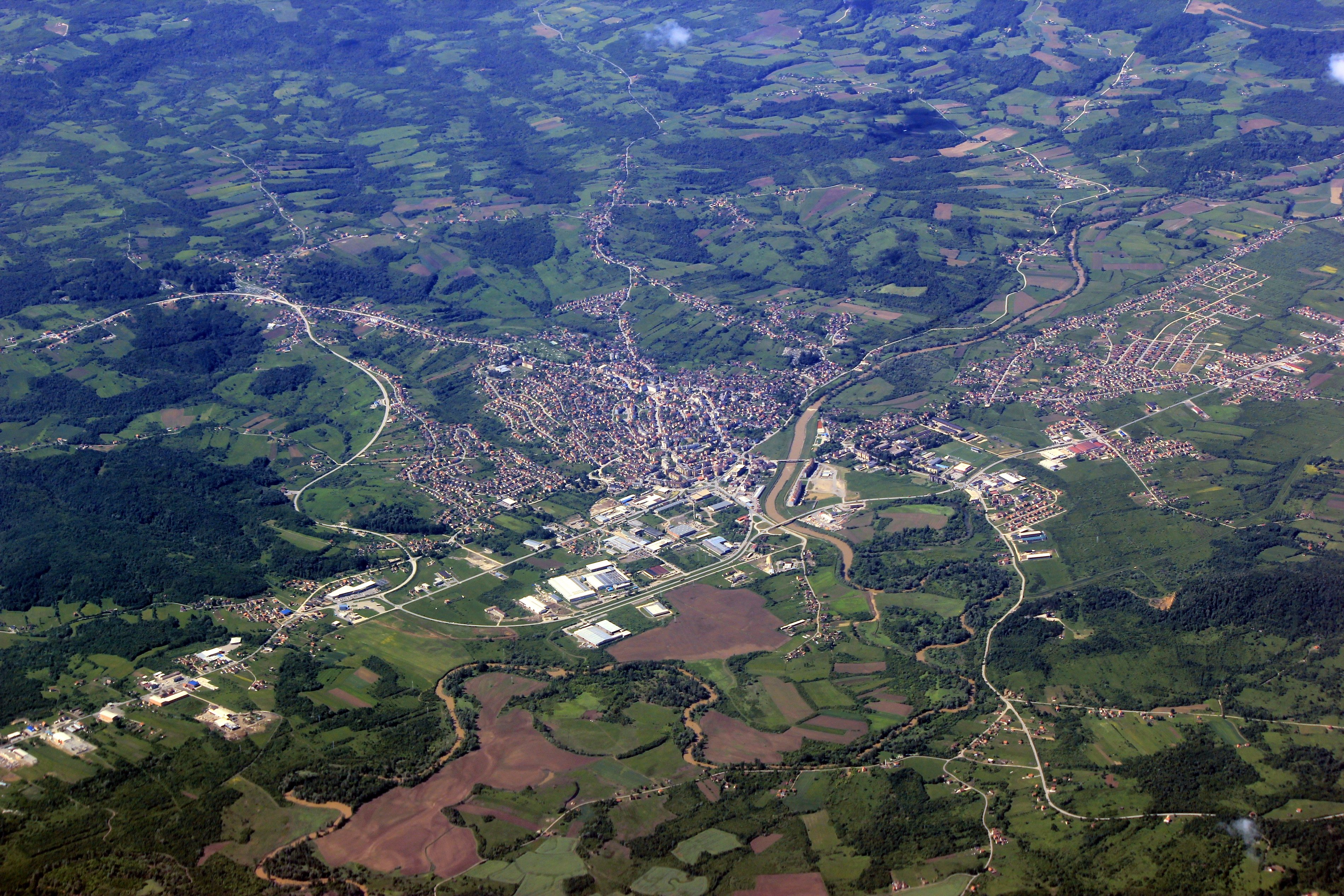
Aerial view of Derventa

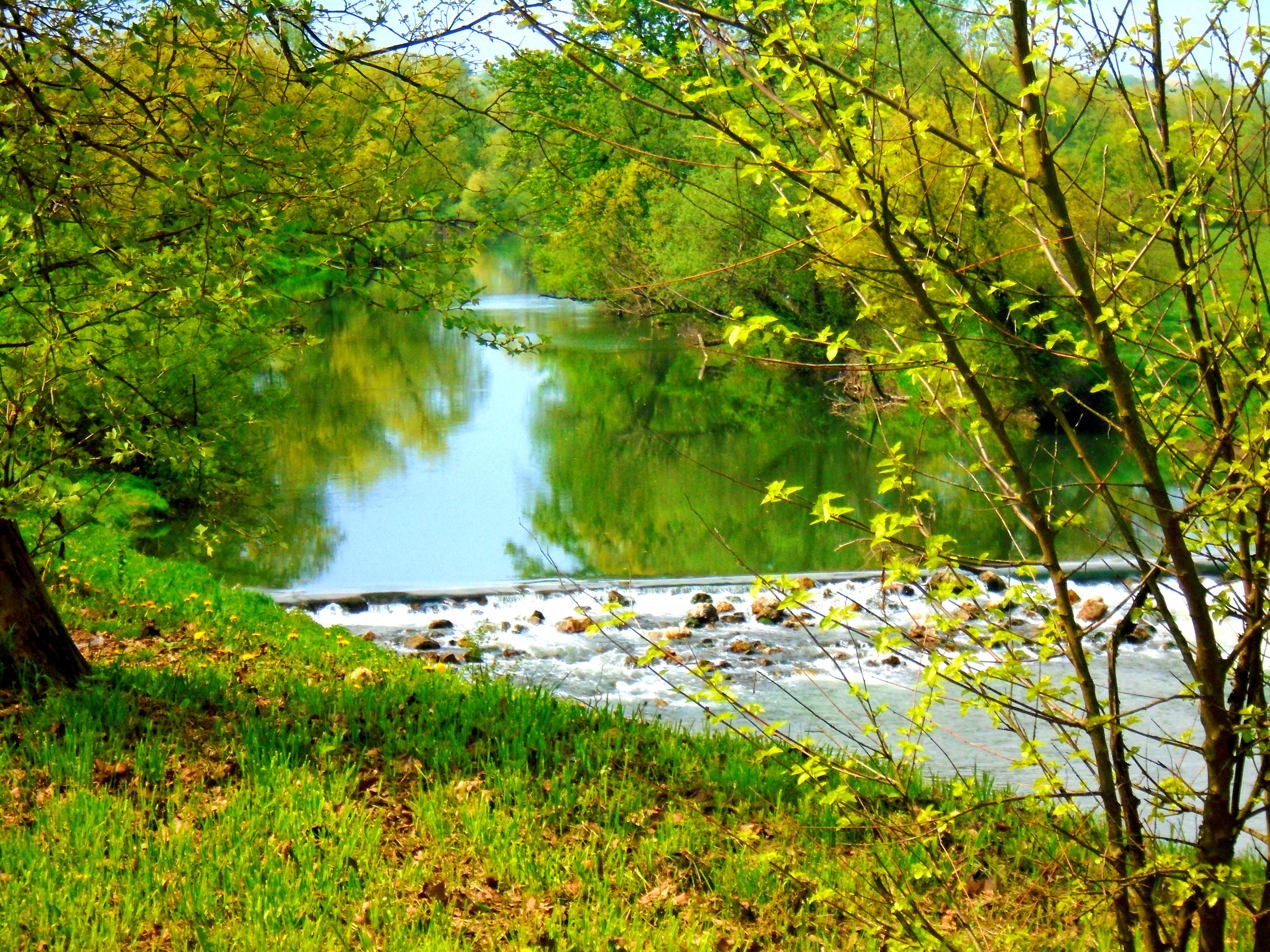
The Ukrina River

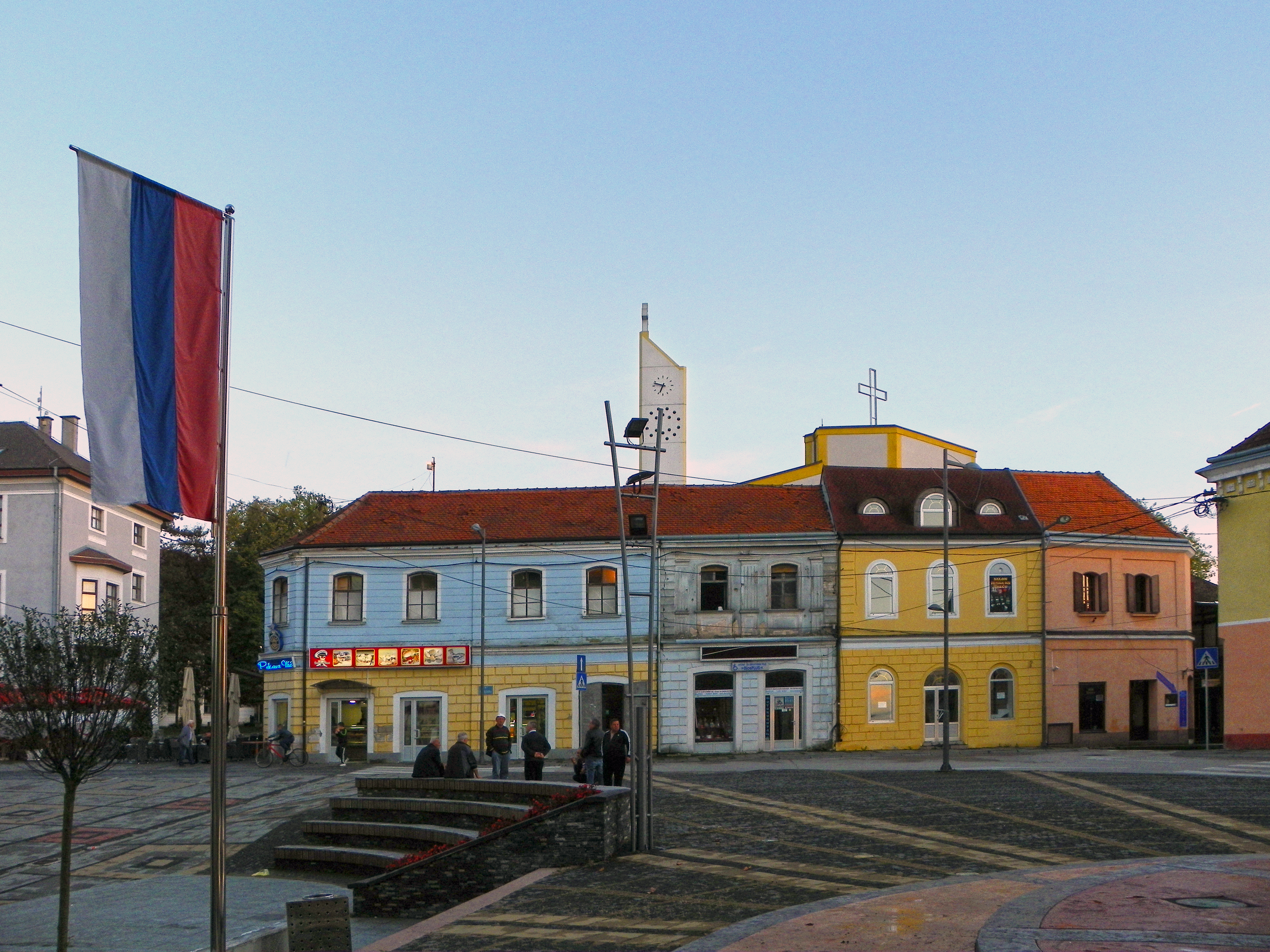
The Town Center

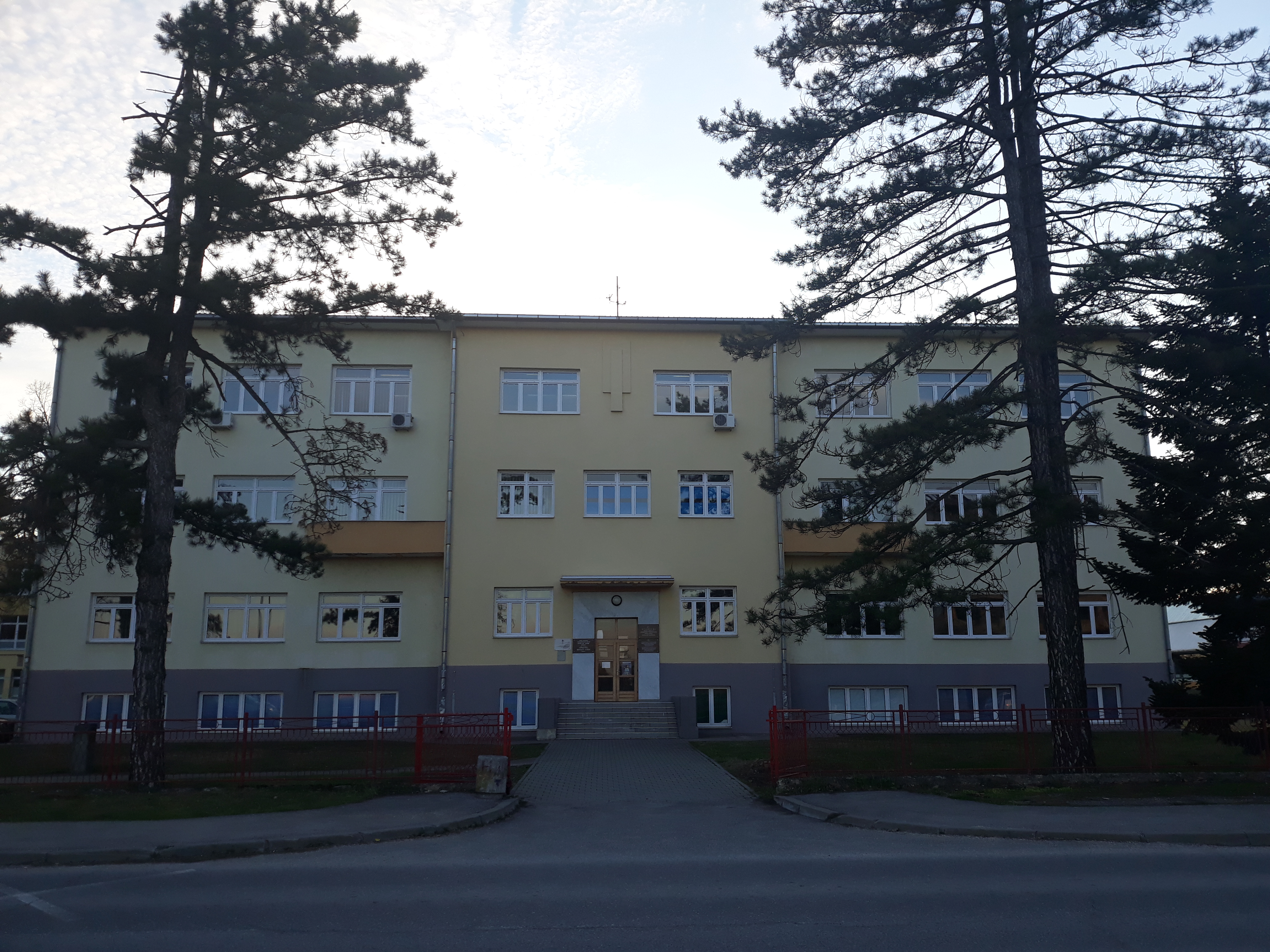
The Mihajlo Pupin Gymnasium

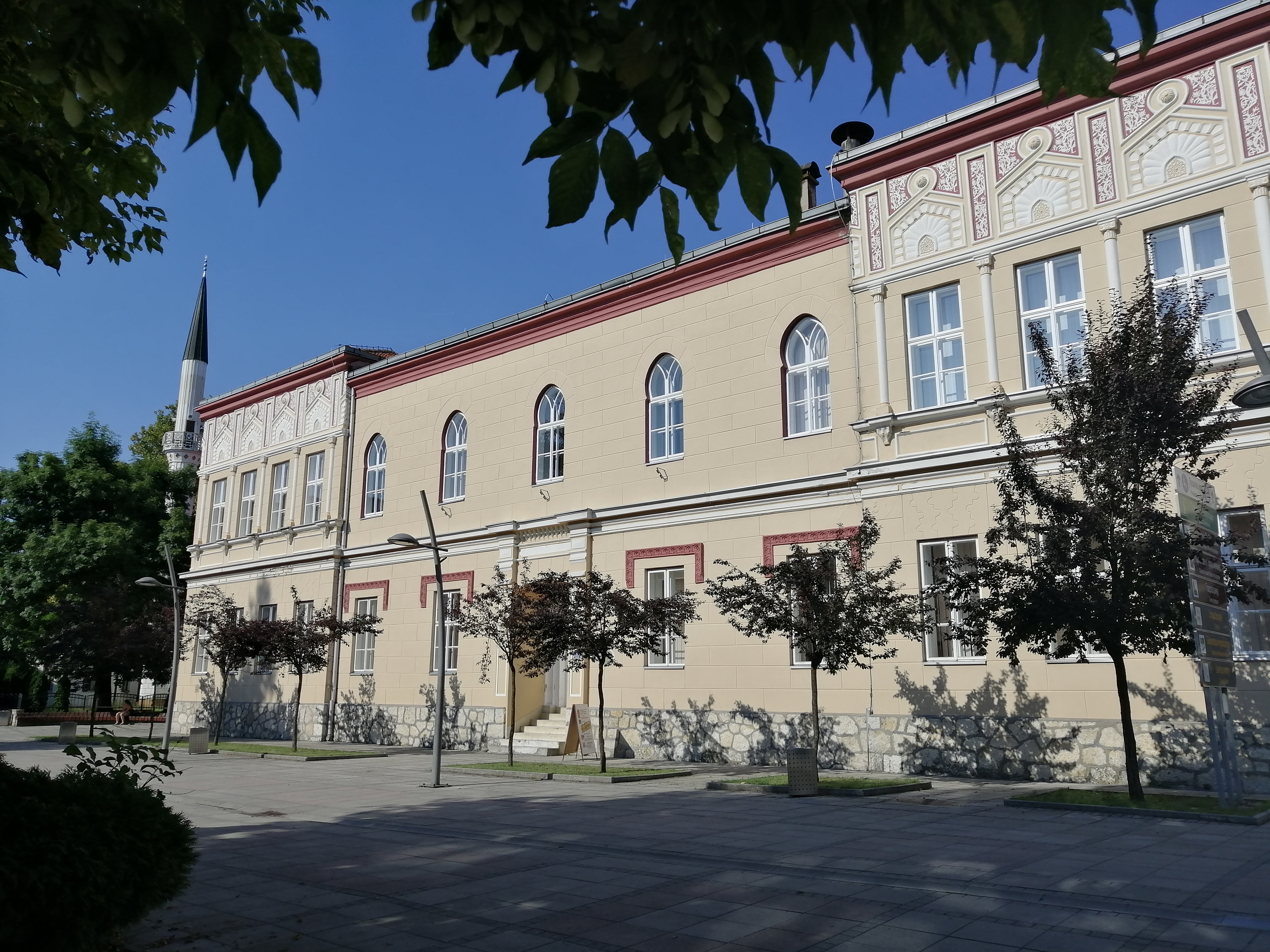
The Branko Radičević National Library

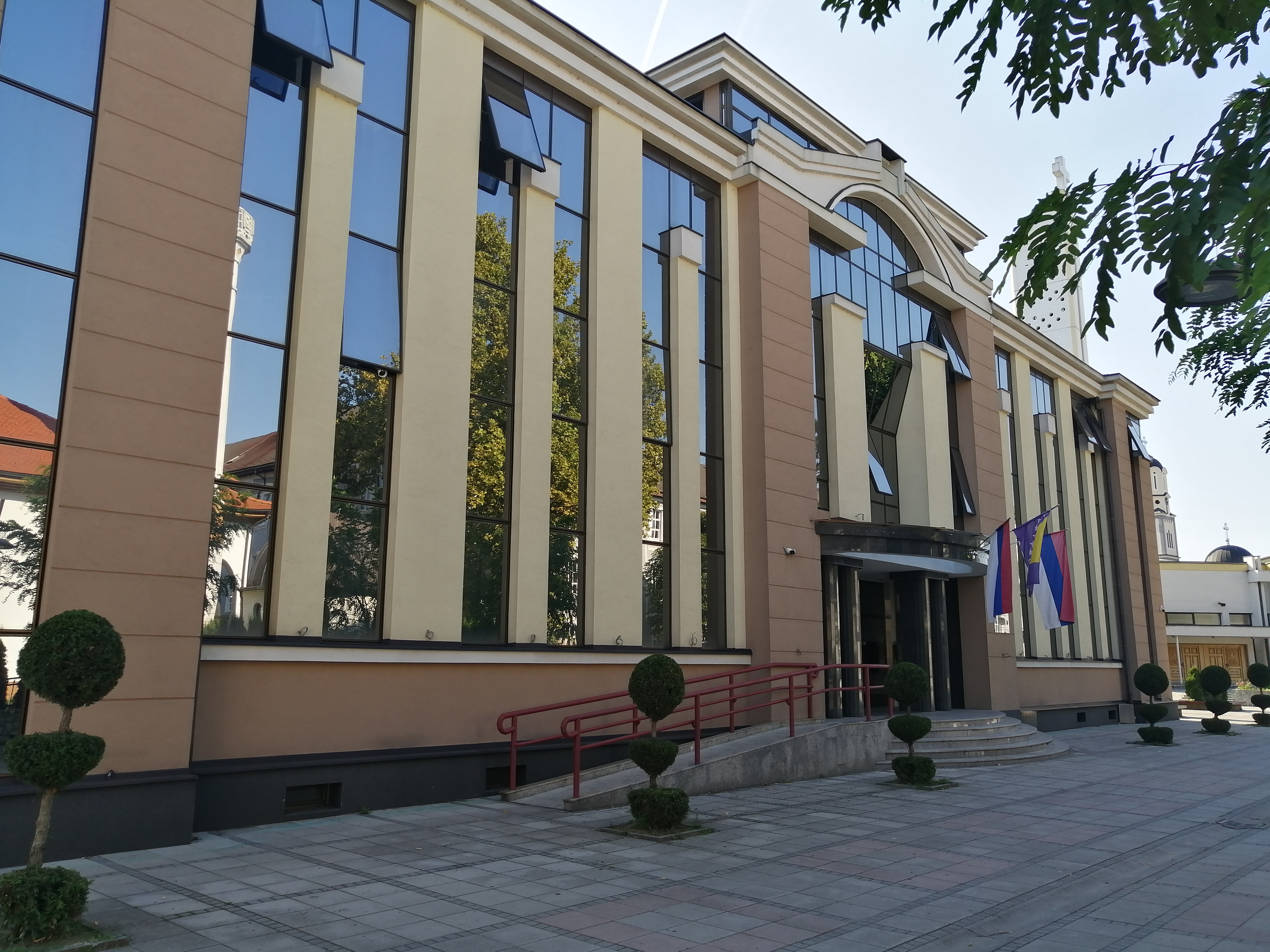
The City Assembly Building

The House of Culture

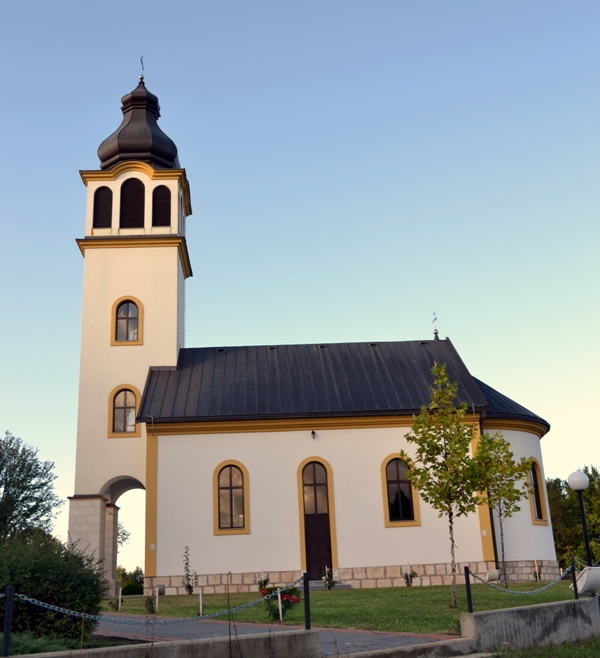
The Detlak Monastery, founded in 1303

Aside from the town of Derventa, the municipality and consists of 56 following settlements:

- Agići
- Begluci
- Bijelo Brdo
- Bosanski Dubočac
- Brezici
- Bukovac
- Bukovica Mala
- Bukovica Velika
- Bunar
- Cerani
- Crnča
- Dažnica
- Donja Bišnja
- Donja Lupljanica
- Donji Detlak
- Donji Višnjik
- Drijen
- Gornja Bišnja
- Gornja Lupljanica
- Gornji Božinci
- Gornji Detlak
- Gornji Višnjik
- Gradac
- Gradina
- Kalenderovci Donji
- Kalenderovci Gornji
- Kostreš
- Kovačevci
- Kulina
- Kuljenovci
- Derventski Lug
- Lužani
- Lužani Bosanski
- Lužani Novi
- Mala Sočanica
- Mišinci
- Miškovci
- Modran
- Osinja
- Osojci
- Pjevalovac
- Pojezna
- Poljari
- Polje
- Rapćani
- Stanići
- Šušnjari
- Tetima
- Trstenci
- Tunjestala
- Velika
- Velika Sočanica
- Vrhovi
- Zelenike
- Žeravac
- Živinice

== Demography ==
=== Population ===
Population of settlements – Derventa Municipality
| | Settlement | 1948. | 1953. | 1961. | 1971. | 1981. | 1991. | 2013. |
| | Total | 43,787 | 53,592 | | 56,141 | 57,010 | 56,489 | 27,404 |
| 1 | Cerani | | | | | | 1,905 | 1,028 |
| 2 | Crnča | | | | | | 1,019 | 684 |
| 3 | Derventa | 9,098 | 9,133 | 9,843 | 11,824 | 14,357 | 17,748 | 11,631 |
| 4 | Donja Lupljanica | | | | | | 1,271 | 705 |
| 5 | Donji Detlak | | | | | | 430 | 249 |
| 6 | Drijen | | | | | | 783 | 442 |
| 7 | Gornja Lupljanica | | | | | | 946 | 329 |
| 8 | Gornji Detlak | | | | | | 1,031 | 577 |
| 9 | Kalenderovci Gornji | | | | | | 512 | 364 |
| 10 | Kostreš | | | | | | 403 | 279 |
| 11 | Kulina | | | | | | 808 | 417 |
| 12 | Lug | | | | | | 1,254 | 1,107 |
| 13 | Lužani | | | | | | 356 | 223 |
| 14 | Lužani Bosanski | | | | | | 786 | 422 |
| 15 | Mala Sočanica | | | | | | 759 | 221 |
| 16 | Miškovci | | | | | | 782 | 528 |
| 17 | Osinja | | | | | | 1,890 | 1,244 |
| 18 | Pojezna | | | | | | 1,277 | 756 |
| 19 | Polje | | | | | | 1,124 | 369 |
| 20 | Tetima | | | | | | 1,164 | 254 |
| 21 | Trstenci | | | | | | 894 | 548 |
| 22 | Velika Sočanica | | | | | | 1,489 | 960 |
| 23 | Živinice | | | | | | 1,290 | 269 |

=== Ethnic composition ===
Ethnic composition – Derventa
| | 2013. | 1991. | 1981. | 1971. |
| Total | 11,631 (100,0%) | 17,748 (100,0%) | 14,357 (100,0%) | 11,824 (100,0%) |
| Serbs | 9,667 (83,11%) | 4,555 (25,66%) | 2,934 (20,44%) | 2,496 (21,11%) |
| Bosniaks | 1,306 (11,23%) | 5,558 (31,32%) | 4,593 (31,99%) | 5,065 (42,84%) |
| Croats | 378 (3,250%) | 4,317 (24,32%) | 3,727 (25,96%) | 3,439 (29,08%) |
| Unaffiliated | 153 (1,315%) | | | |
| Others | 38 (0,327%) | 695 (3,916%) | 242 (1,686%) | 267 (2,258%) |
| Yugoslavs | 37 (0,318%) | 2,623 (14,78%) | 2,799 (19,50%) | 459 (3,882%) |
| Ukrainians | 21 (0,181%) | | | |
| Unknown | 21 (0,181%) | | | |
| Roma | 4 (0,034%) | | | |
| Turks | 4 (0,034%) | | | |
| Montenegrins | 1 (0,009%) | | 21 (0,146%) | 38 (0,321%) |
| Albanians | 1 (0,009%) | | 18 (0,125%) | 11 (0,093%) |
| Macedonians | | | 12 (0,084%) | 14 (0,118%) |
| Slovenes | | | 9 (0,063%) | 32 (0,271%) |
| Hungarians | | | 2 (0,014%) | 3 (0,025%) |

Ethnic composition – Derventa Municipality
| | 2013. | 1991. | 1981. | 1971. |
| Total | 27,404 (100,0%) | 56,489 (100,0%) | 57,010 (100,0%) | 56,141 (100,0%) |
| Serbs | 22,351 (81,56%) | 22,938 (40,61%) | 22,840 (40,06%) | 23,124 (41,19%) |
| Croats | 2,573 (9,389%) | 21,952 (38,86%) | 23,629 (41,45%) | 25,228 (44,94%) |
| Bosniaks | 2,002 (7,306%) | 7,086 (12,54%) | 6,034 (10,58%) | 6,548 (11,66%) |
| Unaffiliated | 252 (0,920%) | | | |
| Others | 65 (0,237%) | 1,165 (2,062%) | 500 (0,877%) | 550 (0,980%) |
| Unknown | 58 (0,212%) | | | |
| Yugoslavs | 53 (0,193%) | 3,348 (5,927%) | 3,914 (6,865%) | 575 (1,024%) |
| Ukrainians | 31 (0,113%) | | | |
| Roma | 10 (0,036%) | | | |
| Turks | 4 (0,015%) | | | |
| Montenegrins | 3 (0,011%) | | 35 (0,061%) | 48 (0,085%) |
| Slovenes | 1 (0,004%) | | 16 (0,028%) | 36 (0,064%) |
| Albanians | 1 (0,004%) | | 20 (0,035%) | 12 (0,021%) |
| Macedonians | | | 16 (0,028%) | 17 (0,030%) |
| Hungarians | | | 6 (0,011%) | 3 (0,005%) |

== Economy ==
The following table gives a preview of the total number of registered people employed in professional fields per their core activity (as of 2018):

| Professional field | Total |
|---|---|
| Agriculture, forestry and fishing | 132 |
| Mining and quarrying | 5 |
| Manufacturing | 3,398 |
| Electricity, gas, steam and air conditioning supply | 45 |
| Water supply; sewerage, waste management and remediation activities | 104 |
| Construction | 227 |
| Wholesale and retail trade, repair of motor vehicles and motorcycles | 1,237 |
| Transportation and storage | 212 |
| Accommodation and food services | 227 |
| Information and communication | 45 |
| Financial and insurance activities | 66 |
| Real estate activities | 5 |
| Professional, scientific and technical activities | 125 |
| Administrative and support service activities | 48 |
| Public administration and defense; compulsory social security | 244 |
| Education | 489 |
| Human health and social work activities | 187 |
| Arts, entertainment and recreation | 33 |
| Other service activities | 83 |
| Total | 6,912 |

== Sports ==
The most popular sport in Derventa is football and the town has a long footballing tradition. Derventa's first football club was formed in 1919 under the name FK Dečko. Several other sports associations formed in Derventa prior to the outbreak of the Second World War. The war caused the dissolution of all previous clubs in Derventa and the formation of FK Tekstilac, who merged with FK Dečko. FK Tekstilac still competes to this day in the First League of the Republika Srpska and its home ground is Gradski Stadion FK Tekstilac, which has an attendance capacity of around 500 spectators. Derventa's most successful sports team is RK Derventa, which currently competes in the Premier league of Bosnia and Herzegovina for handball, which is the nation's top professional handball division. Derventa is known throughout the region for its tradition of handball excellence, creating many great players as well as having a very successful club given the size of the town.

== Notable people ==
- Vedran Ćorluka (born 1986), footballer
- Mile Kitić (born 1952), folk singer
- Miroslav Pejić (born 1986), footballer
- Mario Tokić (born 1975), footballer
- Radenka Maric, President of the University of Connecticut
- Ivan Martić (born 1990), footballer
- Abaz Arslanagić (born 1944), handball player and coach
- Muhamed Memić (born 1960), handball player
- Sulejman Medenčević (born 1963), cinematographer
- Senad Lupić (born 1966), footballer
- Zoran Rankić (1935–2019), actor
- Alojz Benac (1914–1992), archaeologist

== Twin Town – Sister City ==
Derventa is twinned with:

- Pinerolo, Italy (2005)
- Dunavarsány, Hungary (2016)
