= Maciej Boryna =

Polish journalist and scientific researcher

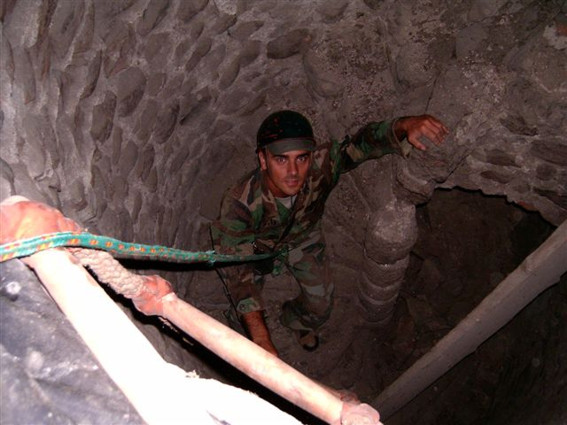
- Maciej Boryna – 2005
- Born: 28 March 1974 (age 52); Szprotawa, Poland
- Occupations: Journalist, writer, researcher
- Awards: by Polish Ministry of Culture and National Heritage, Medal of Honored for Commune Szprotawa
- Website: https://borynam.wixsite.com/maciej-boryna

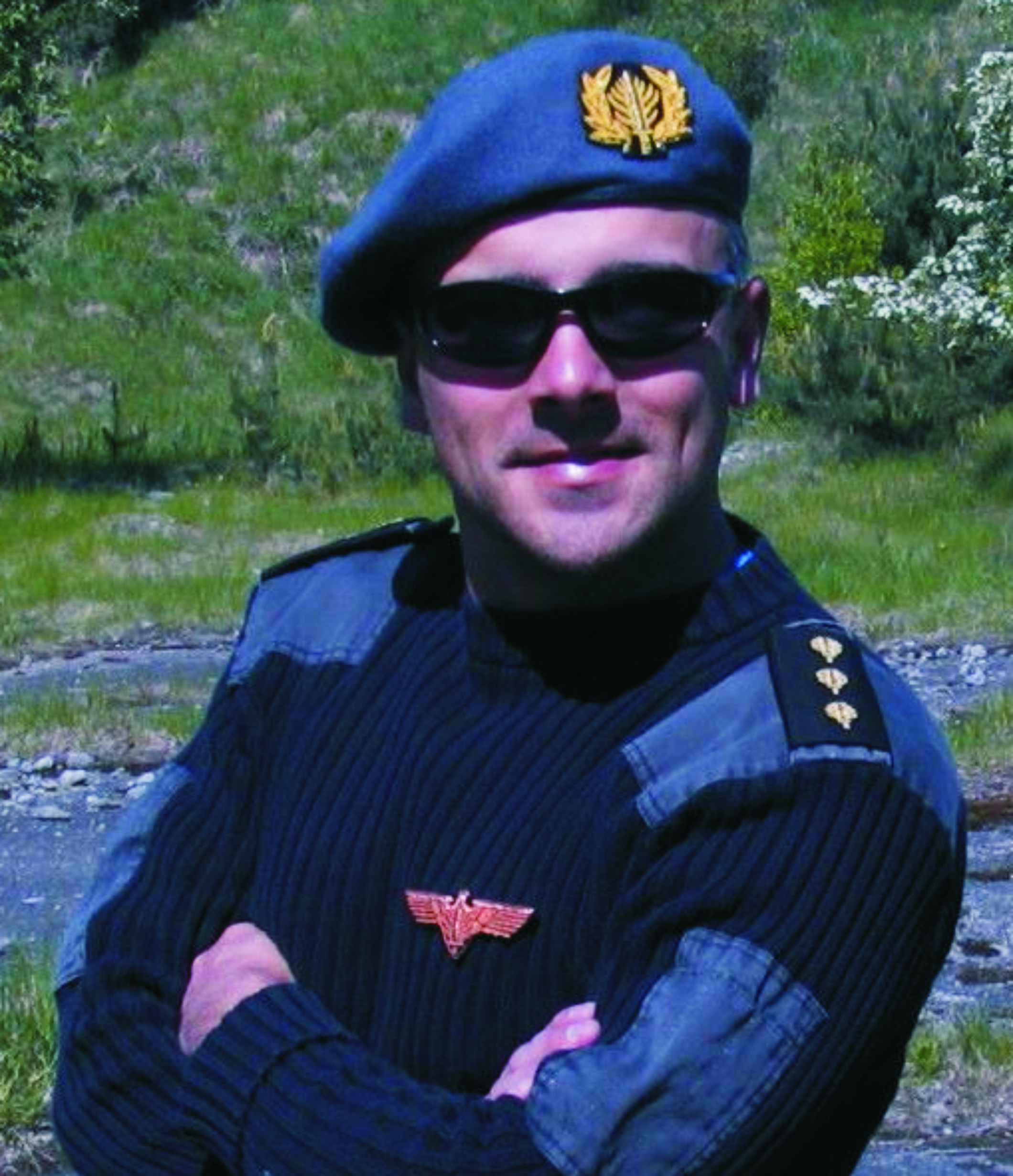
Maciej Boryna, member of the Sword of Freedom

Maciej Boryna (born 28 March 1974 in Szprotawa/Sprottau) is a Polish journalist and scientific researcher, author of many books of Silesian history, founder and director of Regional History Museum F.Matuszkiewicz's in Szprotawa, co-founder and first president of Lower Silesian Forest Institute, state keeper of monuments and nature, alderman in Szprotawa (2006–2010), member in Żagański-District board of directors (since 2010), member of the Sword of Freedom.

Director of researching program "Silesian Walls" and "Chrobry fortified village in Szprotawa", designer of forest preserve "Slavic Park". Awarded by Polish Ministry of Culture and National Heritage (2008), medal of Honored for Commune Szprotawa (2002).

2017-2018 he has successfully fought about close of the minacious landfill site in Kartowice (Poland), 2018 falsely accused of character assassination regarding the company Suez Zachód, won a lawsuit 2019.

== His books and publications ==
- Szprotawskie karty. Szprotawa jakiej już nie ma., 1996
- Sensacje Ziemi Szprotawskiej, 2000 (ISBN 83-913508-0-0)
- Tajemnice Szprotawy i okolic, 2001 (ISBN 83-913508-1-9)
- Program rozwoju turystyki w Gminie Wymiarki, 2002 wspólnie z J.Ryszawy
- Gmina Wymiarki. Rys historyczny., 2003
- Szprotawa i okolice (red.), 2003–2004 (4 numery)
- Flins na Dolnym Śląsku, Łużycach i w Saksonii, 2004
- Klaus Haensch. Pomiędzy Szprotawą a Europą, 2005
- Gminna Ewidencja Zabytków – Gm. Szprotawa, 2005
- Tajemnice militarne Szprotawy na Dolnym Śląsku, 2006
- Stan turystyki w Gm. Szprotawa. Program rozwoju turystyki w Gm. Szprotawa, 2007
- Dokumentacja projektowa Zespołu Przyrodniczo-Krajobrazowego "Park Słowiański" w Szprotawie, 2007
- Gminna Ewidencja Zabytków – Gm. Wymiarki, 2007
- Stan turystyki w Gm. Małomice. Program rozwoju turystyki w Gm. Małomice, 2007
- Małomice na rubieży Borów Dolnośląskich, 2008 OCLC 297532037 (ISBN 978-83-61315-04-9)
- Powiat Żagański. Książęca Kraina., 2009 współautor
- Szprotawa i okolice. Na tropach historii i przyrody, 2010 wspólnie z prof. Hieronimem Szczegółą (ISBN 978-83-930486-4-9)
- Encyklopedia Ziemi Szprotawskiej i Żagańskiej (red.), 2010 (ISBN 978-83-930137-0-8)
- Wały Śląskie. Tajemnice dawnych granic, 2011 (ISBN 978-83-930137-1-5)
- Dawne życie mieszkańców Borów Dolnośląskich na przykładzie Lubiechowa w byłym powiecie szprotawskim, 2013 (ISBN 978-83-930137-4-6)
- Historia i architektura Bramy Żagańskiej w Szprotawie, 2013 with A.Cichalewska (ISBN 978-83-930137-3-9)
- Felix Matuszkiewicz ze Szprotawy. Serce w Szprotawie zostawione, 2014 with K.Danielkowska (ISBN 978-83-930137-2-2)
- Szkice z dziejów Jelenina w gminie Żagań, 2014 with H.Janowicz (ISBN 978-83-930137-5-3)
- Dawne dzieje Leszna Górnego w Borach Dolnośląskich, 2014 with K.Danielkowska (ISBN 978-83-930137-7-7)
- Wiechlice na rubieży Borów Dolnośląskich, 2015 with D.Grzeszczak (ISBN 978-83-930137-6-0)
- Z Kresów na Kresy, 2015 (ISBN 978-83-930137-8-4)
- Wędrówki po Puszczy Wiechlickiej, 2015 with H.Janowicz (ISBN 978-83-930137-9-1)
- Przykłady budownictwa obronnego ziemi szprotawskiej, Żary 2015, praca dyplomowa pod kierunkiem dr G.Popowa
- Co kryją Stawy Bobrowickie w Borach Dolnośląskich, 2017 with M.Krzak (ISBN 978-83-946534-0-8)
- Gościeszowice i Międzylesie w gminie Niegosławice – Historie nieznane, 2018 with H.Janowicz (ISBN 978-83-946534-1-5)
- Drogi i trasy rowerowe w Gminie Szprotawa. Analiza stanu, potrzeb i możliwości, Szprotawa 2019
- Założenia do koncepcji zagospodarowania Parku Goepperta w Szprotawie, 2020 with J.Ryszawy (ISBN 978-83-930486-7-0)
- Zespół Przyrodniczo-Krajobrazowy Potok Sucha w gminie Szprotawa. Przewodnik turystyczny., Szprotawa 2022 (ISBN 978-83-930486-2-5)

== Journeys and scientific research ==
- Archaeological sites in the Jesus Church in Szprotawa (2000)
- Expedition to the source of Czerna River (2002)
- Expedition to the source of Bóbr (2003)
- Expedition to the source of Kwisa (2004)
- Exploration in the tower of St. Maria Church in Szprotawa (2005)
- Research Program "Castle in Sprottau" (2006)
- Exploration in the Tomb of the Order of Mary the Magdala in Szprotawa (2009)
- Archaeological sites in the Silesia Wall, under the patronage of Polish Academy of Sciences (2008)
- Archaeological sites in the Chrobry fortified village, under the patronage of Polish Academy of Sciences (2008–2009)
- Discovery of German Bunkers from Third Reich in Lower Silesian Wilderness (2009)
- Discovery of many new fragments of the Silesian Walls (2008–2010)
- Discovery of penitential cross from Lubiechów (2010)
- Discovery of penitential cross from Długie (2010)
- Research Program "Dunes and periodic waters in Lower Silesian Wilderness" (cince 2011)
