= Studzianka railway station =

Railway station in Studzianka, south-western Poland

Studzianka
- Station seen from a distance in September 2023

General information
- Location: Studzianka, Lower Silesian Voivodeship; Poland
- Coordinates: 51°25′37.4″N 15°41′42.5″E
- Owner: PKP Polskie Linie Kolejowe
- Line: Wrocław Muchobór–Gubinek
- Platforms: 1
- Tracks: 1

History
- Opened: 1920
- Former names: Armadebrunn (1920–1945); Zdrojowice (1945–1947)

Services
Preceding station	KD	Following station
Wierzbowa Śląska towards Wrocław Główny	D14	Leszno Górne towards Forst (Lausitz)
Location
- Location within Poland Location within Lower Silesian Voivodeship

Studzianka is a railway station near the former village of Studzianka, Bolesławiec County within the Lower Silesian Voivodeship in south-western Poland. It is entirely surrounded by the Lower Silesian Forest, located between the villages of Leszno Górne and Wierzbowa.

== History ==
The station opened as Armadebrunn in 1920. The station building was a replica of the one at Wierzbowa Śląska.

After World War II, the area came under Polish administration. As a result, the station taken over by Polish State Railways. It was renamed to Zdrojowice, and later to its modern name, Studzianka, in 1947, when it also reopened to services after it was briefly closed from 1945. Studzianka was briefly closed again between 1987 and 1993. It was downgraded to a railway halt in December 1998. At the same time, the sidings officially came out of service, which were dismantled in 2014.

The station building and other former railway buildings (except the signalbox) were demolished in summer 2004. The signalbox was demolished in 2010.

== Station ==
Studzianka is a railway halt consisting of one low-level side platform. It once had a station building, signalbox, and several sidings with a goods yard used for loading timber. The station is most often used by mushroom pickers, as the village of Studzianka has been uninhabited since 1945.

== Train services ==
Train services are operated by Lower Silesian Railways (KD). It is a request stop of KD.

The station is served by the following services:

- Regional services (KD) Wrocław - Legnica - Żary - Forst (Lausitz)

== See also ==
- Okrąglica railway station, similar railway station also located in the Lower Silesian Forest
