= Dziećmiarowice =

- Village
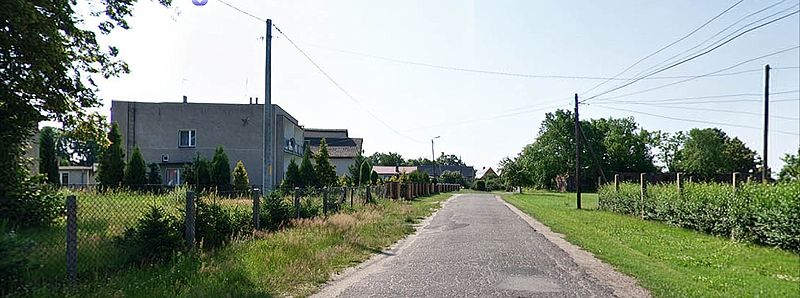

- Location within Poland
- Coordinates: 51°32′N 15°35′E
- Country: Poland
- Voivodeship: Lubusz
- County: Żagań
- Gmina: Szprotawa

Dziećmiarowice [d͡ʑɛt͡ɕmjarɔˈvit͡sɛ] is a village in the administrative district of Gmina Szprotawa, within Żagań County, Lubusz Voivodeship, in western Poland. It approximately 7 km (4 mi) south-east of Szprotawa, 21 km (13 mi) south-east of Żagań, and 46 km (29 mi) south of Zielona Góra.
