= Biernatów =

Biernatów refers to the following places in Poland:

- Biernatów, Lubusz Voivodeship
- Biernatów, Opole Voivodeship
