= Lower Silesian Forest =

Largest forest of Poland

Lower Silesian Forest: Bory Dolnośląskie (Polish); Niederschlesische Heide (German); Niederschläsche Heede (Lower Silesian)
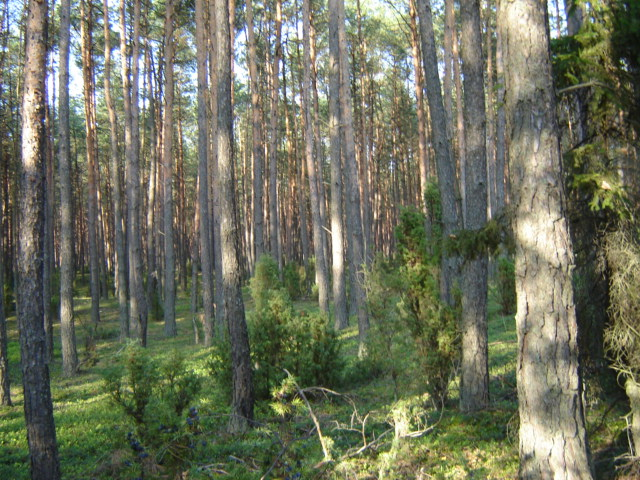
- Lower Silesian Forest is predominantly made of pine trees

- Location within Poland

Geography
- Location: Lower Silesian Voivodeship, Lubusz Voivodeship, Poland
- Coordinates: 51.3705°N 15.1204°E

Lower Silesian Forest (Polish: Bory Dolnośląskie, German: Niederschlesische Heide, Lower Silesian: Niederschläsche Heede) is the largest continuous forest of Poland, with total area of 1650 square kilometres. It is located in southwestern Poland, in the Lower Silesian Voivodeship and the Lubusz Voivodeship, near border with Germany. Western boundary of the forest is made by the Nysa Łużycka, behind which spreads a German forest, Muskau Heath. It is mostly covered by pine trees.

The area of the Lower Silesian Forest is predominantly flat, with the biggest point, the hill called Dębniak measuring only 238 meters above sea level. The wilderness is subdivided into several smaller forests, and it is crossed by a number of rivers, including the Kwisa, the Bóbr, and the Szprotawa. Among most important urban centres in this region are Bolesławiec, Węgliniec, Żagań, Żary, Szprotawa, and Pieńsk.

The Lower Silesian Forest is very popular among hunters, as it is rich in such animals as deer, wild pigs, hares, foxes, and wolves.

Honey production is cultivated in the forest since the Middle Ages, and the Lower Silesian Forest Heather Honey (Miód wrzosowy z Borów Dolnośląskich) is designated a traditional food by the Ministry of Agriculture and Rural Development of Poland.

== Forests ==
The following forest complexes are part of the Lower Silesian Forest:

- Bolesławiec Forest
- Chocianowiec Forest
- Kliczków Forest
- Osiecznica Forest
- Przemków Forest
- Szprotawa Forest
- Wiechlice Forest
- Zgorzelec Forest (German: Görlitzer Heide)
- Żagań Forest

== Gallery ==
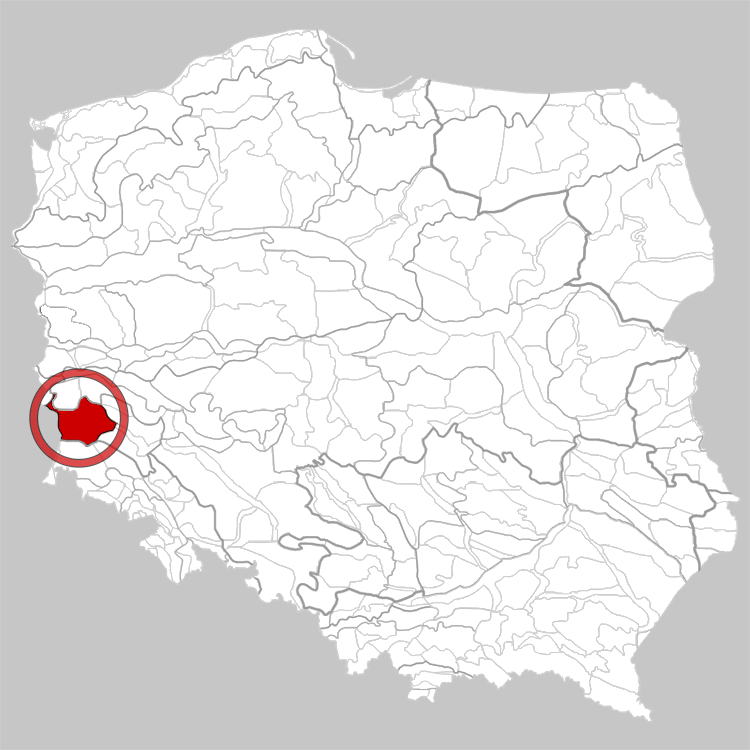
Location within Poland

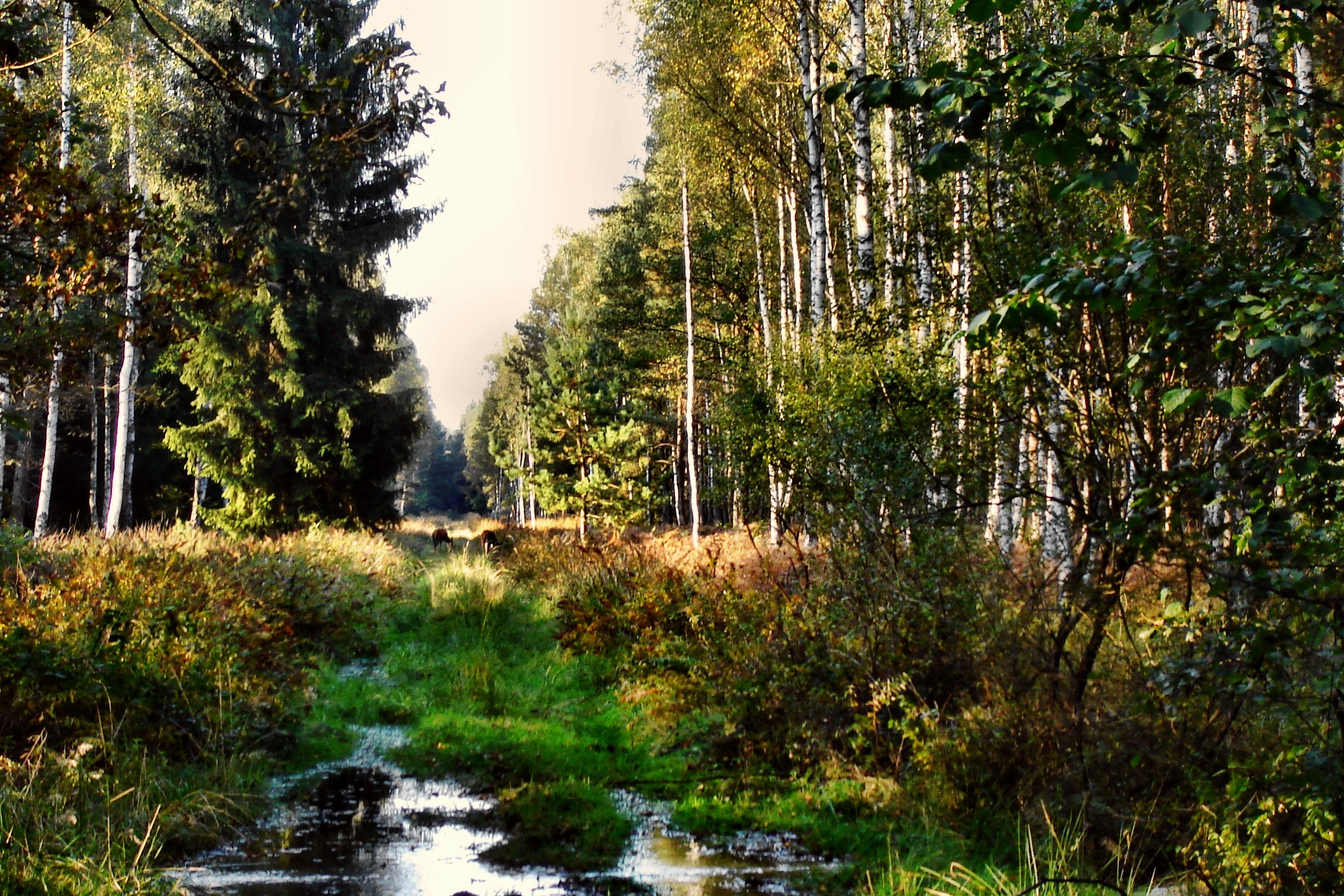
Forest near Ruszów

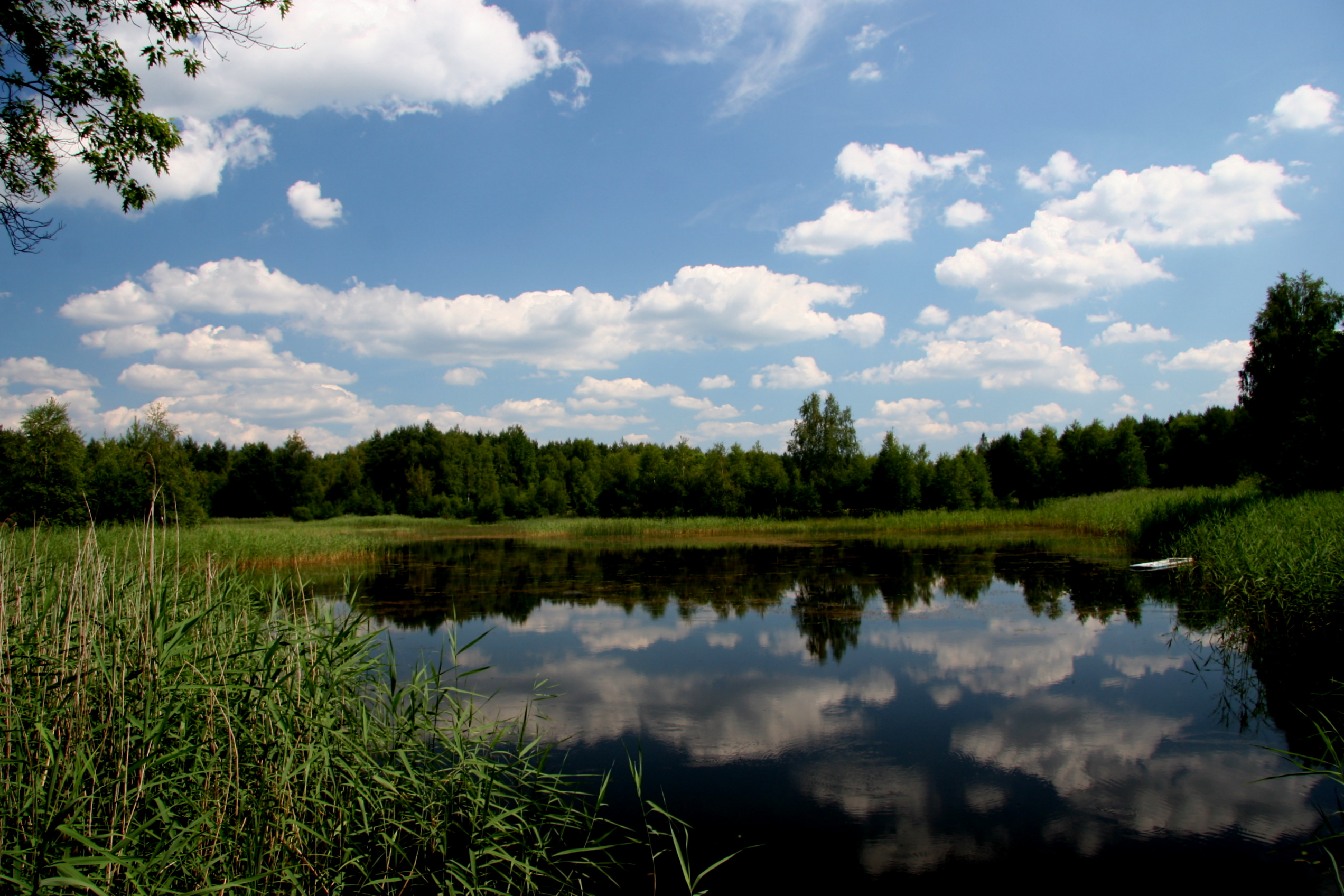
Pond in Żagań

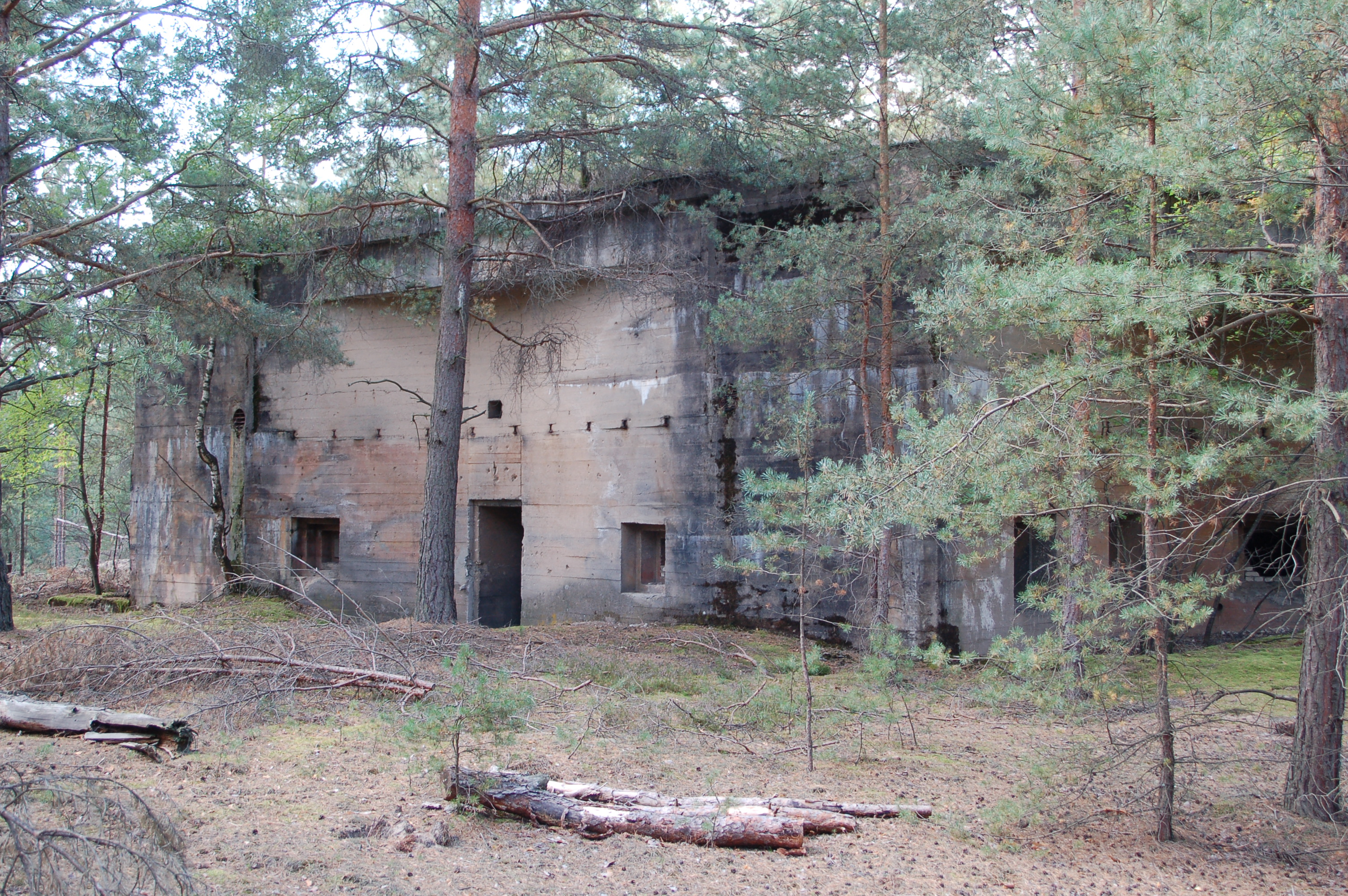
German-built bunker from World War II near Szprotawa

== See also ==
- Silesia Walls
