= Bobrowice =

Bobrowice may refer to:

- Bobrowice, Gmina Bobrowice, Krosno County in Lubusz Voivodeship (west Poland)
- Bobrowice, Żagań County in Lubusz Voivodeship (west Poland)
- Bobrowice, West Pomeranian Voivodeship (north-west Poland)
- Gmina Bobrowice
