= Pasterzowice =

- Village
- Location within Poland
- Coordinates: 51°35′N 15°34′E
- Country: Poland
- Voivodeship: Lubusz
- County: Żagań
- Gmina: Szprotawa
- First mentioned: 1283
- Time zone: UTC+1 (CET)
  - Summer (DST): UTC+2 (CEST)
- Vehicle registration: FZG

Pasterzowice [pastɛʐɔˈvit͡sɛ] is a village in the administrative district of Gmina Szprotawa, within Żagań County, Lubusz Voivodeship, in western Poland.

== History ==
The village was first mentioned in 1283, when it was part of Piast-ruled Poland. In the 18th century it was annexed by Prussia, and from 1871 to 1945 it also formed part of Germany. During World War II, a German forced labour subcamp of the prison in Jawor was operated in the village. After the defeat of Nazi Germany in the war in 1945, the village became again part of Poland.
