= Cieciszów =

- Village
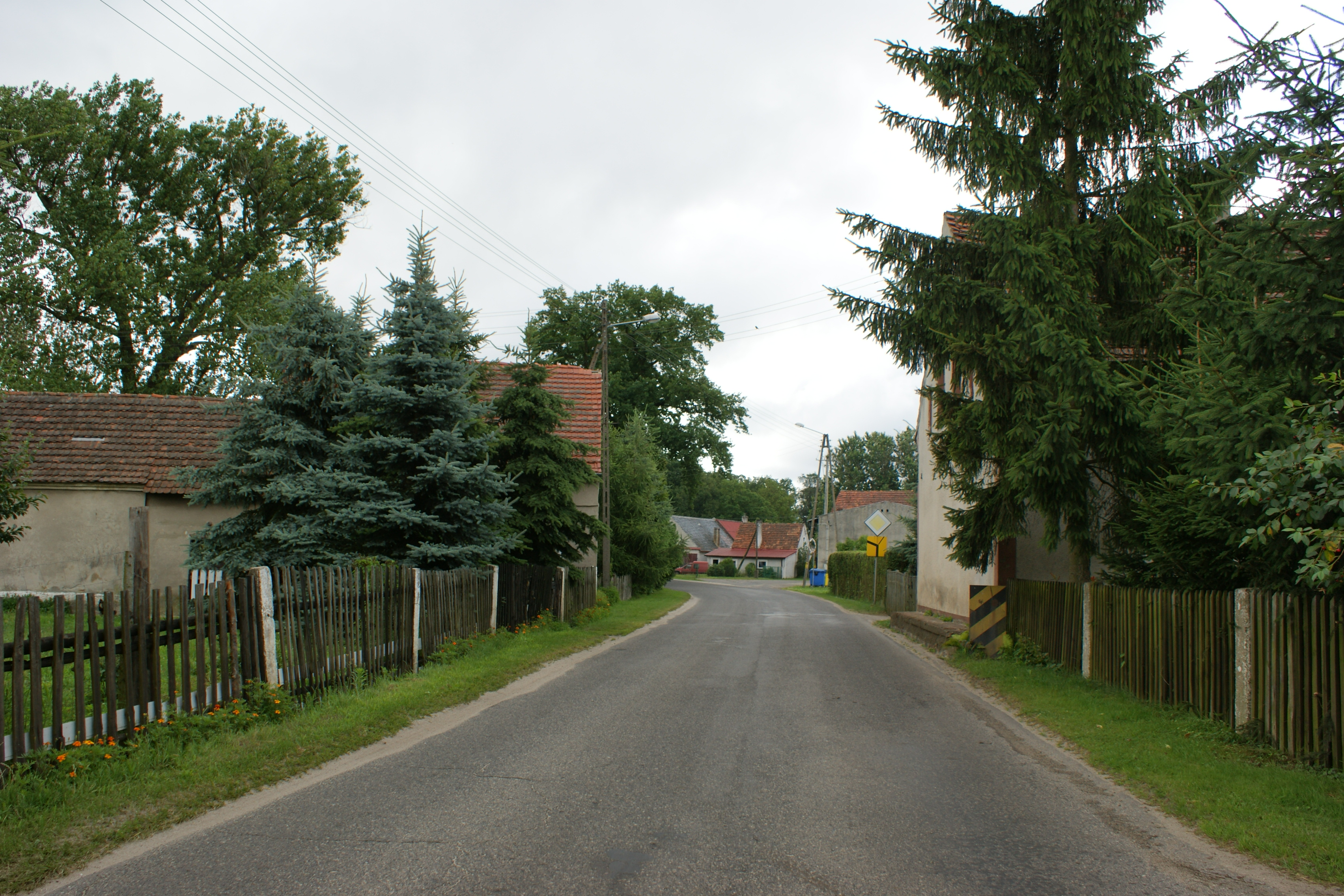

- Location within Poland
- Coordinates: 51°34′5″N 15°37′49″E
- Country: Poland
- Voivodeship: Lubusz
- County: Żagań
- Gmina: Szprotawa

Cieciszów [t͡ɕɛˈt͡ɕiʂuf] is a village in the administrative district of Gmina Szprotawa, within Żagań County, Lubusz Voivodeship, in western Poland.
