= Buczek, Lubusz Voivodeship =

Buczek
- Village
- Location within Poland
- Coordinates: 51°27′35″N 15°35′20″E
- Country: Poland
- Voivodeship: Lubusz
- County: Żagań
- Gmina: Szprotawa
- Population (2021): 8

Buczek [ˈbut͡ʂɛk] is a village in the administrative district of Gmina Szprotawa, within Żagań County, Lubusz Voivodeship, in western Poland.
