= Chrobry Gord =

Village in Poland

Coordinates: 51°33′27″N 15°31′03″E

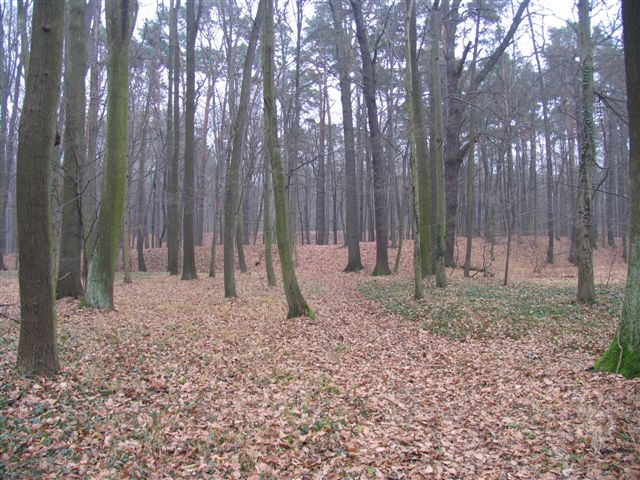
Remnants of the earthworks as seen from the west

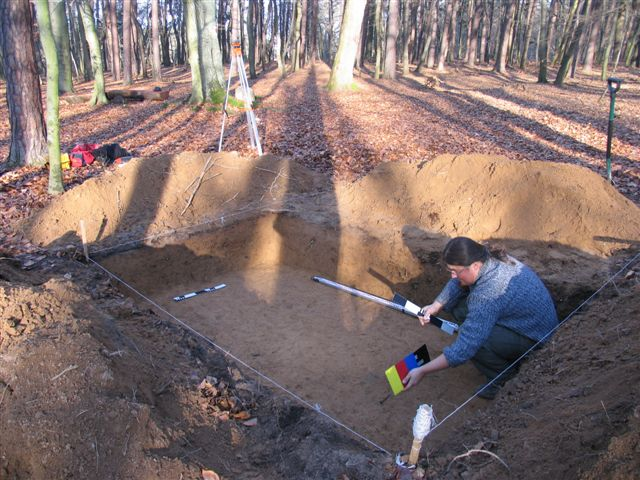
December 2008 excavations by the Polish Academy of Sciences

The Chrobry Gord (Polish: Gród Chrobry, German: Wallburg Chrobry) is an archaeological earthwork and a historical monument near Szprotawa, in the Polish southwestern province of Lower Silesia. It is one of the largest of its kind in Poland and was named after the country's first crowned ruler, Bolesław I the Brave (in Polish known as Chrobry).

== Background ==
The site lies in the old Bóbr river valley, in the Park Słowiański nature reserve, and comprises a polygonal plateau of 4 hectares (9.9 acres) in size, which is raised 6 metres above its surroundings. The surface of the polygon is flat throughout, and has regular, steep inclined edges. The site lies between a bog and a marsh, which are now both partly dried out.

Prior to 1945 the site was known as the 'Nun Bush Hill' (German: Nonnenbuschberg).

The date of the original structure is as yet unknown. German historian August Gloger (1927) described the site as dating from the times these lands were still Polish, but without providing particulars. Recently, Maciej Boryna, from the local historical museum Muzeum Ziemi Szprotawskiej, identified ceramic fragments from the site as Medieval, concluding that the structure was never completed or was only inhabited briefly.

As of 30 May 2007, thanks to the efforts of the local historical society Towarzystwo Bory Dolnośląskie, the site is now protected as a place of designated historical importance. Other, smaller archaeological earthworks can be found nearby.
