= Gmina Szprotawa =

Gmina Szprotawa Szprotawa Commune
- Gmina
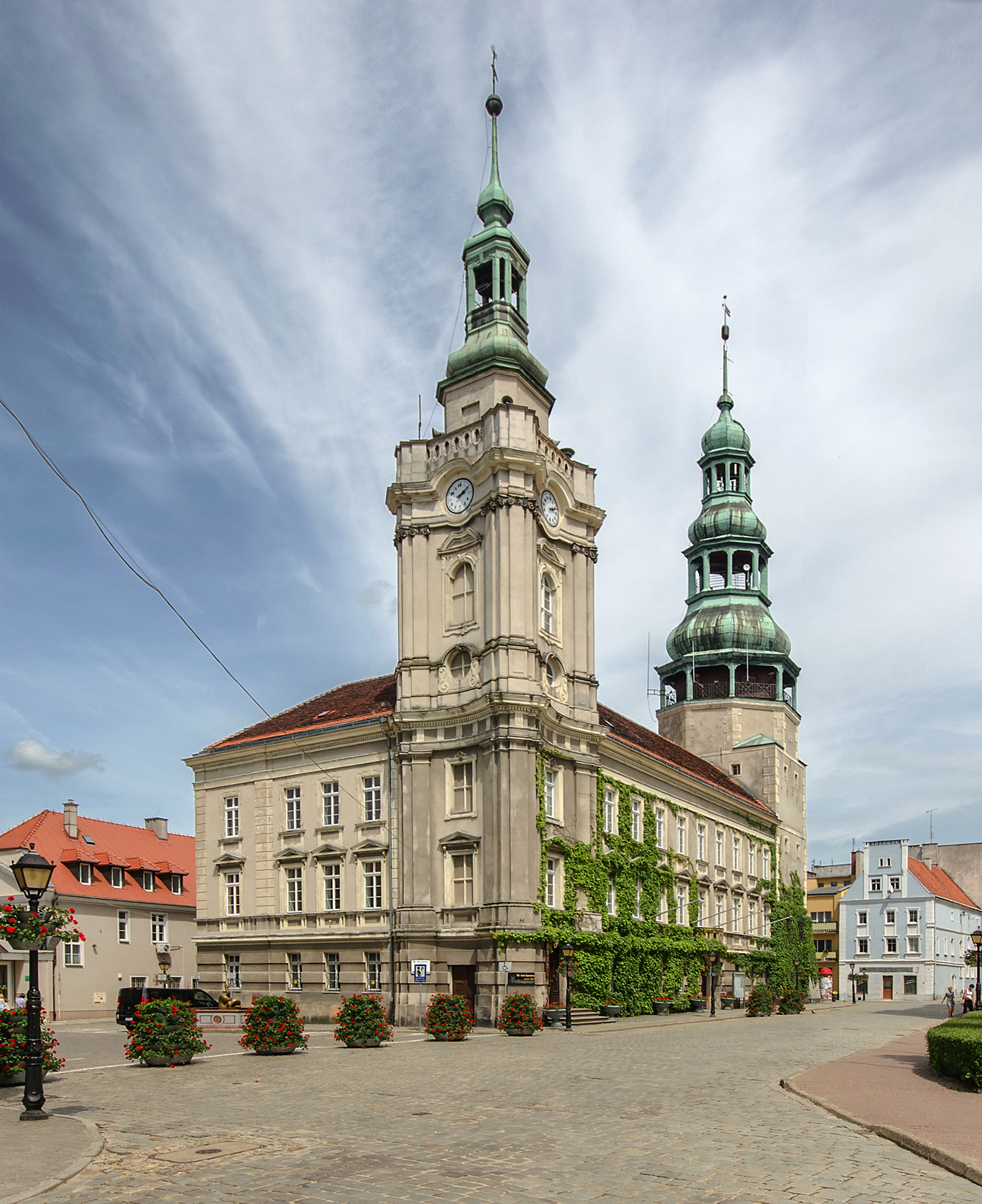
- Town Hall in Szprotawa, seat of the gmina office

- Coat of arms
- Interactive map of Gmina Szprotawa
- Coordinates (Szprotawa): 51°34′N 15°30′E
- Country: Poland
- Voivodeship: Lubusz
- County: Żagań
- Seat: Szprotawa

Area
  - Total: 232.31 km^{2} (89.70 sq mi)

Population (2019-06-30)
  - Total: 20,684
  - Density: 89.036/km^{2} (230.60/sq mi)
  - Urban: 11,820
  - Rural: 8,864
- Time zone: UTC+1 (CET)
  - Summer (DST): UTC+2 (CEST)
- Vehicle registration: FZG
- Website: http://www.szprotawa.pl

Gmina Szprotawa is an urban-rural gmina (administrative district) in Żagań County, Lubusz Voivodeship, in western Poland. Its seat is the town of Szprotawa, which lies approximately 14 kilometres (9 mi) south-east of Żagań and 42 km (26 mi) south of Zielona Góra.

The gmina covers an area of 232.31 square kilometres (89.7 sq mi), and as of 2019 its total population is 20,684.

== Villages ==
Apart from the town of Szprotawa, Gmina Szprotawa contains the villages and settlements of Biernatów, Bobrowice, Borowina, Buczek, Cieciszów, Długie, Dziećmiarowice, Dzikowice, Henryków, Kartowice, Leszno Dolne, Leszno Górne, Nowa Kopernia, Pasterzowice, Siecieborzyce, Sieraków, Wiechlice and Witków.

== Neighbouring gminas ==
Gmina Szprotawa is bordered by the gminas of Bolesławiec, Gromadka, Kożuchów, Małomice, Niegosławice, Nowe Miasteczko, Osiecznica, Przemków and Żagań.

== Twin towns – sister cities ==
Gmina Szprotawa is twinned with:

- Gevelsberg, Germany
- Spremberg, Germany
- Uman, Ukraine
