= Monika Ciecierska =

Polish basketball player

Personal information
- Born: 23 October 1973 (age 53) Szprotawa, Poland
- Listed height: 1.83 m (6 ft 0 in)
- Position: Small forward / power forward

Career history
- 1990-1990: AZS Zielona Góra
- 1992-1998: Stilon Gorzów Wielkopolski
- 1998-1999: Lotos Gdynia
- 1999-2001: Start Gdańsk
- 2001-2003: CCC Polkowice
- 2003-2007: AZS Poznań

Monika Ciecierska (born 23 October 1973) is a former Polish female professional basketball player.
