= Siecieborzyce =

- Village
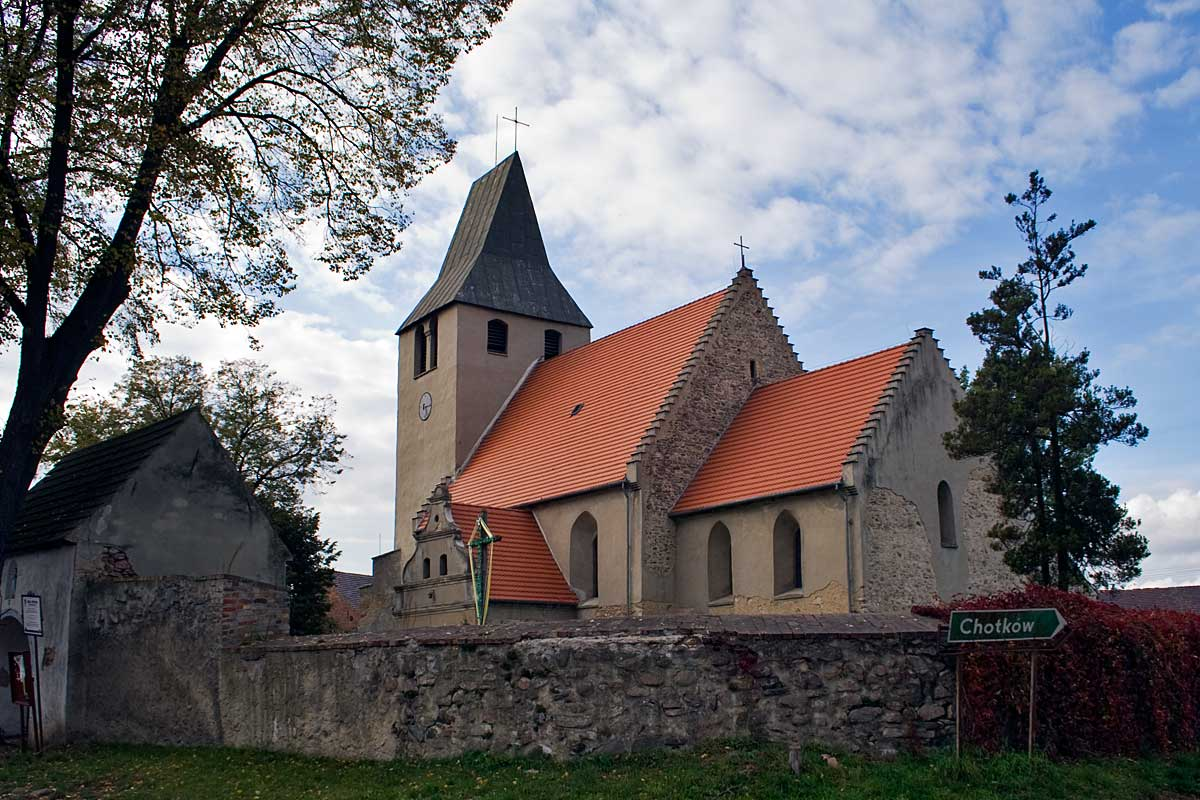
- Saint Mary church of the Maternity in Siecieborzyce

- Location within Poland
- Coordinates: 51°40′11″N 15°33′28″E
- Country: Poland
- Voivodeship: Lubusz
- County: Żagań
- Gmina: Szprotawa
- First mentioned: 1273

Population
  - Total: 970
- Time zone: UTC+1 (CET)
  - Summer (DST): UTC+2 (CEST)
- Postal code: 67-130
- Vehicle registration: FZG

Siecieborzyce [ɕɛt͡ɕɛbɔˈʐɨt͡sɛ] is a village in the administrative district of Gmina Szprotawa, within Żagań County, Lubusz Voivodeship, in western Poland.

== History ==
The village was first mentioned in 1273, when it was part of Piast-ruled Poland. In the 18th century the village was annexed by Prussia, and from 1871 to 1945 it also formed part of Germany. After the defeat of Nazi Germany in World War II in 1945, the village became again part of Poland.
