= Sieraków, Lubusz Voivodeship =

Sieraków
- Village
- Location within Poland
- Coordinates: 51°29′0″N 15°35′53″E
- Country: Poland
- Voivodeship: Lubusz
- County: Żagań
- Gmina: Szprotawa
- Population (2012): 121

Sieraków (Polish pronunciation: [ɕɛˈrakuf]) is a village in the administrative district of Gmina Szprotawa, within Żagań County, Lubusz Voivodeship, in western Poland.
