= Henryków, Lubusz Voivodeship =

Henryków
- Village
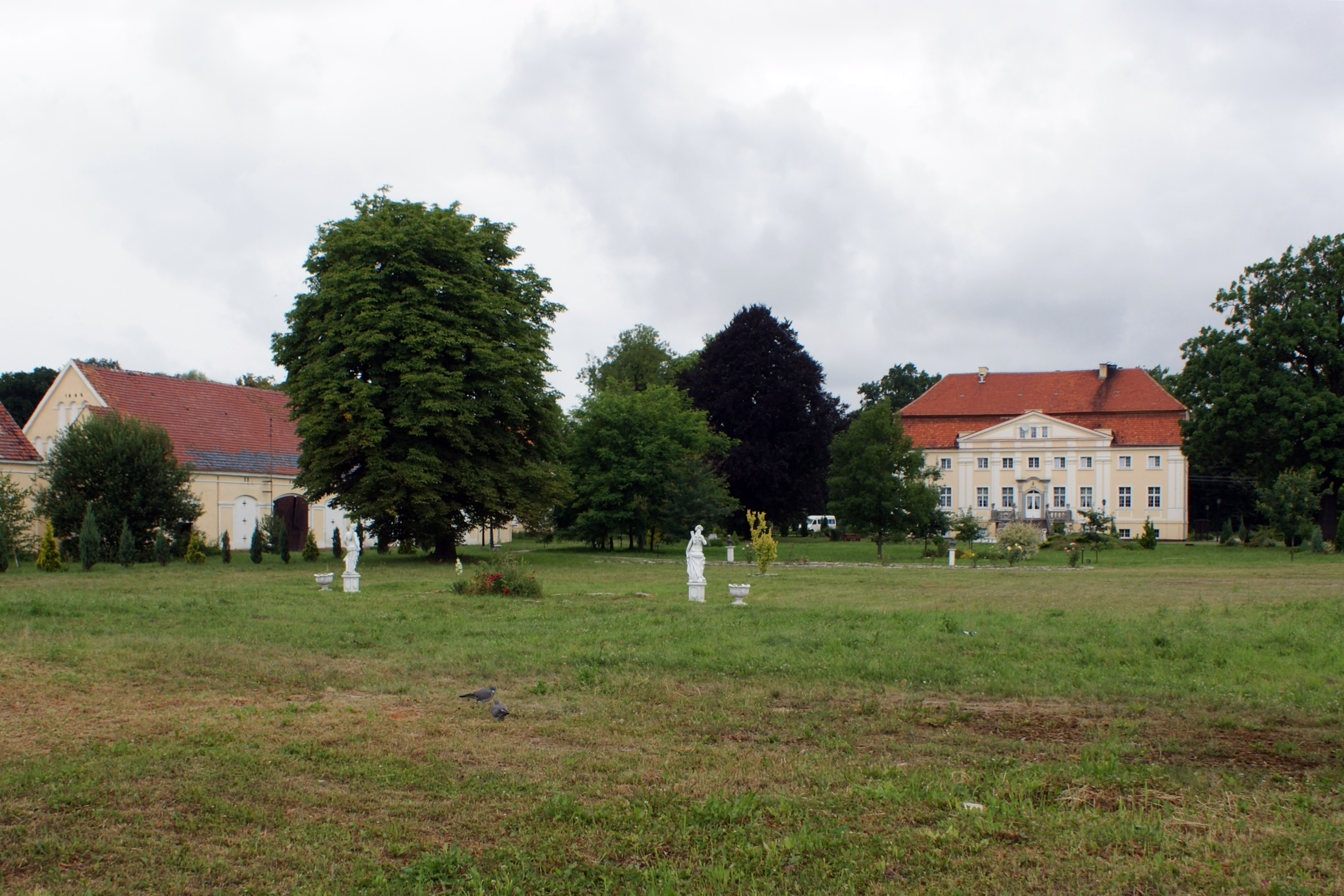

- Location within Poland
- Coordinates: 51°34′13″N 15°34′24″E
- Country: Poland
- Voivodeship: Lubusz
- County: Żagań
- Gmina: Szprotawa

Henryków [xɛnˈrɨkuf] is a village in the administrative district of Gmina Szprotawa, within Żagań County, Lubusz Voivodeship, in western Poland.
