= Witków, Lubusz Voivodeship =

Witków
- Village
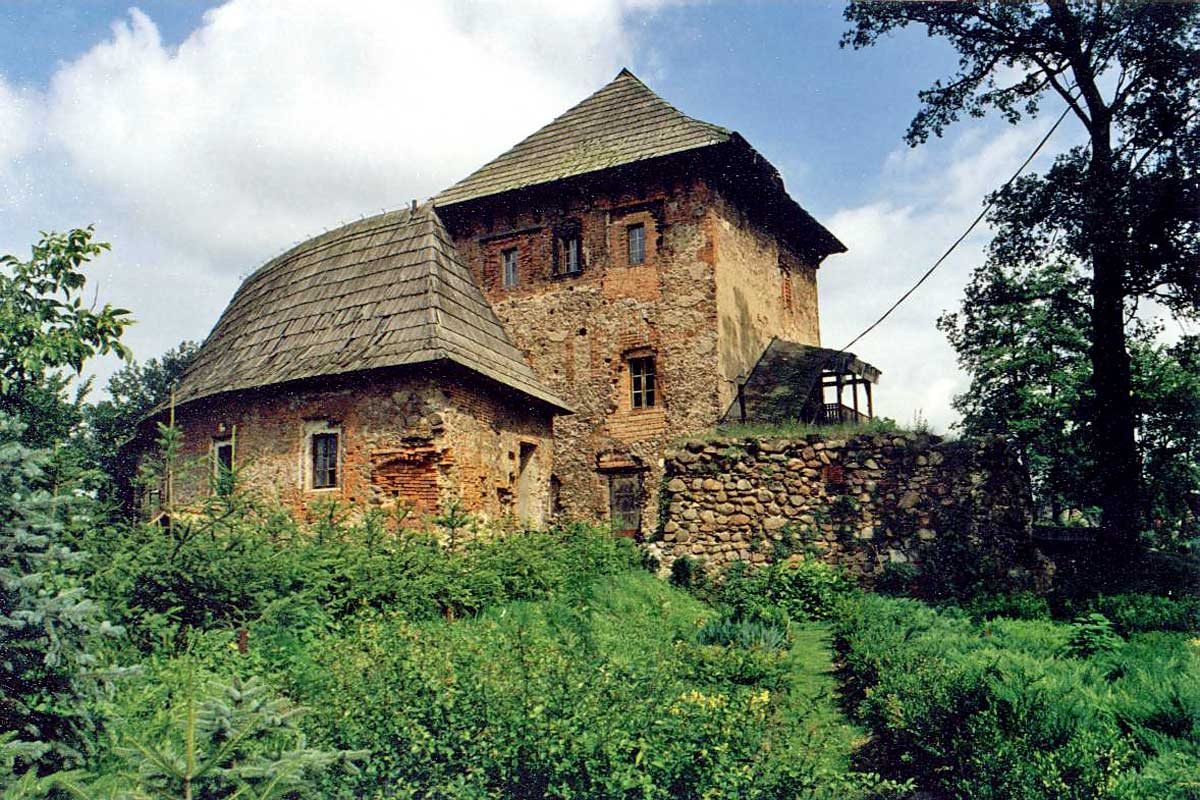
- Witków castle

- Location within Poland
- Coordinates: 51°37′46″N 15°31′11″E
- Country: Poland
- Voivodeship: Lubusz
- County: Żagań
- Gmina: Szprotawa
- Population: 600

Witków [ˈvitkuf] is a village in the administrative district of Gmina Szprotawa, within Żagań County, Lubusz Voivodeship, in western Poland.
