= Nowa Kopernia =

- Village
- Location within Poland
- Coordinates: 51°32′33″N 15°33′46″E
- Country: Poland
- Voivodeship: Lubusz
- County: Żagań
- Gmina: Szprotawa

Nowa Kopernia [ˈnɔva kɔˈpɛrɲa] is a village in the administrative district of Gmina Szprotawa, within Żagań County, Lubusz Voivodeship, in western Poland.
