= Dzikowice =

- Village
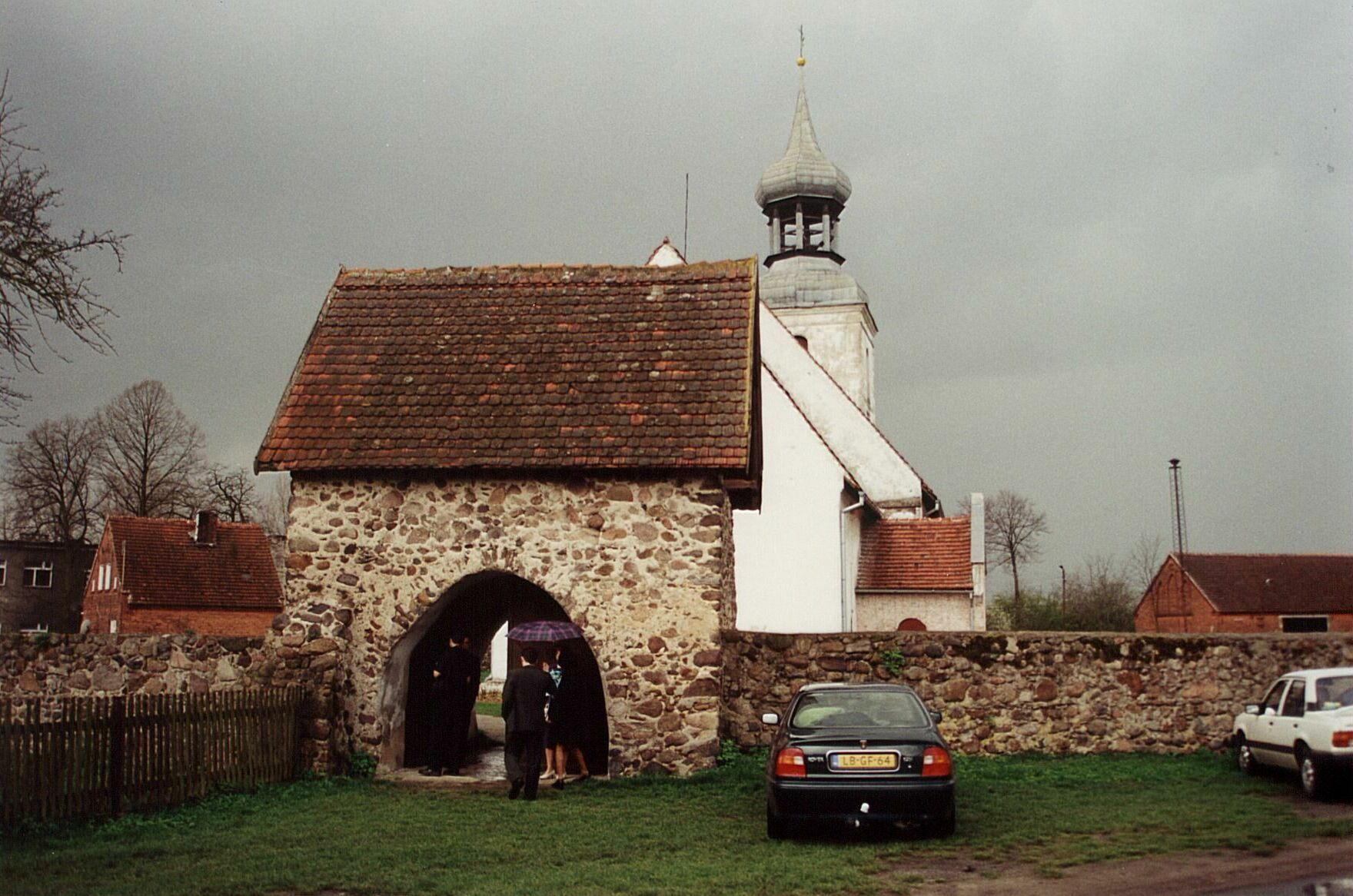

- Location within Poland
- Coordinates: 51°36′N 15°36′E
- Country: Poland
- Voivodeship: Lubusz
- County: Żagań
- Gmina: Szprotawa
- Population: 526

Dzikowice [d͡ʑikɔˈvit͡sɛ] is a village in the administrative district of Gmina Szprotawa, within Żagań County, Lubusz Voivodeship, in western Poland.
