= Leszno Dolne =

- Village
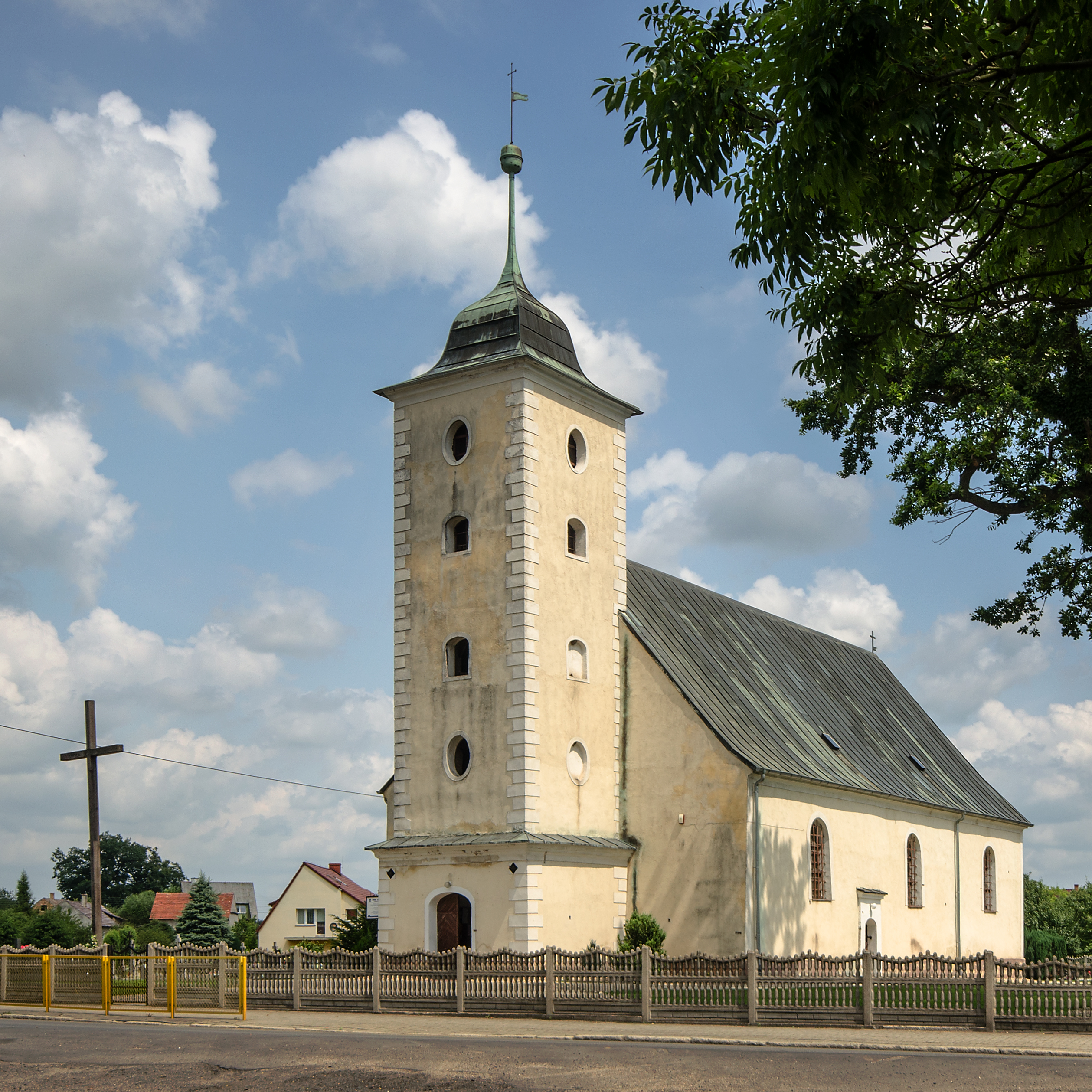
- Church of the Assumption in Leszno Dolne

- Location within Poland
- Coordinates: 51°30′51″N 15°36′22″E
- Country: Poland
- Voivodeship: Lubusz
- County: Żagań
- Gmina: Szprotawa
- First mentioned: 1260
- Population: 320
- Time zone: UTC+1 (CET)
  - Summer (DST): UTC+2 (CEST)
- Vehicle registration: FZG

Leszno Dolne [ˈlɛʂnɔ ˈdɔlnɛ] is a village in the administrative district of Gmina Szprotawa, within Żagań County, Lubusz Voivodeship, in western Poland.

The village was first mentioned in 1260, when it was part of Piast-ruled Poland. In the 18th century it was annexed by Prussia, and from 1871 to 1945 it also formed part of Germany. After the defeat of Nazi Germany in World War II in 1945, it became again part of Poland.
