= Borowina, Lubusz Voivodeship =

Borowina
- Village
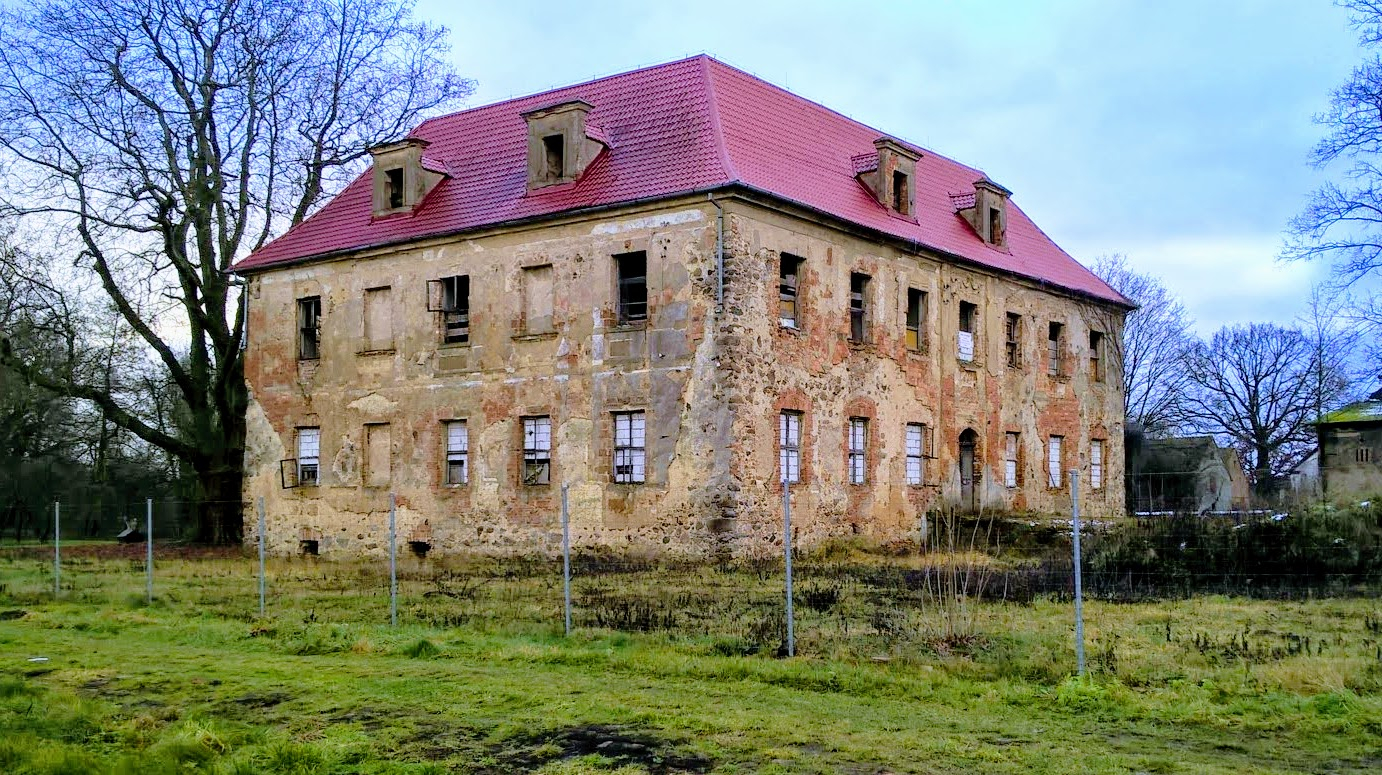
- Palace

- Location within Poland
- Coordinates: 51°38′8″N 15°35′2″E
- Country: Poland
- Voivodeship: Lubusz
- County: Żagań
- Gmina: Szprotawa
- Population (2021): 272

Borowina [bɔrɔˈvina] is a village in the administrative district of Gmina Szprotawa, within Żagań County, Lubusz Voivodeship, in western Poland.
