= Bobrowice, Żagań County =

Bobrowice
- Village
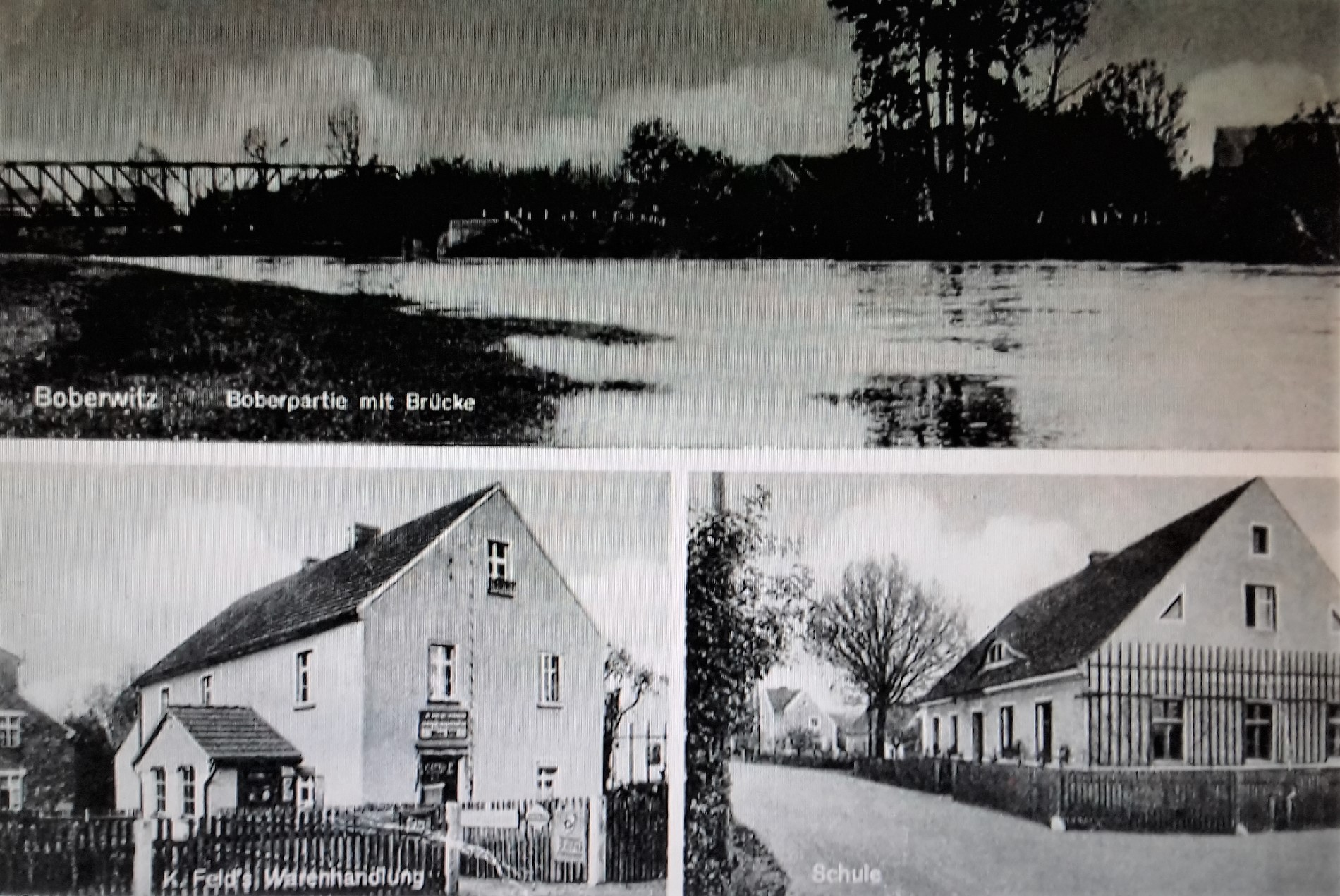

- Location within Poland
- Coordinates: 51°31′1″N 15°35′44″E
- Country: Poland
- Voivodeship: Lubusz
- County: Żagań
- Gmina: Szprotawa

Bobrowice [bɔbrɔˈvit͡sɛ] is a village in the administrative district of Gmina Szprotawa, Żagań County, Lubusz Voivodeship, Poland.
