= Biernatów, Lubusz Voivodeship =

Village in Lubusz Voivodeship, western Poland

Biernatów
- Village
- Location within Poland
- Coordinates: 51°29′11″N 15°39′17″E
- Country: Poland
- Voivodeship: Lubusz
- County: Żagań
- Gmina: Szprotawa
- Population (2022): 28

Biernatów [bjɛrˈnatuf] is a village in the administrative district of Gmina Szprotawa, within Żagań County, Lubusz Voivodeship, in western Poland.
