= Długie, Żagań County =

Długie
- Village
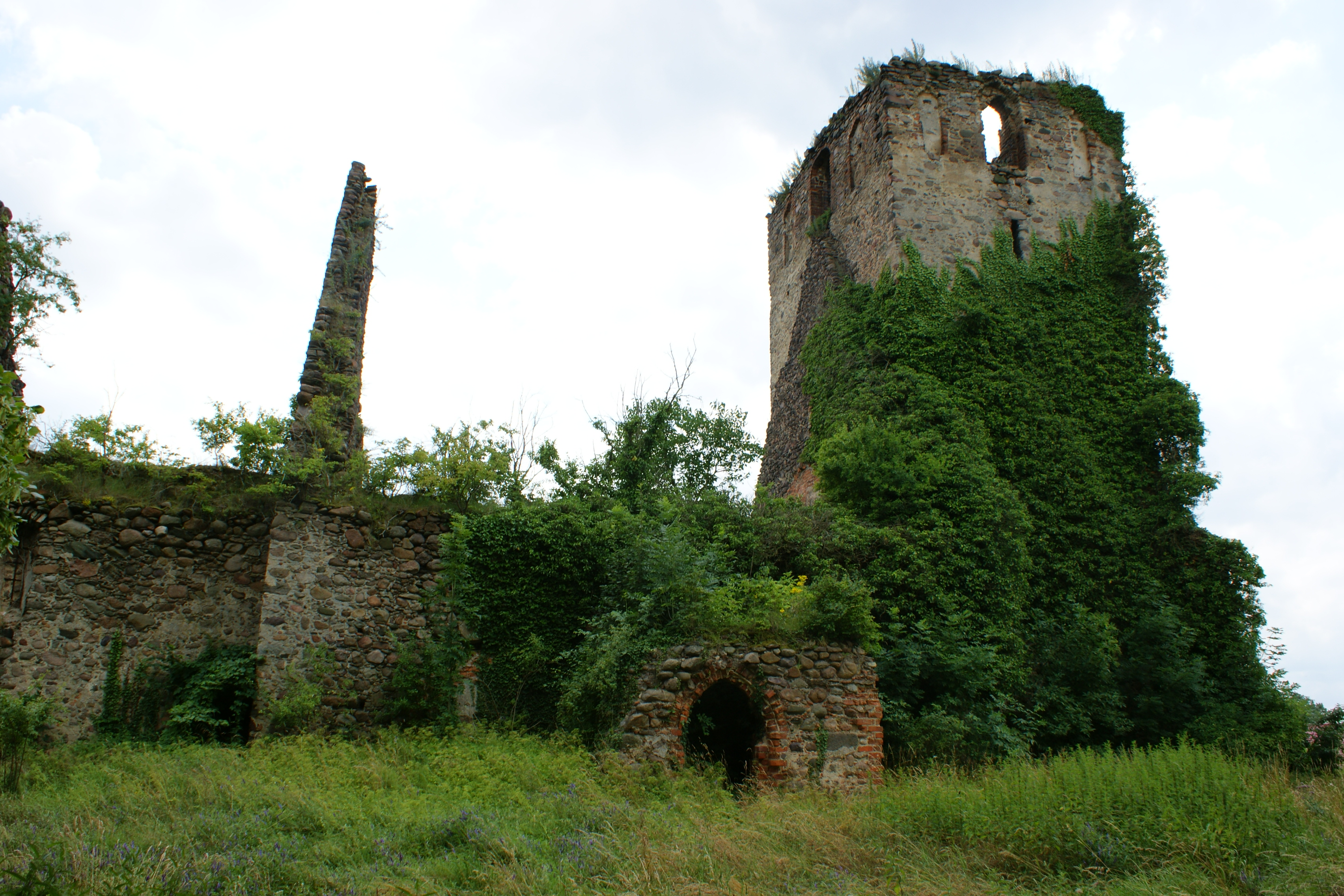

- Location within Poland
- Coordinates: 51°39′15″N 15°38′43″E
- Country: Poland
- Voivodeship: Lubusz
- County: Żagań
- Gmina: Szprotawa
- Population: 1,100

Długie [ˈdwuɡʲɛ] is a village in the administrative district of Gmina Szprotawa, within Żagań County, Lubusz Voivodeship, in western Poland.
