= Muzeum Ziemi Szprotawskiej =

Coordinates: 51°33′50″N 15°32′09″E

Muzeum Ziemi Szprotawskiej (Polish: Museum of the Szprotawa Land), established 2000 by Towarzystwo Bory Dolnośląskie (Polish: The Lower Silesia Deep Woods Appreciation Society). It is the local center for historical and archaeological research pertaining to the old Szprotawa District, for the towns of Szprotawa, Małomice, Przemków and Niegosławice.

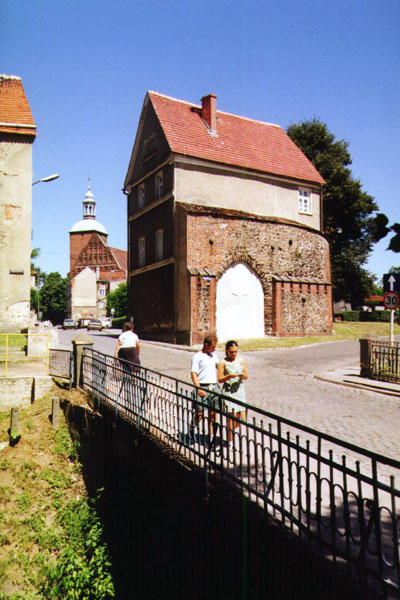
Museum of the Szprotawa Land is located since 2003 inside historic Brama Żagańska, a preserved fragment of town fortifications that doubled as a building and a gate.

In the museum structure are included: archaeology with history, archive, nature and tourism. The stable exhibitions concern general: The Stone Age, Bronze Age, Middle Ages, Iron Age and Modern Times (Germans and Soviets in Szprotawa).

== Exhibits ==
The most important exhibits are:

- A peculiar sword from the 16th century
- An anonymous chronicle of district Szprotawa from the 18th century
- A dowry coffer from the 18th century
- A bomber ball (projectile) from the 15th century
- Some urns dating from prehistoric times
- A gravestone of Vogdt from the 18th century
- Heavy machine guns from the former World War II German military airport Sprottau.

Apart from its educational mission, the museum's most important work is carrying out investigations of the Silesia Walls, earthen structures running for quite a distance in the surrounding countryside, the earthen remnants of the Chrobry fortified town, the Flins, the Sprottau Castle, and the Battle of Primkenau of 1015.

== Gallery ==
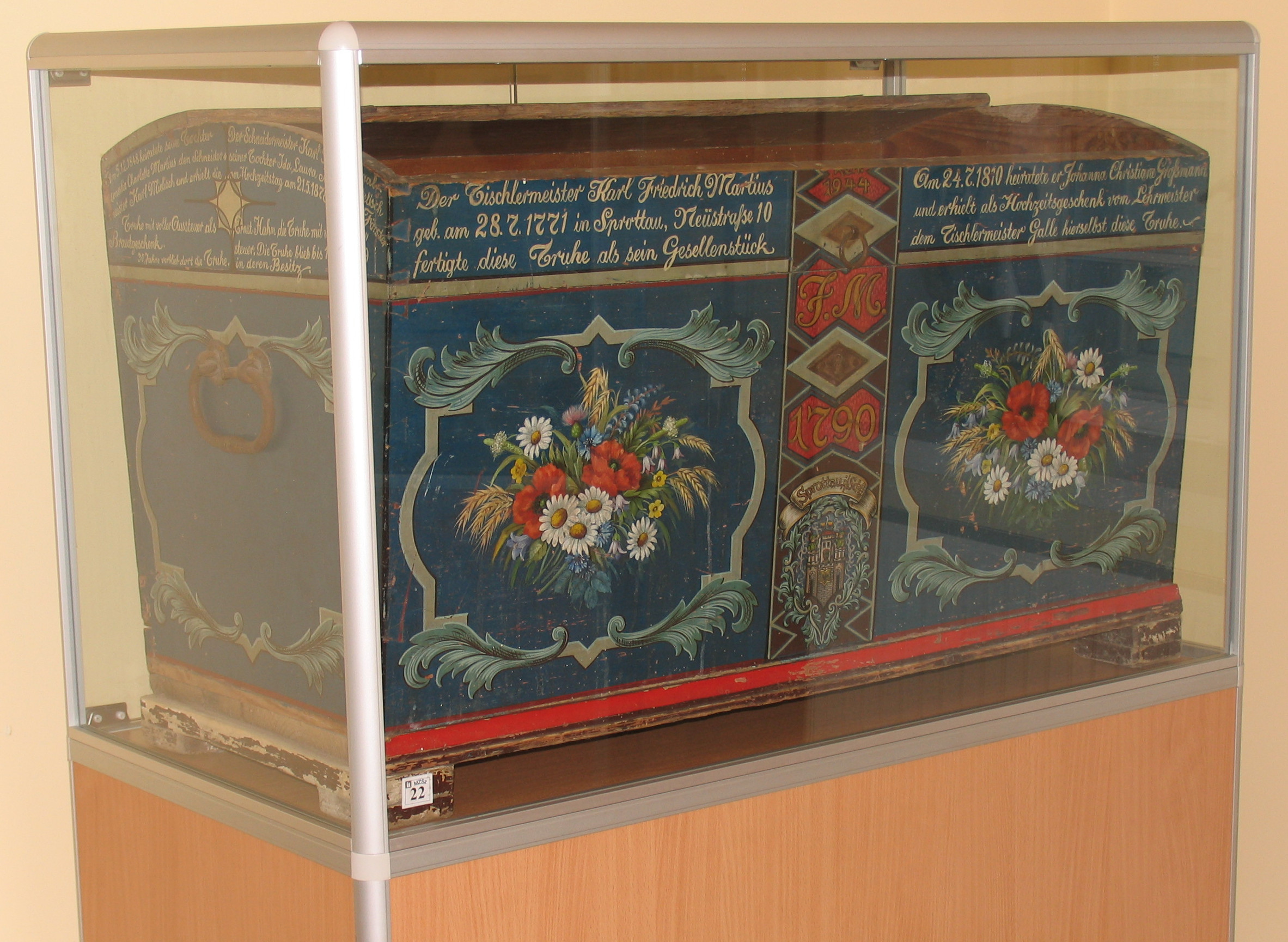
dowry coffer from 18th century

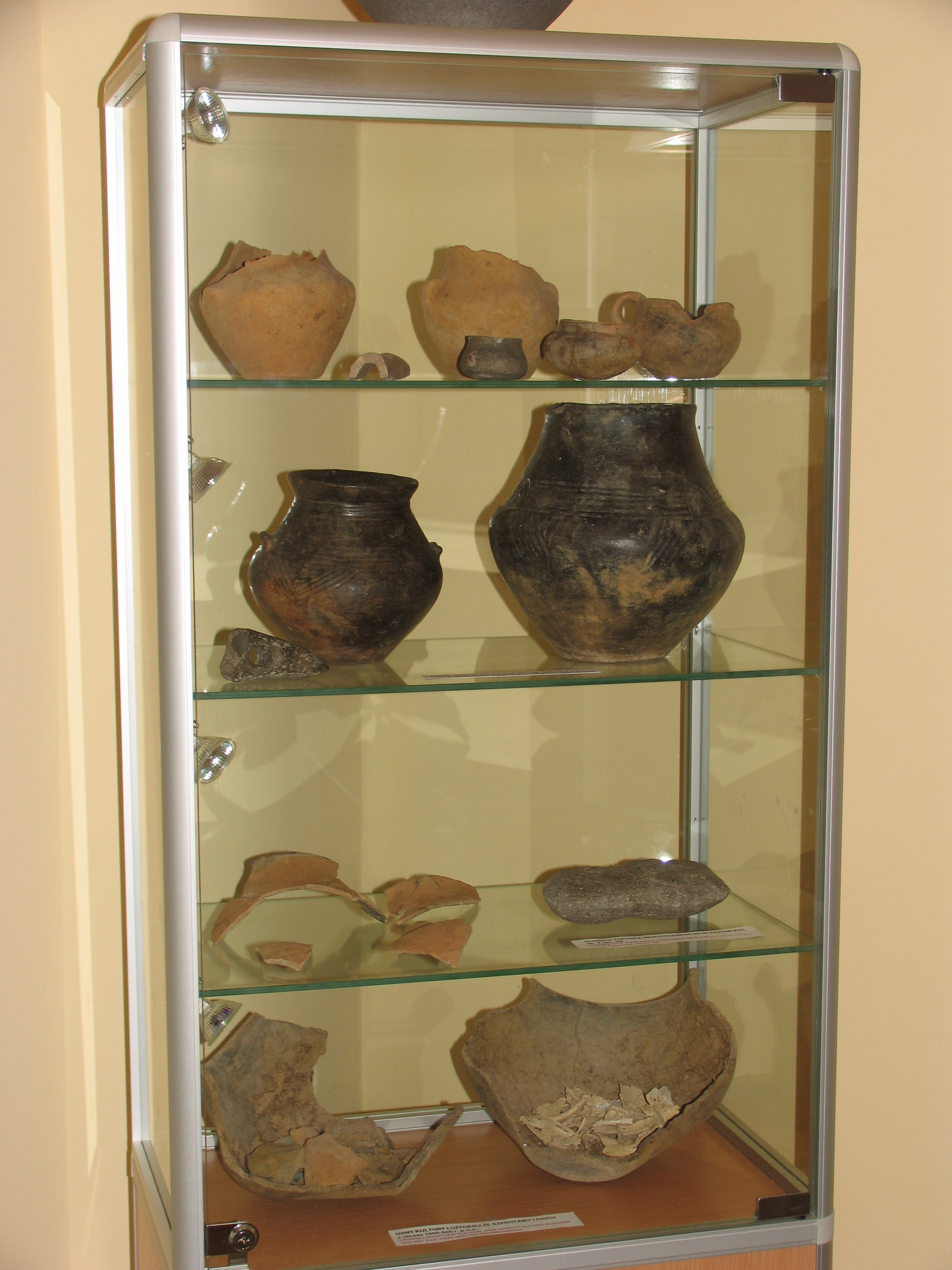
Ancient ceramics from Szprotawa Land
