= Leszno Górne =

- Village
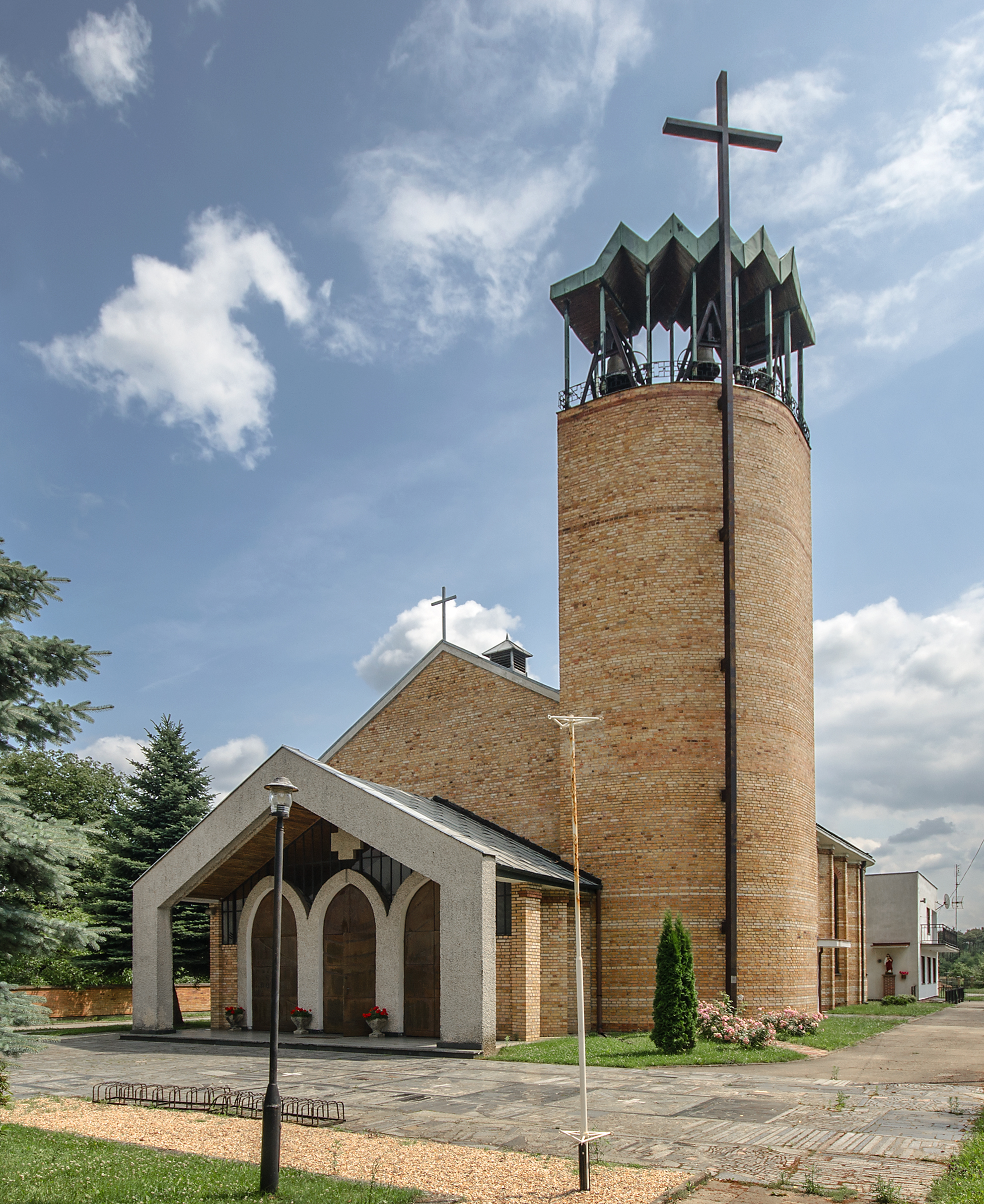
- Church of Our Lady Queen of Poland in Leszno Górne

- Location within Poland
- Coordinates: 51°28′N 15°37′E
- Country: Poland
- Voivodeship: Lubusz
- County: Żagań
- Gmina: Szprotawa
- First mentioned: 1260
- Elevation: 145 m (476 ft)
- Population (approx.): 1,600
- Time zone: UTC+1 (CET)
  - Summer (DST): UTC+2 (CEST)
- Vehicle registration: FZG

Leszno Górne [ˈlɛʂnɔ ˈɡurnɛ] is a village in the administrative district of Gmina Szprotawa, within Żagań County, Lubusz Voivodeship, in western Poland.

== History ==
The village was first mentioned in 1260, when it was part of Piast-ruled Poland. In the 18th century, it was annexed by Prussia, and from 1871 to 1945 it also formed part of Germany. During World War II, the Germans used prisoners of war as forced labour in the village. After the defeat of Nazi Germany in the war in 1945, it became again part of Poland.
