= Silesian Walls =

Earth ramparts in Poland

Coordinates: 51°29′50″N 15°37′08″E

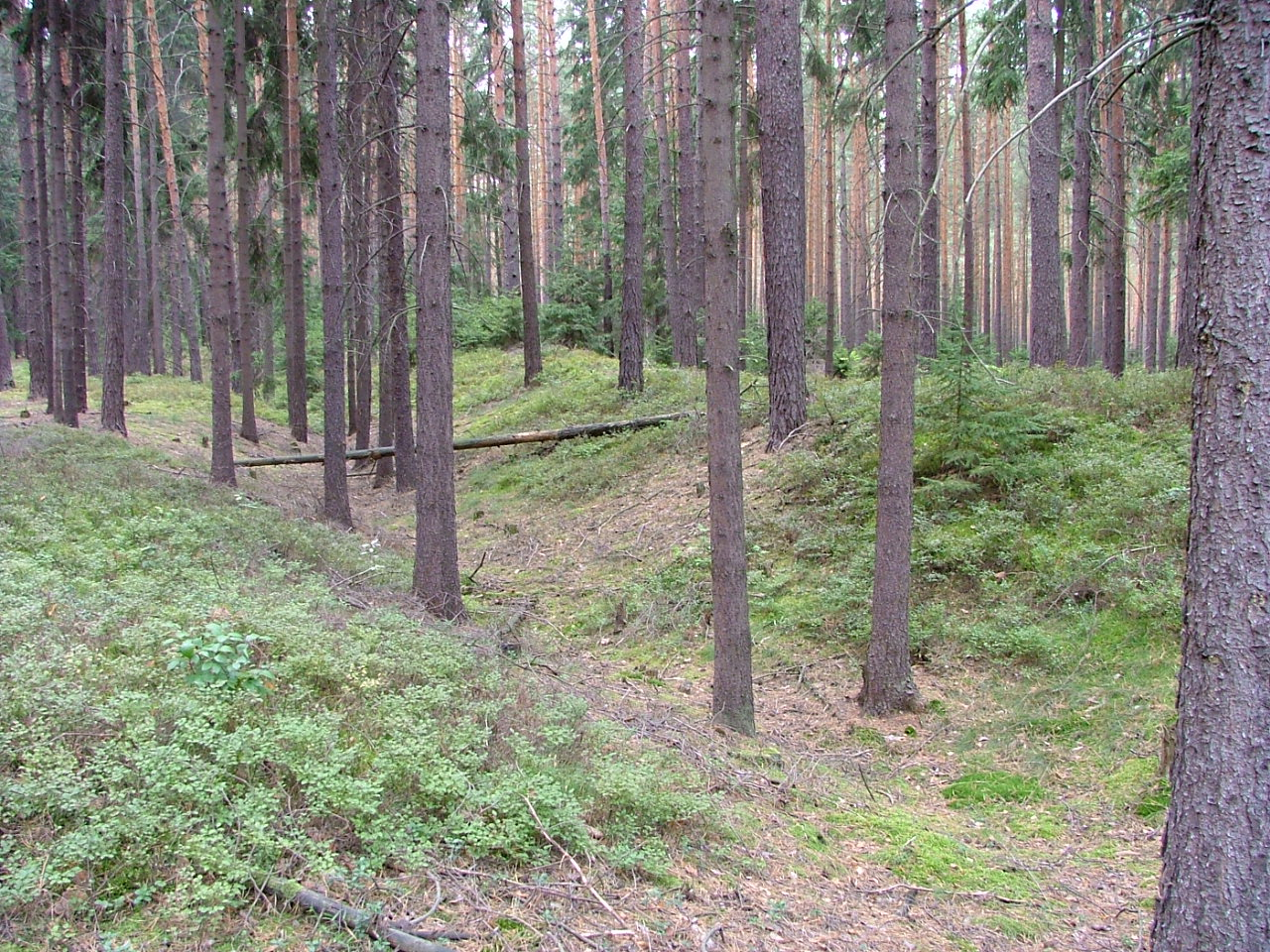
Silesia Walls near Szprotawa in Poland

The Silesian Walls (Polish: Wały Śląskie, German: Dreigräben) are a line of three (or sometimes fewer) parallel earthen ramparts and ditches that run through Lower Silesia in Poland, by the towns Szprotawa and Kożuchów. The walls are about 2.5 metres tall and, at their widest, 47 metres. They run for about 30 kilometres. It is hypothesized by Maciej Boryna of the Muzeum Ziemi Szprotawskiej that the Silesia Walls were the southwest border of the Duchy of Głogów and built in 1413–1467. It is possible that rather than being military in nature the walls were designed as a type of landwehr to reduce smuggling.
