= Kartowice =

- Village
- Location within Poland
- Coordinates: 51°35′38″N 15°31′54″E
- Country: Poland
- Voivodeship: Lubusz
- County: Żagań
- Gmina: Szprotawa

Kartowice [kartɔˈvit͡sɛ] is a village in the administrative district of Gmina Szprotawa, within Żagań County, Lubusz Voivodeship, in western Poland.
