= Wiechlice =

- Village
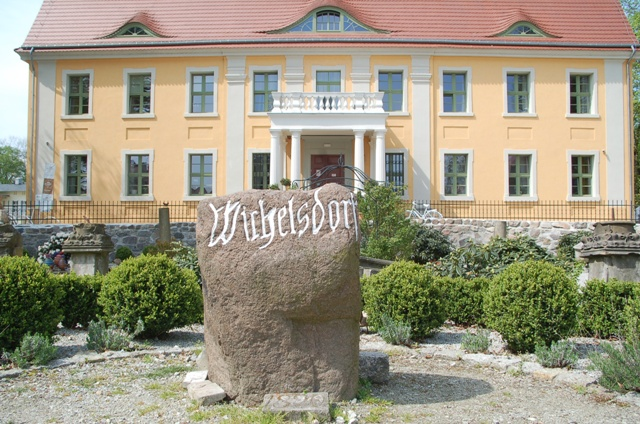
- Palace in Wiechlice

- Location within Poland
- Coordinates: 51°34′7″N 15°36′5″E
- Country: Poland
- Voivodeship: Lubusz
- County: Żagań
- Gmina: Szprotawa
- First mentioned: 1260
- Time zone: UTC+1 (CET)
  - Summer (DST): UTC+2 (CEST)
- Vehicle registration: FZG

Wiechlice [vjɛˈxlit͡sɛ] is a village in the administrative district of Gmina Szprotawa, within Żagań County, Lubusz Voivodeship, in western Poland.

== History ==
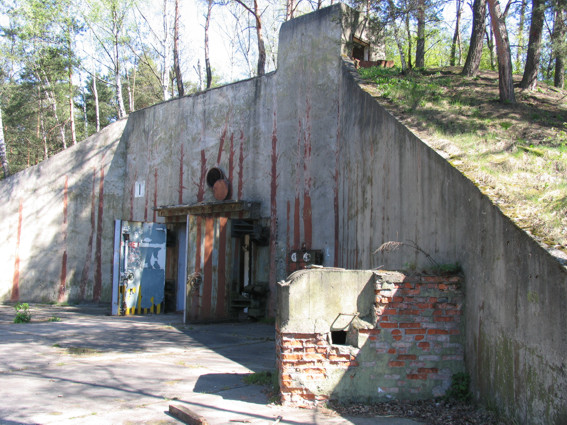
Nuclear bunker in Wiechlice

The village was first mentioned in 1260 as Vechlic, when it was part of Piast-ruled Poland. In the 18th century it was annexed by Prussia. During the Napoleonic Wars a temporary hospital for French troops was created in the local palace. From 1871 to 1945 the village also formed part of Germany. During World War I, Germany operated a prisoner-of-war camp in the village, whose prisoners were the English, French, Belgians, Italians, Serbs, Romanians and Russians. In 1918–1919, Polish insurgents of the Greater Poland uprising were imprisoned at the camp. There is a cemetery of the prisoners of war from World War I and a monument to imprisoned Polish insurgents at the site. After the defeat of Nazi Germany in World War II in 1945, the village became again part of Poland. A nuclear bunker was built in the 1960s.
