= Szprotawa =

Town in Lubusz Voivodeship, Poland

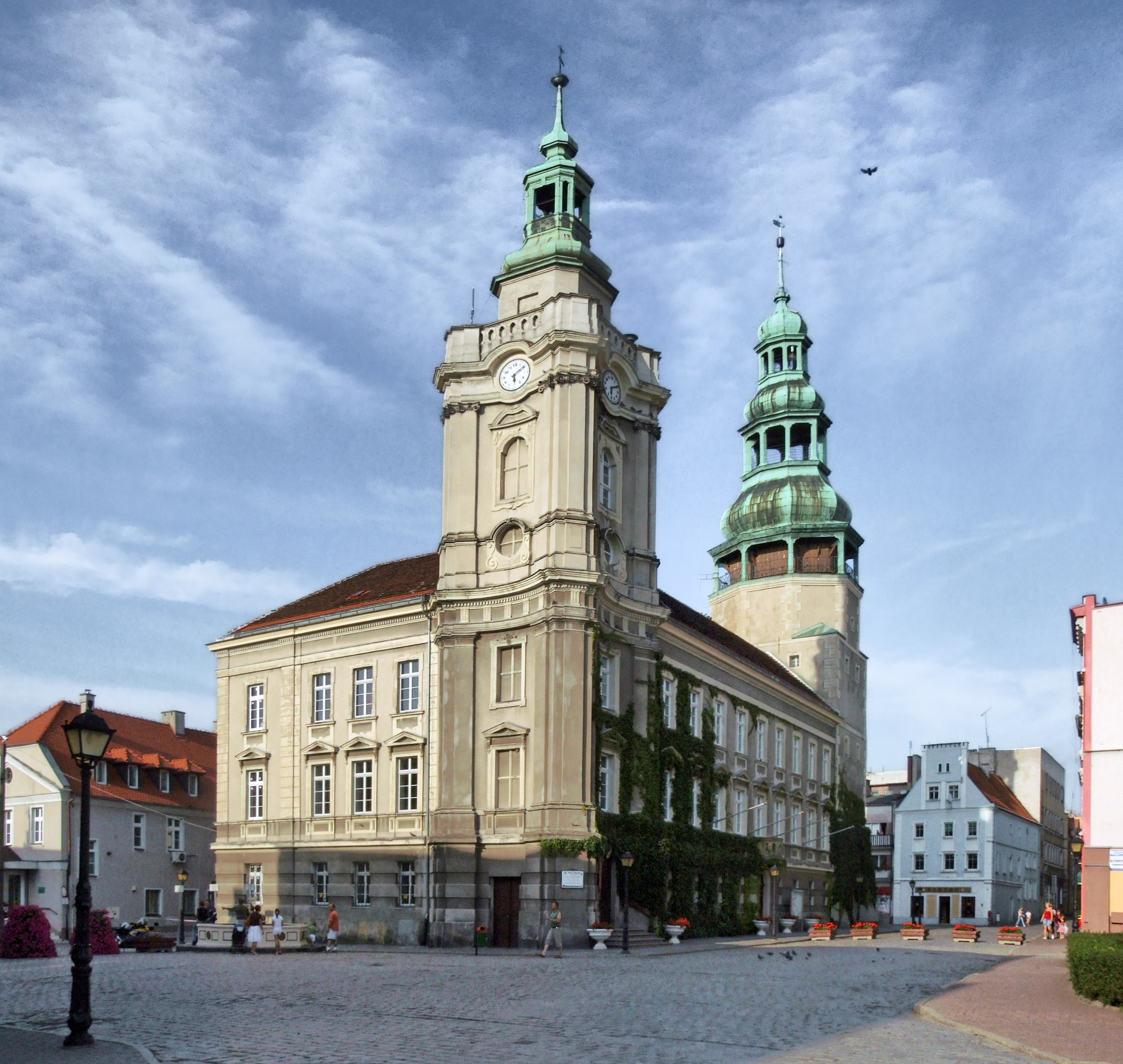
- Szprotawa town hall

- Coat of arms

- Location within Poland
- Coordinates: 51°34′N 15°30′E
- Country: Poland
- Voivodeship: Lubusz
- County: Żagań
- Gmina: Szprotawa
- Town rights: around 1260

Government
  - Mayor: Mirosław Gąsik

Area
  - Total: 10.94 km^{2} (4.22 sq mi)

Population (2019-06-30)
  - Total: 11,820
  - Density: 1,080/km^{2} (2,798/sq mi)
- Time zone: UTC+1 (CET)
  - Summer (DST): UTC+2 (CEST)
- Postal code: 67-300
- Car plates: FZG
- Website: szprotawa.pl

Szprotawa [ʂprɔˈtava] (German: Sprottau) is a town in western Poland, in Żagań County, Lubusz Voivodeship. Founded in the Middle Ages, Szprotawa features several heritage sites, including medieval defensive walls, Romanesque and Gothic churches, a Renaissance town hall, and the Museum of the Szprotawa Land.

The town had 11,820 inhabitants in 2019.

== Geography ==
The town is situated at the confluence of the Szprotawa and Bóbr rivers, within the historic region of Lower Silesia.

== History ==
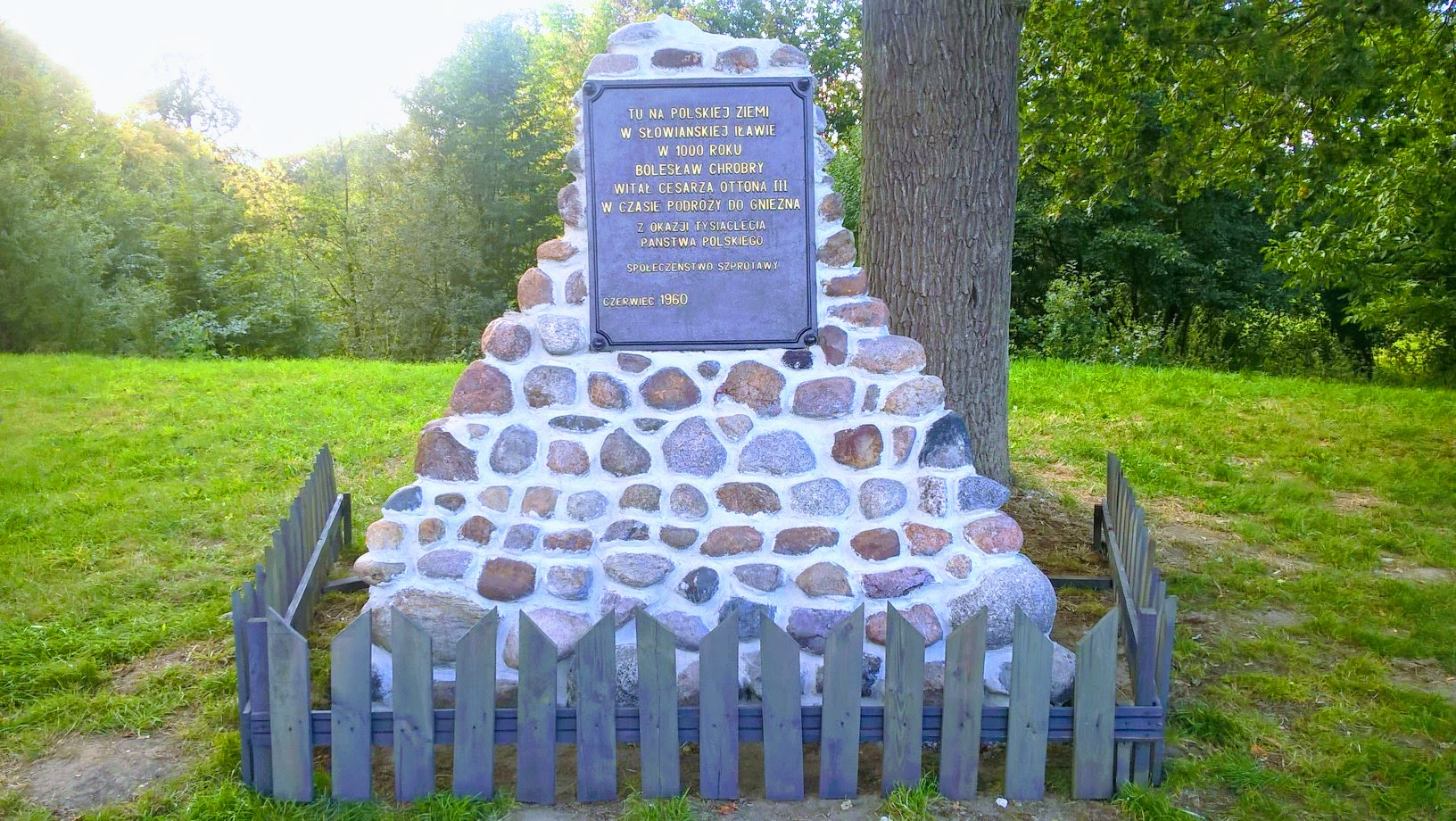
Monument commemorating the meeting of Bolesław the Brave and Otto III in 1000

The region was part of Poland after the emergence of the Piast monarchy in the 10th century. The first mention of today's Szprotawa comes at 1000 in the chronicle of bishop Thietmar of Merseburg, who accompanied the Holy Roman Emperor Otto III on pilgrimage to the grave of Saint Adalbert in Gniezno. Iława, currently a district of Szprotawa, is one of the two hypothetical locations where Otto III and Polish ruler Bolesław the Brave could have met. The area was part of medieval Poland, and later on, it was part of the Polish Duchy of Głogów, created as a result of the fragmentation of Poland. It was ruled by the Piasts and Jagiellons, including future Kings of Poland John I Albert and Sigismund I the Old, until its dissolution in 1506. Szprotawa received town rights around 1260.

Szprotawa was granted town rights around 1260 by Piast Duke Konrad I of Głogów, who also erected new town walls. In the 13th century, Szprotawa was settled by Germans as part of the Ostsiedlung. In 1304, Szprotawa gained full town rights and privileges, including the internal organization of the City Council "Concilium Magistratus". In 1331, together with the Duchy of Głogów, Szprotawa, although ruled by the Polish Piast dynasty, became a fief of the Kingdom of Bohemia. In 1506 it was incorporated into the Bohemian Kingdom, although the Polish King Sigismund I the Old continued to claim the duchy and the town until 1508. It was since ruled directly by the Bohemian Jagiellons until 1526 and afterwards it was held by the House of Habsburg.

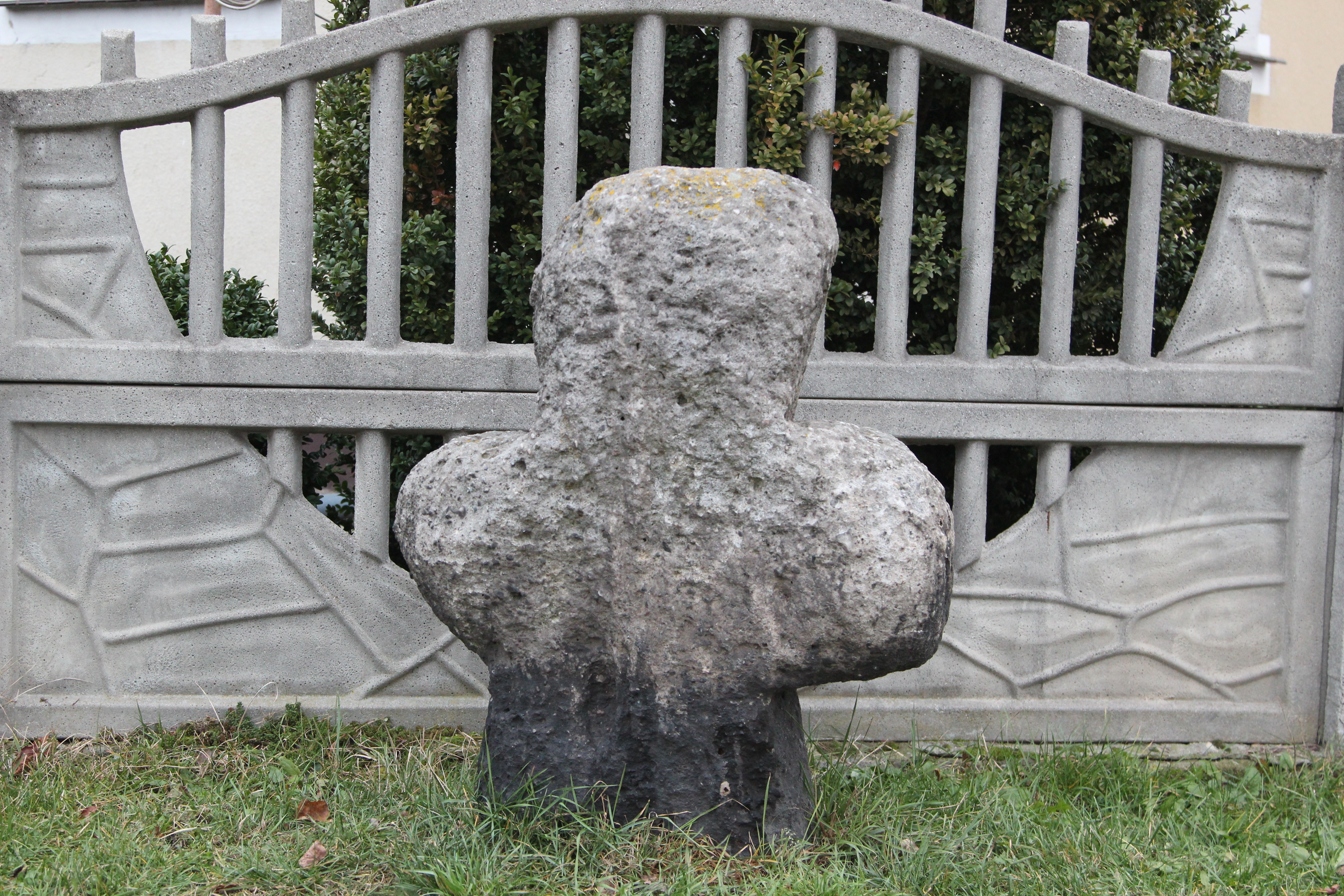
Old stone cross in Szprotawa

Since the Middle Ages, the town's wealth was primarily attributable to trade, mainly in cattle, salt and grain, from Silesia and Greater Poland to German states. From the 14th century hammer mills were also located there.

After the First Silesian War in 1742 Szprotawa, under the Germanized name Sprottau, fell to Prussia, like almost all Silesia. After the reorganization of Prussia in 1815, Sprottau became part of the province of Silesia, and from 1816, was the seat of the district of Sprottau, part of the government district of Liegnitz. With the Unification of Germany in 1871, Sprottau was incorporated into the German Empire.

In the first half of the 20th century, the city had an economic boom in the iron, textile and wax goods industry. The Wilhelmshütte iron and enamel companies of Aktiengesellschaft furnace employed more than 400 people. In 1939, the town had 12,578 inhabitants.

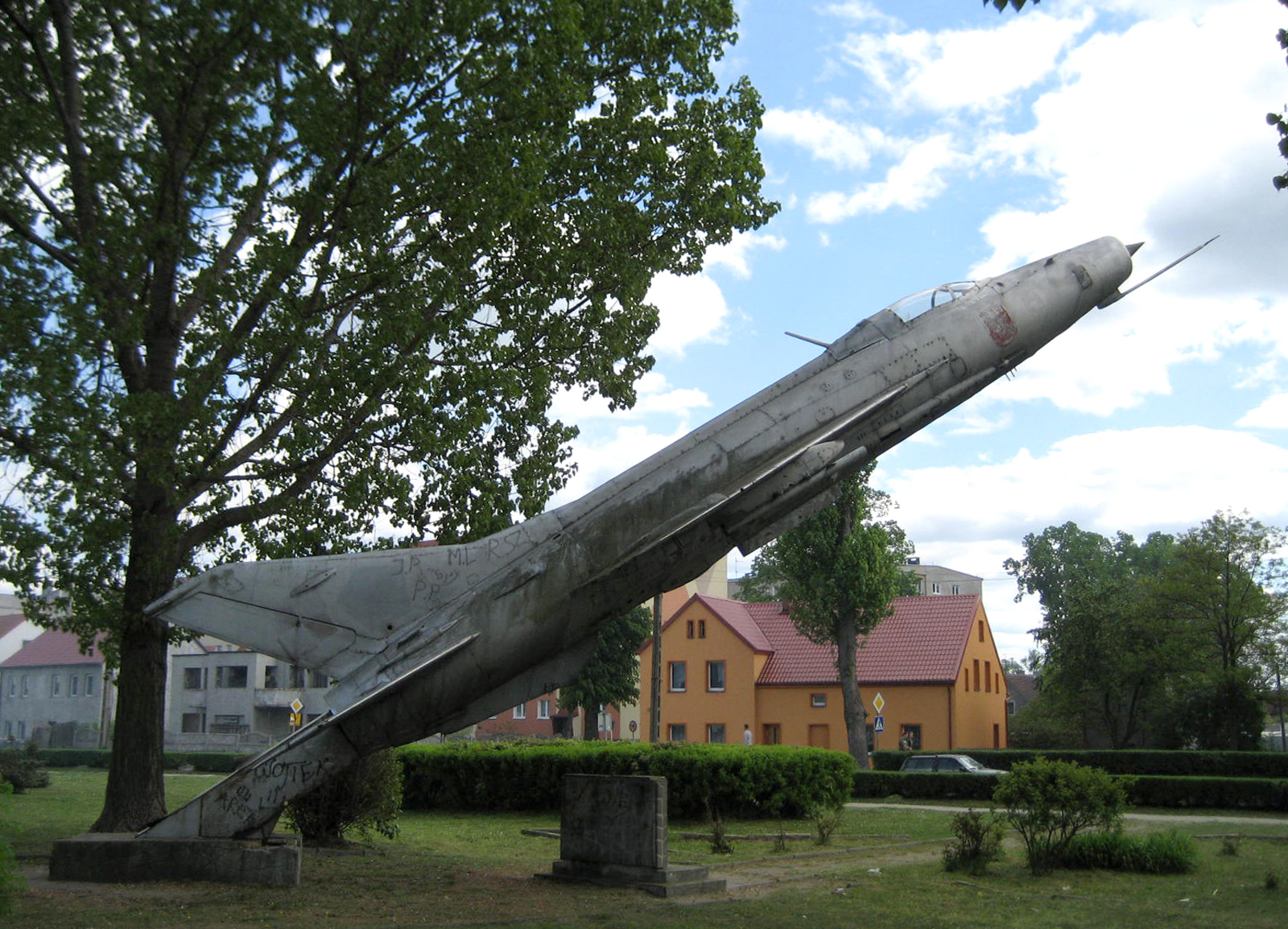
MiG-21F fighter jet as a monument to the victory over Nazi Germany

During World War II the Germans established two forced labour units of the prisoner-of-war camp in Żagań (then Sagan), intended for Italian and Soviet POWs. During the final stages of the war, 90% of the town was destroyed. After most of the local population had fled, the town was evacuated on January 2, 1945, and was occupied by the Red Army in the spring of 1945. After the war, per the Potsdam Agreement, the town became again part of Poland, although with a Soviet-installed communist regime, which stayed in power until the 1980s. What little was left of the town's German population was expelled and the town was rebuilt and settled by Poles.

In the following years, the Polish anti-communist resistance was active, including the nationwide Home Army-NIE-Freedom and Independence Association and the local Walcząca Polska (Fighting Poland) and Tajna Organizacja Podziemna (Secret Underground Organization) organizations.

From 1950 to 1975, the town served as a capital of a poviat.

In 2024, the town was affected by the 2024 Central European floods with parts of the town being evacuated.

== Sights ==
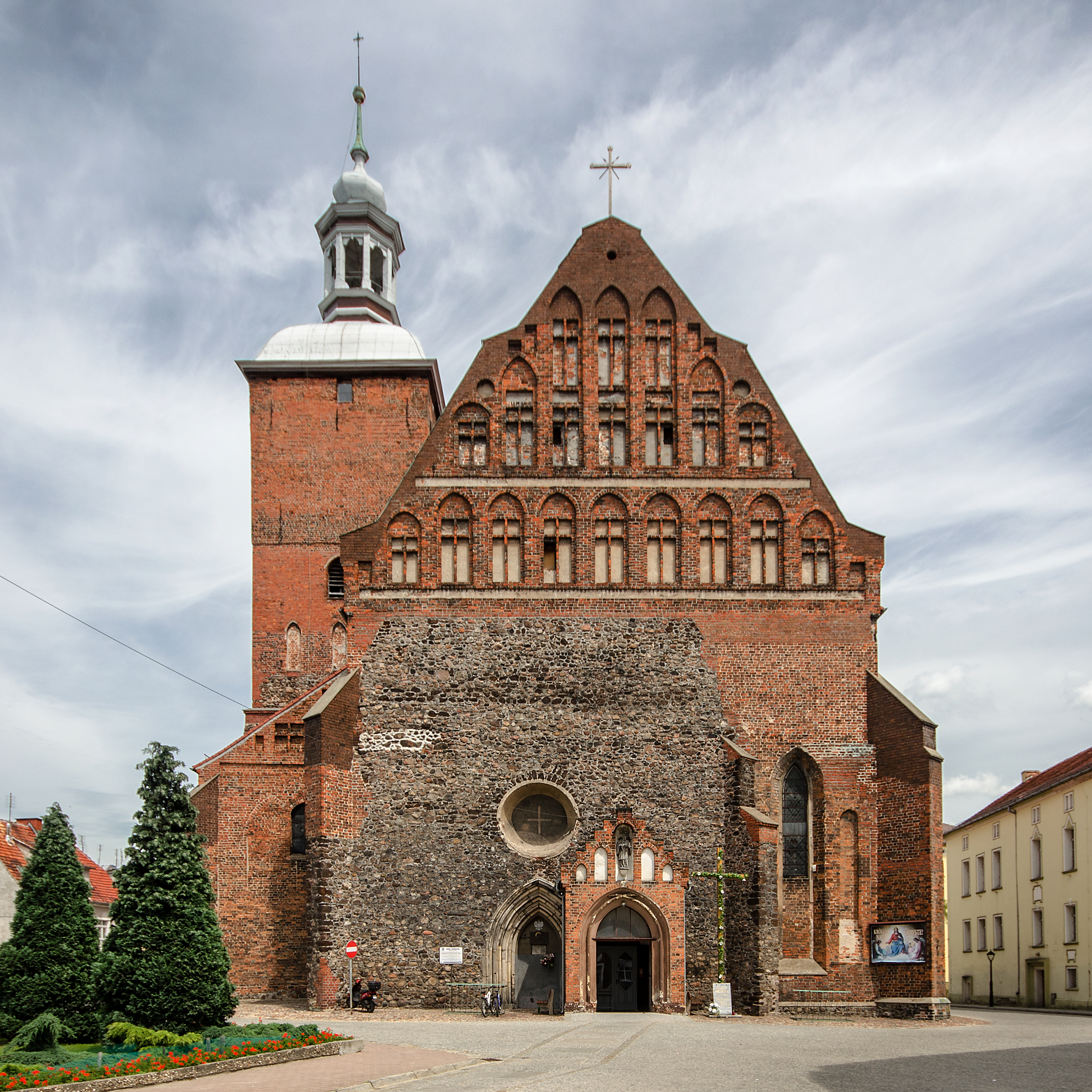
Gothic Church of the Assumption

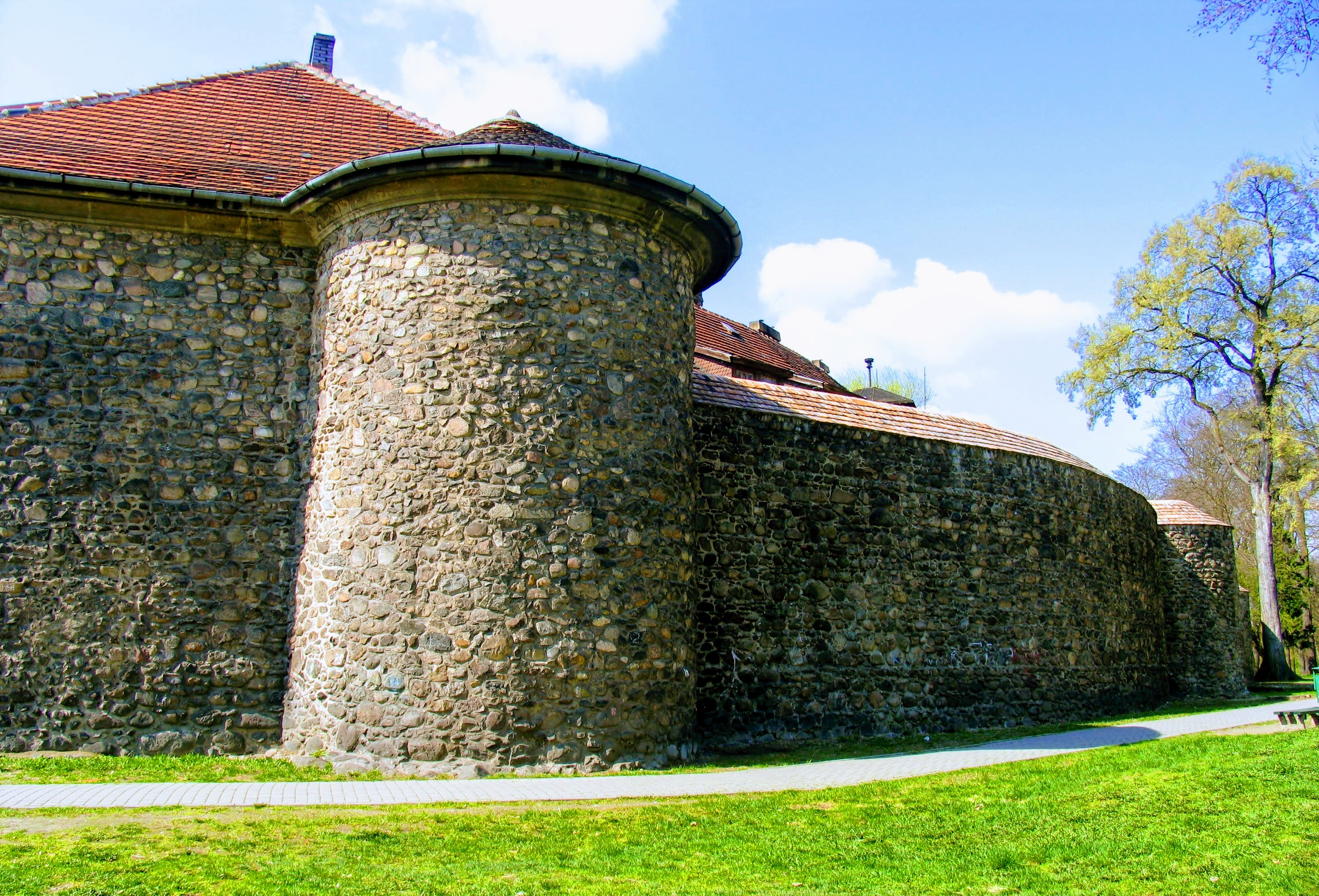
Medieval town walls

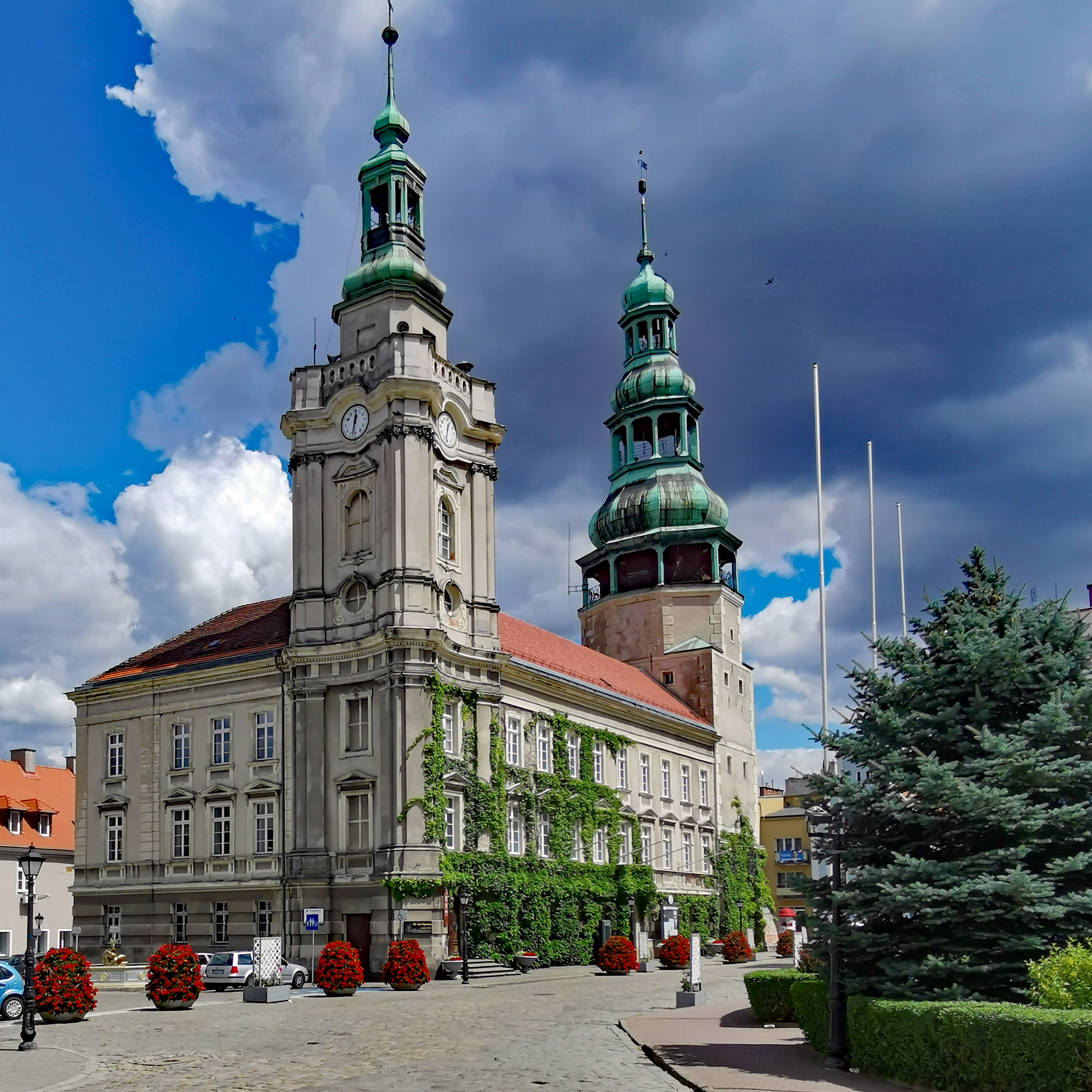
Town hall

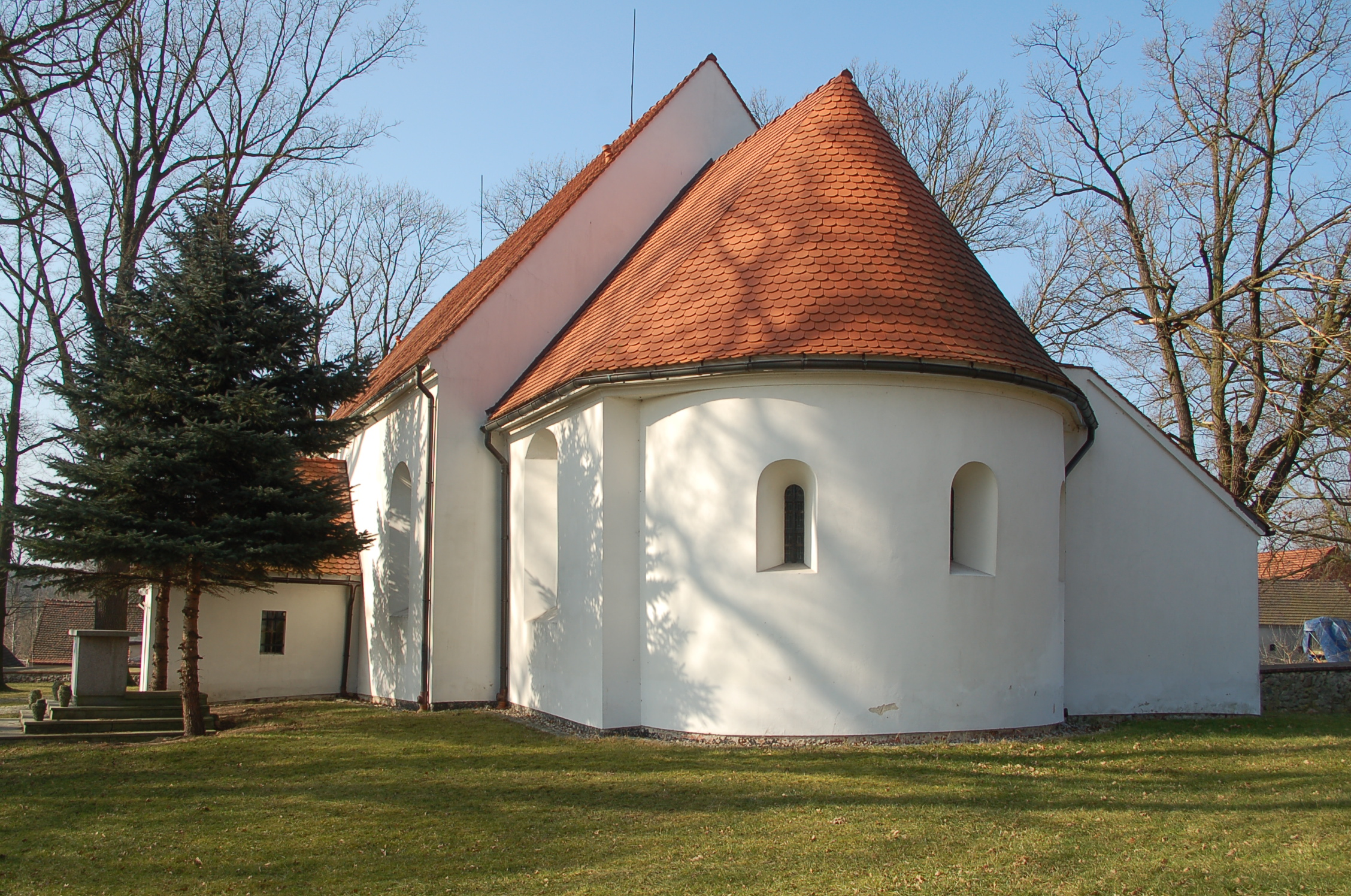
Romanesque Saint Andrew church

- Medieval town walls with the Żagań Gate (Brama Żagańska), from the Middle Ages, now housing the Museum of the Szprotawa Land (Muzeum Ziemi Szprotawskiej)
- Town hall (Ratusz), from the Renaissance
- Saint Andreas Roman Catholic Church, Romanesque, from the 13th century
- Church of the Assumption, Roman Catholic Church from the 13th century
- Evangelical Church, from the 18th century (old castle)
- Old military airport with nuclear weapons storage
- Chrobry Gord (archaeological earthwork)
- Silesia Walls

== Demographics ==
Historical population

Year	Pop.	±%
1880	7,231	—
1890	7,644	+5.7%
1900	7,846	+2.6%
1910	7,735	−1.4%
1925	10,366	+34.0%

Year	Pop.	±%
1933	11,993	+15.7%
1950	6,167	−48.6%
1960	9,438	+53.0%
2010	12,341	+30.8%

== Nature ==
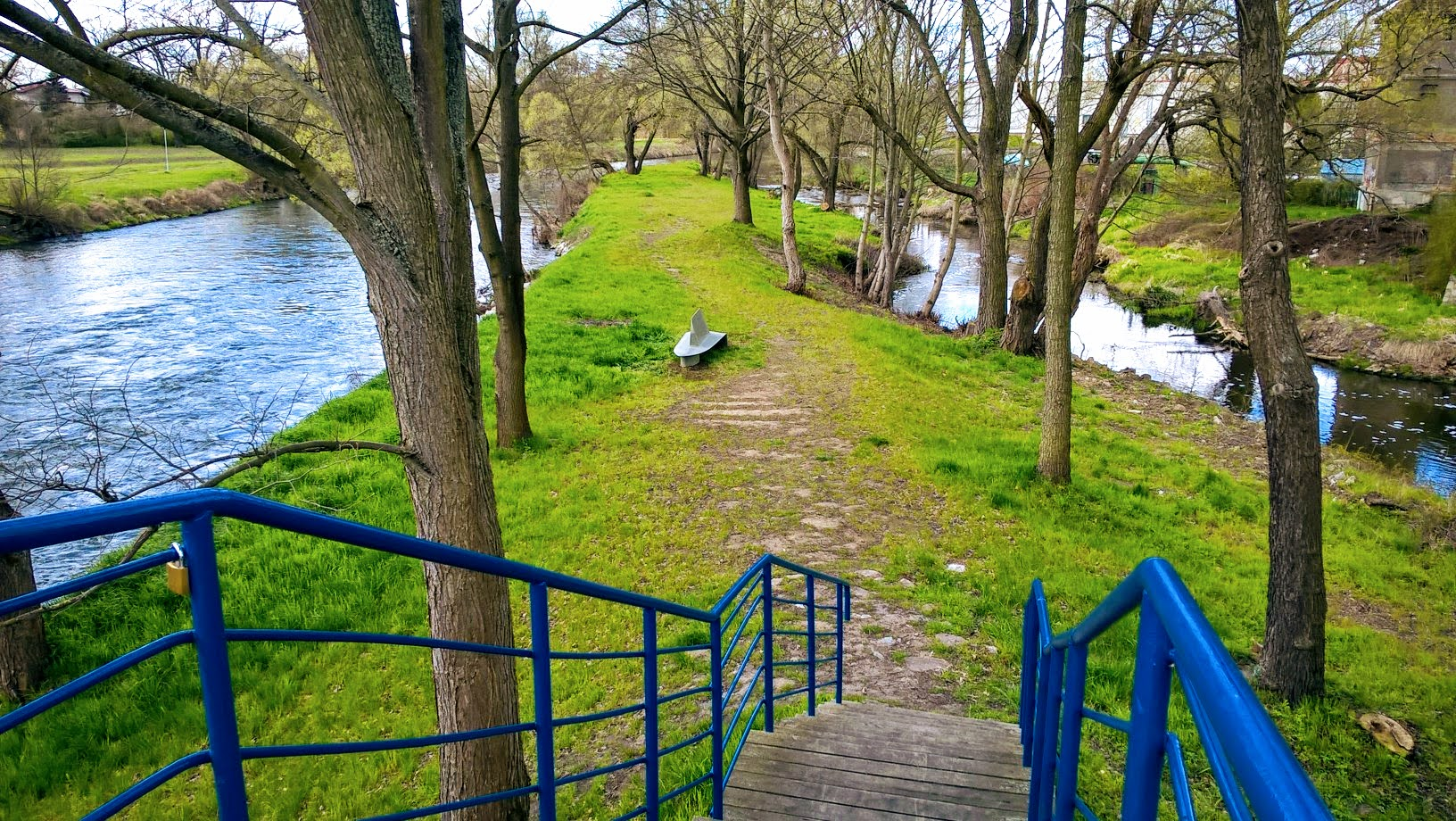
The mouth of the Szprotawa River (on the right) to the Bóbr river in Szprotawa

- Oak "Chrobry", the oldest in Poland (750 years old)
- Nature reserve "Buczyna Szprotawska"
- Nature reserve "Park Słowiański"
- Lower Silesia Forest
- Old city park from the 19th century

== Notable people ==
- Jakob Ebert (1549–1614), theologian
- Heinrich Göppert (1800–1884), scientist
- Heinrich Laube (1806–1884), author
- Karl Bartsch (1832–1888), Germanist
- Manfred Steinbach (born 1933), sportsman
- Klaus Hänsch (born 1938), politician, President of the European Parliament
- Rudolf Langer (born 1939), sportsman
- Detlev Kittstein (1944–1996), sportsman
- Monika Ciecierska (born 1973), basketball player
- Maciej Boryna (born 1974), writer
- Konrad Michalak (born 1997), footballer

== Twin towns – sister cities ==
See twin towns of Gmina Szprotawa.
