= Subdivisions of Bijeljina Municipality =

Coordinates: 44°45′25″N 19°12′58″E

Bijeljina municipality, Republika Srpska, Bosnia and Herzegovina, is divided into following subdivisions:

Amajlije • Balatun • Banjica • Batar • Batković • Bijeljina • Bjeloševac • Brijesnica • Brodac Donji • Brodac Gornji • Bukovica Donja • Bukovica Gornja • Crnjelovo Donje • Crnjelovo Gornje • Čađavica Donja • Čađavica Gornja • Čađavica Srednja • Čardačine • Čengić • Ćipirovine • Dazdarevo • Dragaljevac Donji • Dragaljevac Gornji • Dragaljevac Srednji • Dvorovi • Glavičice • Glavičorak • Glogovac • Gojsovac • Golo Brdo • Hase • Janja • Johovac • Kacevac • Kojčinovac • Kovanluk • Kriva Bara • Ljeljenča • Ljeskovac • Magnojević Donji • Magnojević Gornji • Magnojević Srednji • Međaši • Modran • Novo Naselje • Novo Selo • Obrijež • Ostojićevo • Patkovača • Piperci • Popovi • Dijelovi • Pučile • Ruhotina • Suho Polje • Triješnica • Trnjaci • Velika Obarska • Velino Selo • Vršani • Zagoni
