= Bukovica =

Bukovica may refer to:

== Croatia ==
- Bukovica, Dalmatia, a geographical region in Croatia
- Bukovica, Sisak-Moslavina County, a village near Topusko
- Bukovica, Brod-Posavina County, a village near Rešetari
- Nova Bukovica, a village and municipality in Virovitica–Podravina County
- Špišić Bukovica, a municipality in Virovitica–Podravina County

== Bosnia and Herzegovina ==
- Bukovica (Cazin), a village in the Municipality of Cazin
- Bukovica (Kiseljak), a village in the Municipality of Kiseljak
- Bukovica, Konjic, a village in the Municipality of Konjic
- Bukovica (Tomislavgrad), a village in the Municipality of Tomislavgrad
- Bukovica Donja, a village in the Municipality of Bijeljina
- Bukovica Gornja, a village in the Municipality of Bijeljina
- Bukovica Mala (Derventa), a village in the Municipality of Derventa
- Bukovica Mala (Doboj), a village in the Municipality of Doboj
- Bukovica Velika (Derventa), a village in the Municipality of Derventa
- Bukovica Velika (Doboj), a village in the Municipality of Doboj
- Donja Bukovica (Maglaj), a village in the Municipality of Maglaj
- Gornja Bukovica (Maglaj), a village in the Municipality of Maglaj
- Bukovica (Zenica), a village in the City of Zenica
- Bukovica (Trstionica), a river in the Municipality of Kakanj and Vareš, tributary of Trstionica
- Bukovica (Neretva), a river in the Municipality of Konjic, tributary of the Neretva

== Montenegro ==
- Bukovica, Pljevlja, a region in the north of the country
- Bukovica, Rožaje, a village in the Municipality of Rožaje
- Bukovica (Komarnica), a river in Šavnik

== Serbia ==
- Bukovica, Ivanjica, a town
- Bukovica, Kraljevo, a village
- Bukovica, Kruševac, a village

== Slovenia ==
- Bukovica, Ivančna Gorica, a village in the Municipality of Ivančna Gorica
- Bukovica, Renče–Vogrsko, a village in the Municipality of Renče–Vogrsko
- Bukovica, Ribnica, a small settlement in the Municipality of Ribnica
- Bukovica, Škofja Loka, a village in the Municipality of Škofja Loka
- Bukovica pri Litiji, a small settlement in the Municipality of Šmartno pri Litiji
- Bukovica pri Vodicah, a settlement in the Municipality of Vodice
- Mala Bukovica, a village in the Municipality of Ilirska Bistrica
- Velika Bukovica, a village in the Municipality of Ilirska Bistrica

== See also ==
- Bukowica
- Bukovina
- Donja Bukovica (disambiguation)
- Gornja Bukovica (disambiguation)
