= Donja Bukovica =

Donja Bukovica may refer to the following villages:

- Donja Bukovica (Maglaj), in the municipality of Maglaj, Bosna and Herzegovina
- Bukovica Donja, in the municipality of Bijeljina, Bosna and Herzegovina
- Donja Bukovica, Valjevo, in the municipality of Valjevo, Serbia
- Donja Bukovica, Montenegro, in the municipality of Šavnik, Montenegro
- Donja Bukovica, Croatia, in the municipality of Nova Bukovica, Croatia

== See also ==
- Gornja Bukovica (disambiguation)
