= Dašnica =

Dašnica may refer to:

- Dašnica, Bijeljina, a neighborhood of Bijeljina, Bosnia and Herzegovina
- Dašnica, Aleksandrovac, a village in Serbia
- Dašnica, Aleksinac, a village in Serbia
