= Gornja Bukovica =

Gornja Bukovica may refer to the following villages:

- Gornja Bukovica (Maglaj), in the municipality of Maglaj, Bosna and Herzegovina
- Bukovica Gornja, in the municipality of Bijeljina, Bosna and Herzegovina
- Gornja Bukovica, Valjevo, in the municipality of Valjevo, Serbia
- Gornja Bukovica, Montenegro, in the municipality of Šavnik, Montenegro

== See also ==
- Donja Bukovica (disambiguation)
