= Bukovica Mala =

Bukovica Mala may refer to:

- Bukovica Mala (Derventa), a village in Bosnia and Herzegovina
- Bukovica Mala (Doboj), a village in Bosnia and Herzegovina
