= Wilczyce =

Wilczyce may refer to the following places in Poland:

- Wilczyce, Legnica County in Lower Silesian Voivodeship (south-west Poland)
- Wilczyce, Wrocław County in Lower Silesian Voivodeship (south-west Poland)
- Wilczyce, Lesser Poland Voivodeship (south Poland)
- Wilczyce, Świętokrzyskie Voivodeship (south-central Poland)
- Wilczyce, Gmina Niegosławice in Lubusz Voivodeship (west Poland)
