= Karl Matzek =

Austrian religious artist (1890–1983)

Karl George Matzek ( 6 July 1895 – 16 April 1983) was an Austrian artist of Czech descent who is best noted for his panoramas of historic battles and murals of Biblical scenes in churches.

Matzek was a graduate of the Berlin Academy of Art. His artwork was shown in museums and at major galleries of Europe at his artistic height (in the 1930s). He was awarded various medals for his works, including a gold medal from the Russian tsar for his "Battle of Borodin".

Matzek fought in the Austrian-Hungarian cavalry in World War I, and was imprisoned in Siberia after the October Revolution. He was able to escape, and in the following years he managed to walk back to Europe, although details of this trek are largely unknown. On a winter day after World War II, he was found sick and half-frozen by villagers of Balatun in Bosnia. He remained in the town, supported by the townspeople in exchange for painting frescos in their churches. Matzek was placed in the most honorable home in the community, of a young widow with three children, the mother of the sculptor Slobodan Pejić. For almost ten years, Matzek educated the boy (he was the only father the boy ever knew; they became inseparable and painted frescos together, the boy painting the lower parts and Matzek painting the upper areas), and eventually married the mother.

In Harkanovci there is the parish church of Our Lady, built in 1799, restored and expanded in 1938. The entire interior was painted with frescoes and stained glass was created for the windows. The frescoes were painted by Karl Matzek in the period from 1955 to 1957. His frescos decorate also churches/monasteries in Janja, in Dragaljevac, in Bijeljina and elsewhere. Earlier Matzek had been sentenced to death by communist authorities, but in Bosnia he was saved by the influence of the parish priest don Mirko Gazivode. In return he painted two murals in the church. Parishioners liked them and then ordered all other frescoes in the church.

Matzek migrated to Perth, Western Australia, in 1958. There he painted the Stations of the Cross, a series of 14 pictures, in the "Como Catholic Church" and in 1961 a series of murals for the Church of Sts. Peter and Paul at the Redemptorist Monastery, North Perth. Matzek later moved to Canberra, where a sizeable Serbian immigrant population had accumulated beginning in 1949. The Serbs built St George Serbian Orthodox Church in 1966, after the Government granted them a block of land at the National Circuit, Forrest, close to Parliament House. In the following year, Matzek, then 77, was commissioned to decorate the interior of the church, and for the next 16 years, until his death in 1983, he devoted himself to painting the side walls, ceiling and altar screen, depicting episodes in Serbian history as well as Biblical scenes. Even though the Church itself is small in size, Matzek's two 20-metre-long panoramas and murals have attracted visitors daily from all parts of Australia and overseas. Times had been rough for many years after his arrival to Australia, but Matzek had hoped that his family could join him there eventually. Since he had moved to Australia and until his death, due to difficulties and expenses involved in global communication in those times, Matzek remained only in written contact with the family in Bosnia, hoping for a long time that they could join him. He sent art books and art journals to Pejić, and supported his family financially as much as possible.

Later in his life, during his continued work with the Church, Matzek converted to the Orthodox faith as "George". Following a brief illness, Matzek died on 16 April 1983, and was buried at the St. Sava Monastery Cemetery in Canberra.
