= Bukovica Velika =

Bukovica Velika may refer to:

- Bukovica Velika (Derventa), a village in Bosnia and Herzegovina
- Bukovica Velika (Doboj), a village in Bosnia and Herzegovina
