= Crnjelovo =

Crnjelovo may refer to:

- Crnjelovo Donje, a village in the city of Bijeljina
- Crnjelovo Gornje, a village in the city of Bijeljina
