= Przecław (disambiguation) =

Przecław is a town in south-east Poland.

Przecław may also refer to the following villages:

- Przecław, Słupca County in Greater Poland Voivodeship (west-central Poland)
- Przecław, Szamotuły County in Greater Poland Voivodeship (west-central Poland)
- Przecław, Łódź Voivodeship (central Poland)
- Przecław, Lubusz Voivodeship (west Poland)
- Przecław, West Pomeranian Voivodeship (north-west Poland)
