= Jurzyn =

Jurzyn may refer to the following places:

- Jurzyn, Żagań County in Lubusz Voivodeship (west Poland)
- Jurzyn, Żary County in Lubusz Voivodeship (west Poland)
- Jurzyn, Masovian Voivodeship (east-central Poland)
