= Gościeszowice =

- Village
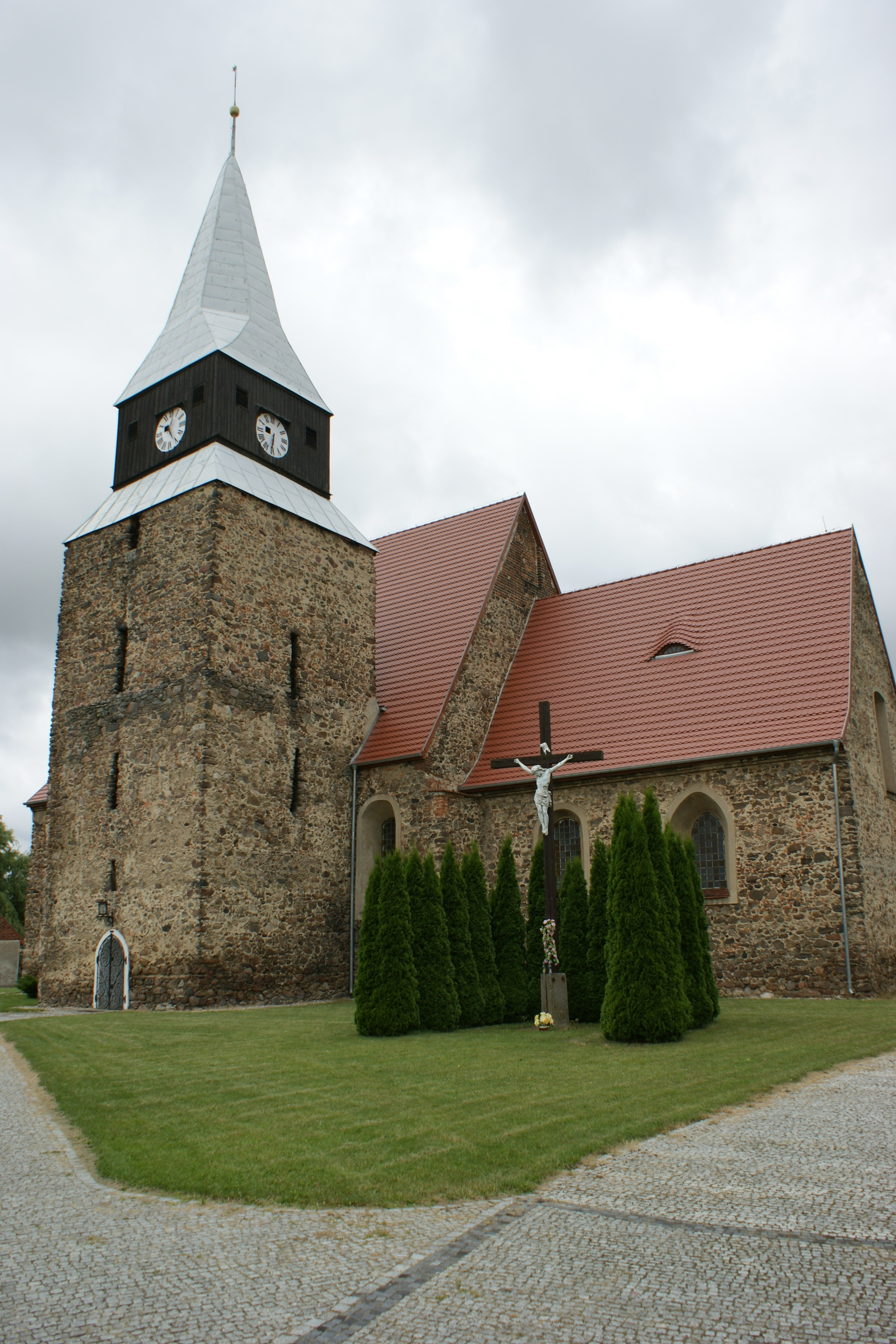

- Location within Poland
- Coordinates: 51°36′N 15°40′E
- Country: Poland
- Voivodeship: Lubusz
- County: Żagań
- Gmina: Niegosławice

Gościeszowice (Polish: [ɡɔɕt͡ɕɛʂɔˈvit͡sɛ]) is a village in the administrative district of Gmina Niegosławice, within Żagań County, Lubusz Voivodeship, in western Poland.
