= Międzylesie, Żagań County =

Międzylesie
- Village
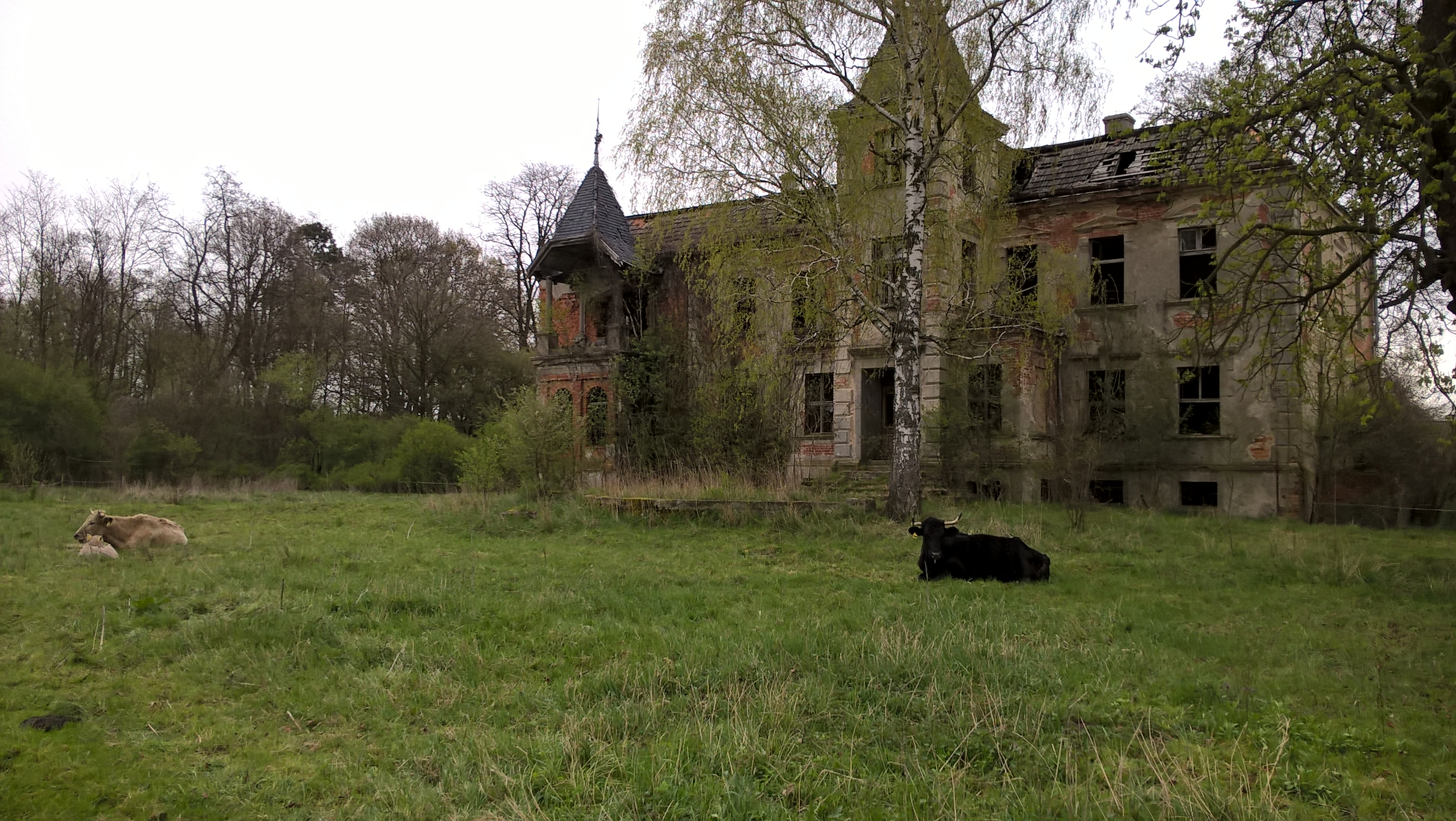

- Location within Poland
- Coordinates: 51°37′21″N 15°38′1″E
- Country: Poland
- Voivodeship: Lubusz
- County: Żagań
- Gmina: Niegosławice

Międzylesie [mjɛnd͡zɨˈlɛɕɛ] is a village in the administrative district of Gmina Niegosławice, within Żagań County, Lubusz Voivodeship, in western Poland.
