= Kojčinovac =

Kojčinovac Којчиновац (Serbian)
- Village
- Location within Bosnia and Herzegovina
- Coordinates: 44°41′32.6″N 19°13′42.8″E
- Country: Bosnia and Herzegovina
- Entity: Republika Srpska
- City: Bijeljina

Population (1991)
  - Total: 726
- Time zone: UTC+1 (CET)
  - Summer (DST): UTC+2 (CEST)

Kojčinovac (Serbian Cyrillic: Којчиновац) is a village located south of the city of Bijeljina in Republika Srpska, Bosnia and Herzegovina. To the west of Kojčinovac is Modran.

== Industry ==
The main company in Gornji Kojčinovac is STECO CENTAR.

== Sport ==
The main football club is FK Polet Gornji Kojčinovac.
