= Nowy Dwór, Żagań County =

Nowy Dwór
- Village
- Location within Poland
- Coordinates: 51°37′06″N 15°48′08″E
- Country: Poland
- Voivodeship: Lubusz
- County: Żagań
- Gmina: Niegosławice

Nowy Dwór [ˈnɔvɨ ˈdvur] is a village in the administrative district of Gmina Niegosławice, within Żagań County, Lubusz Voivodeship, in western Poland.
