= Gmina Niegosławice =

Gmina Niegosławice Niegosławice Commune
- Gmina
- Coat of arms
- Interactive map of Gmina Niegosławice
- Coordinates (Niegosławice): 51°35′17″N 15°42′47″E
- Country: Poland
- Voivodeship: Lubusz
- County: Żagań
- Seat: Niegosławice

Area
  - Total: 136.11 km^{2} (52.55 sq mi)

Population (2019-06-30)
  - Total: 4,413
  - Density: 32.42/km^{2} (83.97/sq mi)
- Website: http://www.niegoslawice.pl

Gmina Niegosławice is a rural gmina (administrative district) in Żagań County, Lubusz Voivodeship, in western Poland. Its seat is the village of Niegosławice, which lies approximately 28 kilometres (17 mi) east of Żagań and 42 km (26 mi) south of Zielona Góra.

The gmina covers an area of 136.11 square kilometres (52.6 sq mi), and as of 2019 its total population is 4,413.

== Villages ==
Gmina Niegosławice contains the villages and settlements of Bukowica, Bukowiczka, Dworcowy, Gościeszowice, Jurzyn, Krzywczyce, Międzylesie, Mycielin, Niegosławice, Nowa Bukowica, Nowa Jabłona, Nowy Dwór, Przecław, Pustkowie, Rudziny, Stara Jabłona, Sucha Dolna, Wilczyce, Zagóra and Zimna Brzeźnica.

== Neighbouring gminas ==
Gmina Niegosławice is bordered by the gminas of Bytom Odrzański, Gaworzyce, Nowe Miasteczko, Przemków, Szprotawa and Żukowice.
