= Krzywczyce =

- Village
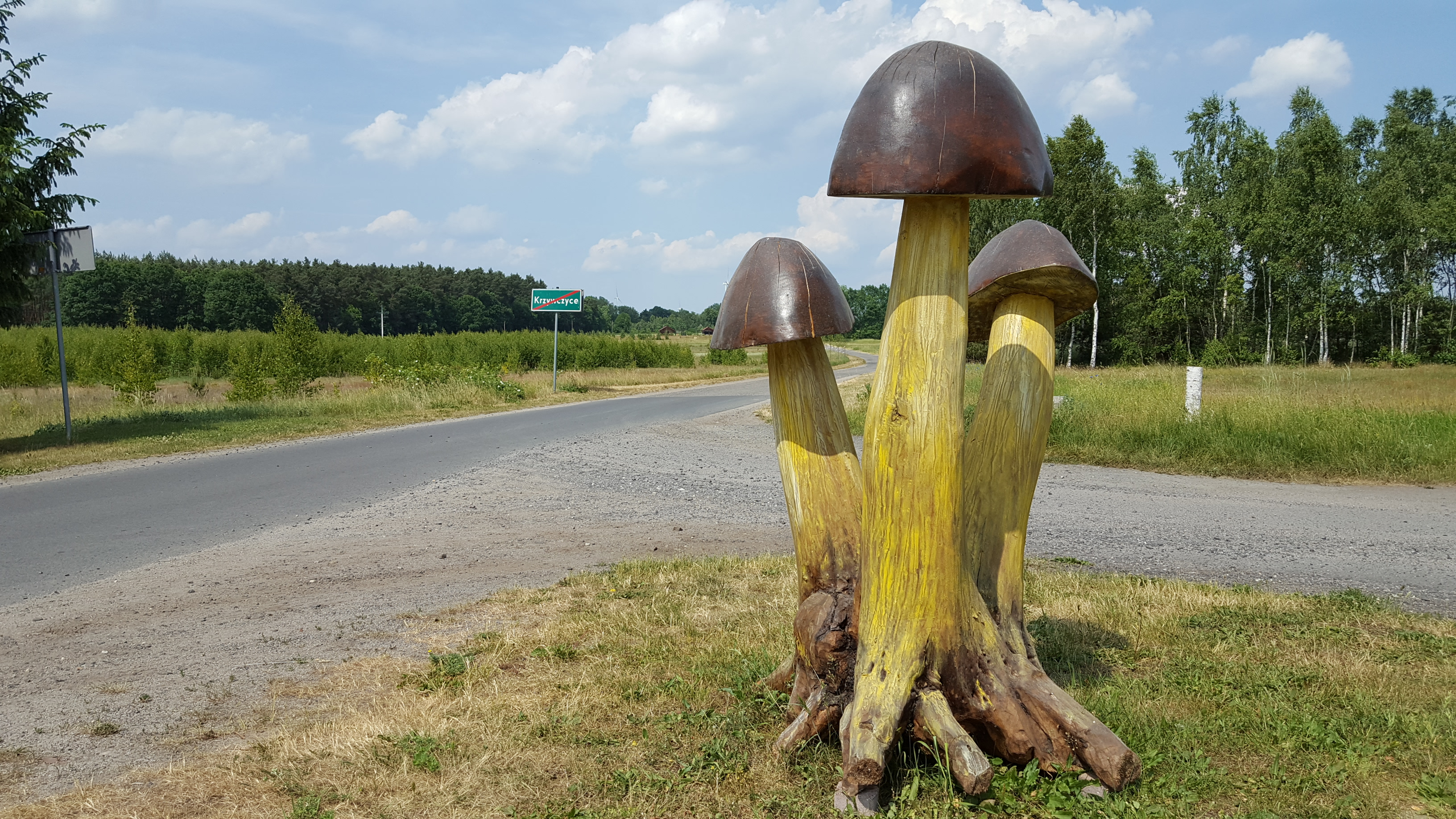

- Location within Poland
- Coordinates: 51°33′N 15°39′E
- Country: Poland
- Voivodeship: Lubusz
- County: Żagań
- Gmina: Niegosławice

Krzywczyce [kʂɨfˈt͡ʂɨt͡sɛ] (German: Eckartswaldau) is a village in the administrative district of Gmina Niegosławice, within Żagań County, Lubusz Voivodeship, in western Poland.
