= Vrtojba =

- Location in Slovenia
- Coordinates: 45°54′32.12″N 13°38′11.02″E
- Country: Slovenia
- Traditional region: Littoral
- Statistical region: Gorizia
- Municipality: Šempeter–Vrtojba
- Elevation: 60.9 m (200 ft)

Population (2002)
  - Total: 2,404

Vrtojba (pronounced [ʋəɾˈtoːi̯ba]; Italian: Vertoiba) is a settlement in the Municipality of Šempeter–Vrtojba in the Slovene Littoral region of Slovenia. A border crossing into Italy is located here. On the Italian side of the border, opposite Vrtojba, is the suburb of San Andrea (Slovene: Štandrež), now part of the town of Gorizia (Slovene: Gorica).

== Name ==
Vrtojba was first mentioned in the early 13th century as Toyfa, Toyua, or Tojva in a list of properties belonging to the Counts of Gorizia. Its etymology is unknown, but is likely of pre-Slavic origin. By 1350 it was listed as Vertoib.

== History ==
The population increased in the 16th and 17th centuries with settlers from areas further south affected by Ottoman raids moving to the fertile countryside around Gorizia.

In the late 18th and early 19th centuries, Vrtojba became known for its early season vegetables and potatoes with regular supply to the markets of Gorizia and beyond. Although this fame still continues to some extent today, industrialization of Nova Gorica after the Second World War meant workers also settled in the village and the urban expansion in recent decades has virtually turned Vrtojba into the southern suburbs of Nova Gorica.

== Cemetery ==
First World War cemetery

The village has a World War I military cemetery, with the remains of the Austro-Hungarian soldiers that fought on this section of the front during the Battles of the Isonzo. The cemetery is most easily accessed from neighboring Bukovica. The soldiers buried in Vrtojba fought in the 24th Infantry Regiment (K. u. K. Infanterieregiment "Ritter von Kummer" No. 24) from Kolomyia, then known as Kolomea, in present-day Ukraine. In 1974, most of the crosses on the graves still bore the names of the deceased.
