= Ida Cadorin Barbarigo =

Italian painter (1920–2018)

- Born: Ida Cadorin; August 26, 1920; Venice, Italy
- Died: January 15, 2018 (aged 97); Venice, Italy
- Known for: painter
- Movement: Abstract Expressionism

Ida Cadorin Barbarigo was an Italian painter. She was born on August 26, 1920, (Note: Barbarigo's year of birth is stated differently in various sources: 1920: Inscription on her gravestone; non-profit association "Barbarigo Cadorin Music Archive"; Ocula's Ida Barbarigo Biography; Axel Vervoordt Gallery "Ida Barbarigo"; My Art Guide Venice exhibition "Ida Barbarigo: Herms and Saturns"; 1925: RKD Netherlands Institute for art history; Estorick Collection of Modern Italian Art, Exhibition "Double Portrait: Ida Barbarigo and Zoran Music"; Fortuny Museum, Exhibition "IDA BARBARIGO - Terrestrials"; My Art Guide Venice "Venetian Artist Ida Barbarigo Dies at 92"; Catalog of the exhibition Action, Gesture, Paint: Women Artists and Global Abstraction 1940-1970.; The discrepancy is because she claimed a later birth year in order to present herself as younger.) in Venice, Italy. She attended the Accademia di Belle Arti di Venezia. In 1942 one of her paintings was included in the Venice Biennale. She exhibited her work continuously until her final solo show at Galleria Contini in 2004. She was included in thirteen annual Salon de Mai exhibitions from 1955 through 1980.

In 1949 she married the fellow artist Zoran Mušič (1909–2005). The couple settled in Paris in 1952. By the 1970s Barbarigo lived in Paris and Venice. She died on January 15, 2018, in Venice.

Her work is in the collection of the Tate. In 2023 her work was included in the exhibition Action, Gesture, Paint: Women Artists and Global Abstraction 1940–1970 at the Whitechapel Gallery in London.
