= Nowa Bukowica =

- Village
- Location within Poland
- Coordinates: 51°39′00″N 15°44′46″E
- Country: Poland
- Voivodeship: Lubusz
- County: Żagań
- Gmina: Niegosławice

Nowa Bukowica [ˈnɔva bukɔˈvit͡sa] is a village in the administrative district of Gmina Niegosławice, within Żagań County, Lubusz Voivodeship, in western Poland.
