= Zimna Brzeźnica =

- Village
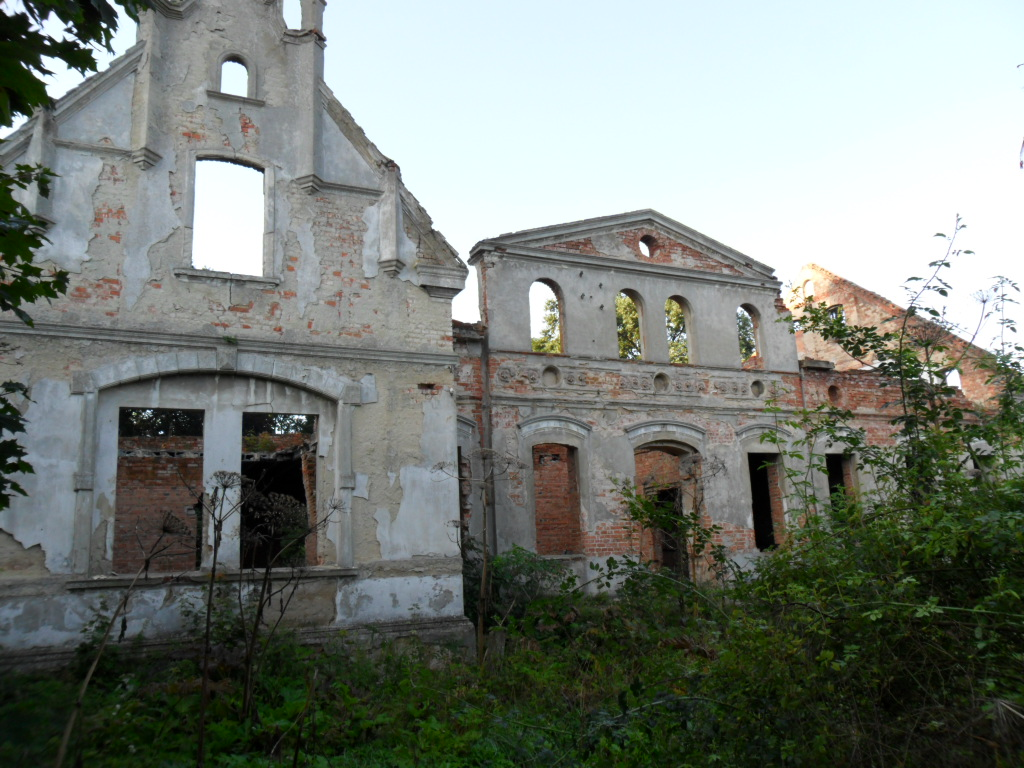

- Location within Poland
- Coordinates: 51°39′N 15°49′E
- Country: Poland
- Voivodeship: Lubusz
- County: Żagań
- Gmina: Niegosławice

Zimna Brzeźnica [ˈʑimna bʐɛʑˈnit͡sa] is a village in the administrative district of Gmina Niegosławice, within Żagań County, Lubusz Voivodeship, in western Poland.
