= Rudziny, Lubusz Voivodeship =

Rudziny
- Village
- Location within Poland
- Coordinates: 51°34′N 15°43′E
- Country: Poland
- Voivodeship: Lubusz
- County: Żagań
- Gmina: Niegosławice

Rudziny [ruˈd͡ʑinɨ] is a village in the administrative district of Gmina Niegosławice, within Żagań County, Lubusz Voivodeship, in western Poland.
