= Zoran Mušič =

Slovenian painter and engraver (1909–2005)

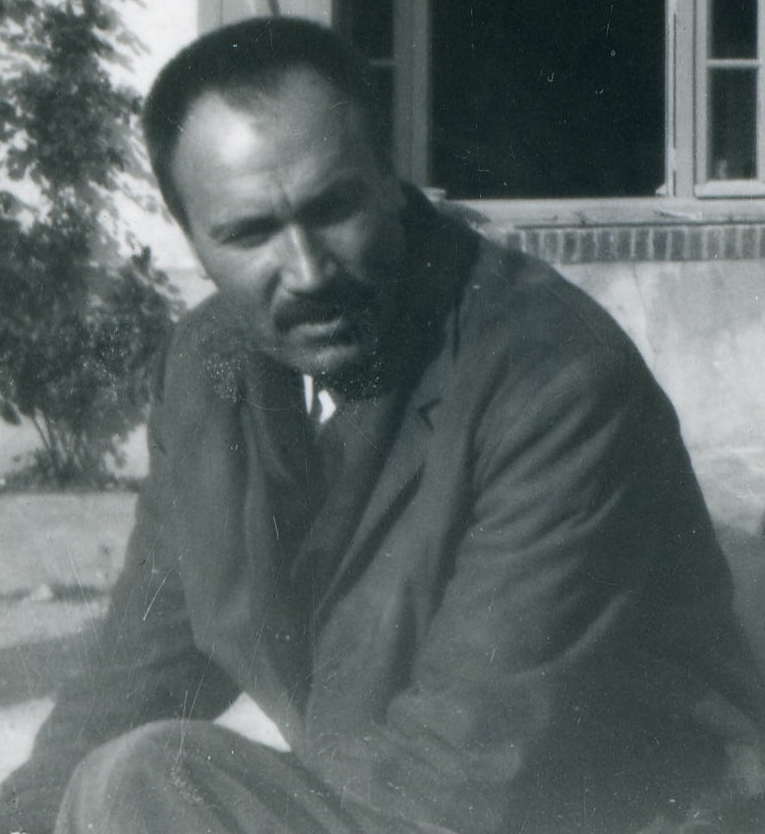
- Zoran Mušič in the 1960s
- Born: Anton Zoran Musič; 12 February 1909; Bukovica, Austria-Hungary (now in Slovenia)
- Died: 25 May 2005 (aged 96); Venice, Italy
- Education: Academy of Fine Arts Zagreb
- Known for: Painting; drawing; printmaking
- Notable work: Dachau; Konjički (Cavallini); Dalmatian landscape; Sienese hills; Carst landscape (Kraške krajine); Umbrian (Umbrijske krajine); Istrian; Dolomiti; Landscape; Nismo poslednji (We are not the last); Rastlinski motivi (Vegetable motivs); Cathedrals; Portraits of Ida; Double portraits; Self-portraits
- Movement: Neodvisni; École de Paris
- Spouse: Ida Cadorin Barbarigo
- Awards: Grand Prize Venice Biennale (1956); Prešeren Award (1991)

Self-portrait (1997)

Zoran Mušič (12 February 1909 – 25 May 2005), baptised as Anton Zoran Musič, was a Slovene painter, printmaker, and draughtsman. He was the only painter of Slovene descent who managed to establish himself in the elite cultural circles of Italy and France, particularly Paris in the second half of the 20th century, where he lived for most of his later life. He painted landscapes, still lifes, portraits, and self-portraits, as well as scenes of horror from the Dachau concentration camp and vedute of Venice.

== Life ==
=== Early life and education ===
Zoran Mušič was born in a Slovene-speaking family in Bukovica, a small village in the lower Vipava Valley near Gorizia, in what was then the Austrian County of Gorizia and Gradisca (now in Slovenia). Mušič's father Anton was the headmaster of the local school, and his mother Marija (née Blažič) was a teacher there. Both parents were Slovenes from the Gorizia region: his father was from the village of Šmartno in the Gorizia Hills, and his mother was born in the hamlet of Kostanjevica in the village of Lig.

Mušič's father was mobilized in 1914 and served on various battlefields during the First World War. In 1915, during the Battles of the Isonzo, the family (mother with two children) was forced to flee to Arnače, a village near Velenje in the Duchy of Styria, where Zoran attended elementary school. In the spring of 1918, toward the end of World War I, the family moved back to Gorizia, but they were expelled again in late August 1919 by the Italian authorities, which had occupied the region. They moved to Grebinj Griffen in Carinthia, but were expelled once again by the Austrian authorities after the Carinthian Plebiscite in late October 1920. They finally settled in Lower Styria, then part of the Kingdom of Serbs, Croats and Slovenes.

Mušič attended two high schools in Maribor until September 1928. Afterward, he visited Vienna for a short time. Between 1930 and 1935, he continued his studies at the Academy of Fine Arts in Zagreb. Mušič spoke Slovene, German, Croatian, Italian, French, and some Spanish, English Friulian.

=== Career ===
After graduating in 1934, he travelled extensively around Europe. He spent three months (April to June 1935) in Spain, mainly Madrid. He served his obligatory army service in Bileća (November 1935 to July 1936) in Yugoslavia. Later he spent each summer in Dalmatia and painted there. He lived, painted and exhibited in Maribor and the nearby village of Hoče. In 1940, he moved to Ljubljana permanently. During this period (1942), he painted in two churches in his native Gorizia region, together with his friend, the painter Avgust Černigoj (in Drežnica and Grahovo) and later added Way of the Cross one in the village of Gradno where another Slovenian painter, Lojze Spacal painted the walls (Church of St. George). In October 1943, he moved to Trieste and for some weeks for the first time to Venice. He had his first one-man show (outside Yugoslavia) in Trieste in 1944 and several months later in Venice. In early October 1944, he was arrested by the Nazi German forces because he was in a group of Slovene anti-fascists. The group had a hidden transmitter and was connected with the British IS. His drawing and painting in Venice raised suspicions that he was a spy, and a month later he was sent to the Dachau concentration camp, where he made more than 180 sketches of life in the camp, some under extremely difficult circumstances. From the drawings, mainly created in May 1945, he managed to save around one hundred (some more with his friends).

After liberation by the Americans on April 29, 1945, Mušič returned to his hometown of Ljubljana in early June. There, he was sent to the hospital in Golnik. A month later he was subjected to pressures by the newly established communist regime and moved to Gorizia at the end of July 1945. In the following months he travelled in the Trieste and Istria area, spending some time in Pinguente (Buzet). In October 1945, he settled in Venice with the help of the Cadorin family and returned to painting. In September 1949, he married the Venetian painter Ida Cadorin Barbarigo there. He also painted a room in Vila Dornacher near Zurich during the same period. He exhibited extensively in Rome, more than in Venice.

He prepared a huge tapestry,'Marco Polo on his way to China' for the passenger ship Augustus in 1950–51. At the same time he won the Gualino prize and in 1956 the Grand Prize for his printmaking at the Venice Biennale. In 1951 he was awarded the Prix de Paris in Cortina (jointly with the painter Antonio Corpora) for his colorful paintings of Dalmatia. After 1952 he lived mainly in Paris, where the 'lyrical abstraction' of the French Informel determined the art world. He was a part of the third Ecole de Paris and exhibited at the Galerie de France. During this period he kept his studio in Venice and exhibited again at the Biennale in 1960, when he was awarded the UNESCO Prize. The much acclaimed series We Are Not the Last, in which the artist transformed the terror of his experiences in the concentration camp into documents of universal tragedy, was made in the 1970s. His last achievement was a series of Selfportratis and Double portraits. He had problems with his eyesight in his old age. Partly blind, he signed his last drawings in 2000.

In 1981 Mušič was appointed Commandeur des Arts et des Lettres in Paris. Mušič's work has been honoured in numerous international exhibitions, such as the large retrospective exhibition at the Grand Palais in Paris in April 1995, opened by the French and Slovenian presidents François Mitterrand and Milan Kučan. At the same time Austrians promised him a permanent exhibition in Klagenfurt. It was never established. A huge part of his works were taken from his studio and never returned, to the painter or his wife.

In 1991, a collection of 134 graphic works donated by Zoran Mušič was opened at Dobrovo Castle in Brda. It was curated by Nelida Silič Nemec, director of the Museum (Slovene: Goriški muzej) in Nova Gorica. A catalog was published with a list of the donated works, a standard biography and three introductory studies by N. S. Nemec (The Collection of Graphic Works by Zoran Mušič), Nace Šumi (Zoran Mušič in Slovenian Painting), and Zoran Kržišnik (The Graphic Creativity of Zoran Mušič). In 1991, Mušič received the Prešeren Award for lifetime achievement, the highest recognition in the arts in Slovenia. Some of Mušič's works have been featured at Piran Coastal Galleries. Gallery Zala from Ljubljana prepared seven exhibitions (four in Ljubljana, and one each in Belgrade, Vienna, and London). A large, important retrospective was presented at the Modern Gallery in Ljubljana in November 2009. Curator was Breda Ilich Klančnik. The Slovene Academy of Sciences and Arts published a volume written by 20 authors experts from Slovenia, Croatia, Austria, Italy, and France (Vizije Zorana Mušiča) in November 2012. The only permanent exhibition of his various works (paintings, prints, and drawings) was opened at the National Gallery in Ljubljana in 2016. Jean Clair, Vanda Mušič and Gojko Zupan wrote a catalogue for the permanent exhibition. Presentation was refreshed several times. A large temporary exhibition of selected works was prepared at Lugano's Collezione Braglia in October 2016. Another exhibition took place in Venice at the Fortuny Museum in spring 2018: A Tribute to Zoran Mušič, The Zurich Room. The Leopold Museum in Vienna opened a large retrospective exhibition in April 2018 with 167 selected works. A large exhibition was opened in Gorizia in May 2025. They published an excellent catalogue with texts of Daniela Ferretti, Gojko Zupan, Paola and Monique Cadorin, Marcella Ciarnelli, Diego Bianchi, Jean Clair an Michael Peppiatt.

The first doctoral thesis related directly to Mušič was prepared by Aurora Fonda at the University of Padua: L'opera giovanile di Zoran Music, Padova, 2011, which dealt with the painter's early oeuvre, with a detailed inventory of his works till 1945. Subsequent studies about periods of Music's work were written by Miklavž Komelj, Asta Vrečko, Daniele d'Anza, Dolores del Giudice, Marko Jenko and others. Mušič's painting and Merleau-Ponty's philosophy of painting were brought together in a PhD in 2016 by Nelida Nemec. She juxtaposed philosophical views on painting and the perception of the philosopher with the artistic practice and some views of the painter. They both share the similar problem. This study was followed by a French, extensive and more detailed doctorate by French Etienne David. It deals with the key works of the Slovenian painter in Dachau and after Dachau (We are not the last) and compares his oeuvre with that of Jean Fautrier. David added large and very useful documentation. Interesting study was written by Pierre Bernard Nouraud. He teaches at the University of Aix-Marseille and researches the connections between the memory of Auschwitz and other camps and contemporary art in several books.

Mušič died in Venice in 2005 at the age of 96. He is buried in the local St. Michele cemetery.

== Exhibitions (selection of personal presentations) ==
- 1942: Zoran Mušič. Galerija Obersnel, Ljubljana, (February)
- 1944: Zoran Music. 25 oeuvres exposées. Piccola Galleria, Venice (June 17 – July 8) - With catalogue
- 1960: Music. Peintures et gouaches. Galerie_de_France, Paris (February 26 – March 20)
- 1964: Music. Zeichnungen und Graphik. Kunstmuseum Basel (May 9 – June 14)
- 1967: Zoran Anton Music. Retrospektivna razstava. Moderna Galerija, Ljubljana (April 14 – May 7)
- 1978: Music, le temps d'une mémoire. Rétrospective: Toiles – Aquarelles – Gouaches – Dessins de 1951 à 1977. Galerie de France, Paris (April 4 – May 20)
- 1991: Collection of graphic works by Zoran. Gallery of Zoran Music. Dobrovo Castle. Slovenia.
- 1992–93: Music, Arbeiten auf Papier von 1945 bis 1992. Graphische Sammlung Albertina, Vienna (November 25 – January 31)
- 1995: Zoran Music. Galeries nationales du Grand Palais, Paris (April 4 – July 3)
- 1995: Zoran Music. Nous ne sommes pas les derniers, Peintures, Dessins, Gravures. Musée des Beaux-Arts de Caen, Caen (May 18 – August 16)
- 1995–96: Zoran Music: Die späten Jahre. Bayerische Akademie der Schönen Künste, Munich (November 24 – January 14)
- 1997: Zoran Music. Schirn Kunsthalle Frankfurt, Frankfurt Main (April 24 – June 29)
- 1997: Zoran Music. MMG Gallery, Tokyo (August)
- 1998: Zoran Music: gli acquerelli veneziani 1947–1949. Museo Morandi – Instituzione Galleria d'Arte Moderna, Bologna (January 22 – April 13)
- 2006: Music in Slovene private Collections (1935–1997). Galerija Zala, Ljubljana (November 24 – December 22)
- 2009: A Spanish vision, February. National Gallery of Slovenia, Ljubljana (12. February – March)
- 2009: Zoran Mušič in private and public collections, November 2009 – February 2010. Modern Gallery of Slovenia, Ljubljana
- 2009: Zoran Mušič v slovenskih zasebnih zbirkah III. Galerija Zala, Ljubljana (February)
- 2016: Zoran Mušič, Permanent collection. National Gallery of Slovenia, Ljubljana
- 2018: Omaggio a Zoran Music. La Stanza di Zurigo. Museo Fortuny, Venezia (Febbraio)
- 2018: Zoran Music. Poesie der Stille. Leopold Museum, Vienna (April 13 – August 6)
- 2019: Zoran Music. Gallery W&K – Wienerroihter & Kohlbacher, Vienna (May 22 – September 13)
- 2019: Music in Slovene private Collections VII. Galerija Zala, Ljubljana (June 6 – June 25)
- 2019: Zoran Mušič. Galerija in antikvitete Novak, Ljubljana (October 24 – November 9)
- 2020: Zoran Mušič. "The fascination of painting". Klagenfurt, (January 23 – March 1)
- 2020: Zoran Mušič. "111 catalogues for the 111 Anniversary". National Gallery, Ljubljana. (February 11 – May 30)
- 2020: Zoran Mušič. "Drawings from Dachau," Modern Gallery, Ljubljana. (February 27 – July 1)
- 2022: Zoran Mušič. Il viaggio della vita, Galleria Comunale, Monfalcone. (8 Ottobre – 27 Novembre)
- 2022: Zoran Mušič. La Stanza di Zurigo, Chur, Kunstmuseum Bündner
- 2025: Zoran Mušič. Nove pridobitve, Galerija Novak, Ljubljana (February 12)
- 2025: Zoran Mušič. Pokrajina teles, Dobrovo (May 15 - September 5)
- 2025: Zoran Mušič. LA STANZA DI ZURIGO, L'ATELIER, LE OPERE, Gorizia / Gorica, (May 25 - 2 November)

== Museums and galleries ==
Austria

- Albertina, Vienna
- Essl Museum – Contemporary Art, Klosterneuburg/Vienna
- StadtGalerie, Klagenfurt, Klagenfurt
- Gallery Magnet, Völkermarkt/Carinthia

Chile

- Museo de la Solidaridad Salvador Allende, Santiago de Chile

Croatia

- Galerija Moderne umjetnosti, Zagreb
- Muzej moderne i sodobne umjetnosti, Rijeka

France

- Musée des Beaux-Arts, Caen
- Musée National d'Art Moderne, Paris
- Musée National du Louvre, Paris, prints
- Centre National Georges Pompidou, Paris, 10 drawings from Dachau
- Musée Malraux, Le Havre
- Musée de Valence, Valence
- Musée des Beaux-Arts, Dijon

Germany

- Museum Abteiberg, Mönchengladbach
- Museum Folkwang, Essen
- Neue Pinakothek, München

Italy

- Galleria d'Arte Moderna, Bologna
- Galleria internazionale d'Arte Moderna Ca' Pesaro, Venice
- Museo Fortuny, Venice
- MUCA Museum, Monfalcone, tapestry from Galleria Nazionale, Rome
- GaMeC galleria, Bergamo, painting
- Musei Provinciali di Gorizia, Gorizia, paintings
- Museo Morandi, Bologna
- Musei Civici, Treviso
- Museo Revoltella, Trieste, 24 drawings from Dachau
- MAGI '900- Museum of Artistic and Historical Excellence, Pieve di Cento (BO)

Israel

- Yad Vashem museum, Jerusalem

Netherlands

- Stedelijk Museum, Amsterdam

Slovenia

- Nova Gorica Regional Museum / Castle Kromberk, Zoran Mušič Gallery, Dobrovo, exhibition: prints
- Veno Pilon Gallery, Ajdovščina: drawings, painting
- City Museum of Ljubljana, Ljubljana, paintings
- Museum of Modern Art, Ljubljana, drawings, prints, paintings
- Museum of Contemporary History, Ljubljana, print
- National Gallery of Slovenia, Ljubljana, permanent exhibition: paintings, sketches, prints
- Maribor Art Gallery, Maribor, paintings, prints
- Museum of White Carniola (Bela krajina), Kambič Collection, Metlika, part of the permanent exhibition in the Kambič Gallery; paintings, prints, drawings
- Carinthia Art History Gallery, Slovenj Gradec

Spain

- Museo Thyssen-Bornemisza, Madrid
- Collecio IVAM, Valencia

Sweden

- Museum, Stockholm

Switzerland

- Kunstmuseum, Basel
- Fondazione Braglia, Lugano
- Musée Jenisch, Vevey

United Kingdom

- Estorick Collection, London
- Tate Modern, London

United States

- Art Institute of Chicago
- Carnegie Museum of Art, Pittsburgh
- Cleveland Museum of Art
- Dallas Museum of Art
- Fine Arts Museums of San Francisco
- List Visual Arts Center, Massachusetts Institute of Technology, Cambridge, Mass.
- Metropolitan Museum of Art, New York
- Museum of Modern Art, New York
- Philadelphia Museum of Art, Philadelphia

Vatican

- Vatican Museums, Collection of Contemporary Art
