= Niegosławice, Lubusz Voivodeship =

Niegosławice
- Village
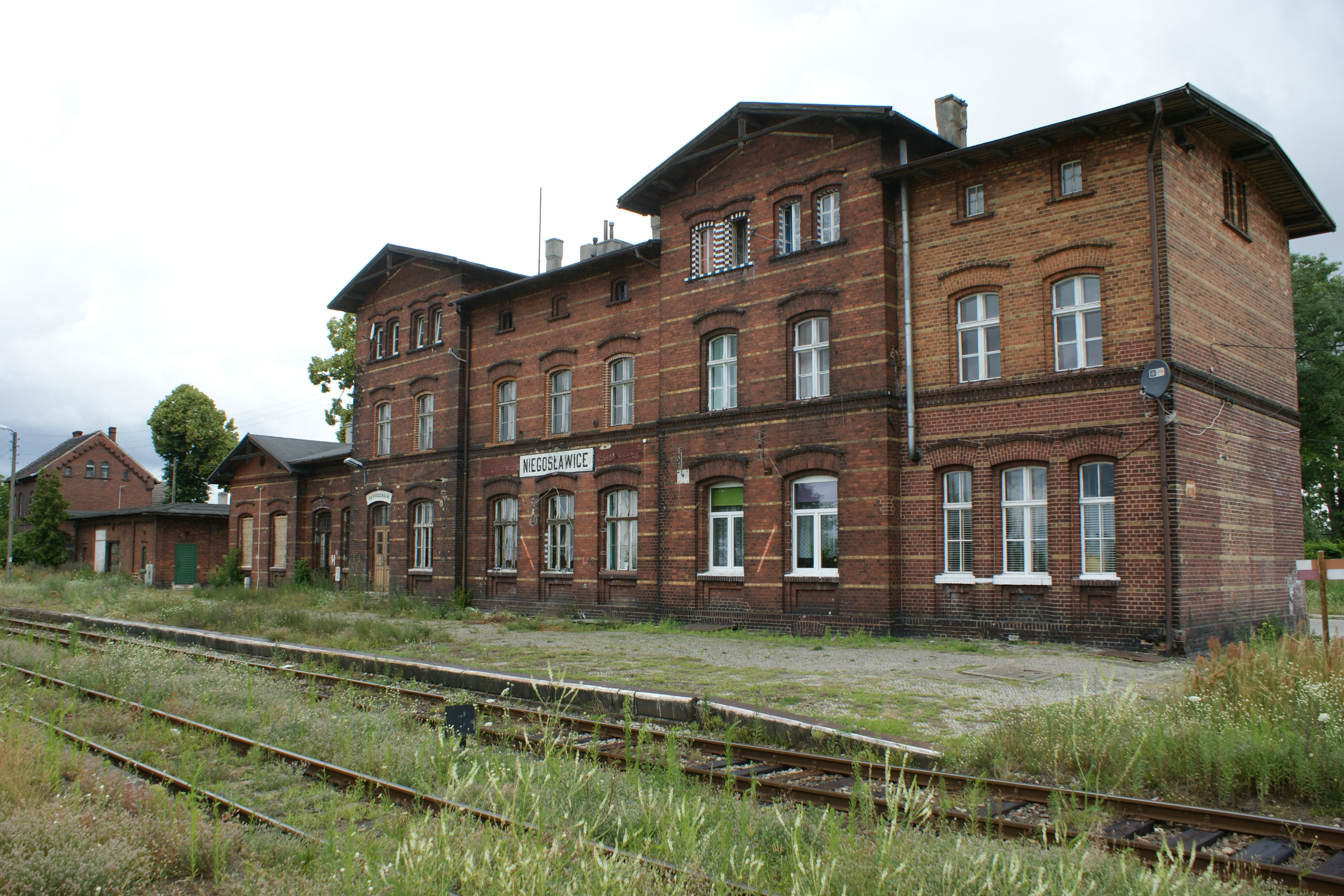
- Train station

- Location within Poland
- Coordinates: 51°35′17″N 15°42′47″E
- Country: Poland
- Voivodeship: Lubusz
- County: Żagań
- Gmina: Niegosławice

Population
  - Total: 930

Niegosławice [ɲɛɡɔswaˈvit͡sɛ]) is a village in Żagań County, Lubusz Voivodeship, in western Poland. It is the seat of the gmina (administrative district) called Gmina Niegosławice.

== Notable residents ==
- Günter Blobel (1936–2018), Nobel Prize-winning German biologist
