= Dworcowy =

- Village
- Location within Poland
- Coordinates: 51°36′04″N 15°42′08″E
- Country: Poland
- Voivodeship: Lubusz
- County: Żagań
- Gmina: Niegosławice

Dworcowy [dvɔrˈt͡sɔvɨ] is a village in the administrative district of Gmina Niegosławice, within Żagań County, Lubusz Voivodeship, in western Poland.

The village has a famous bridge, originally wooden, which was built between 1853 and 1854, opening on 1 November 1854, near the newly formed main railway station.
