= Zagóra, Lubusz Voivodeship =

Zagóra
- Village
- Location within Poland
- Coordinates: 51°40′08″N 15°45′02″E
- Country: Poland
- Voivodeship: Lubusz
- County: Żagań
- Gmina: Niegosławice

Zagóra [zaˈɡura] is a village in the administrative district of Gmina Niegosławice, within Żagań County, Lubusz Voivodeship, in western Poland.
