= Slobodan Pejić =

Slobodan Pejić (19 June 1944 – 25 August 2006) was a Bosnian sculptor and painter who lived for most of his life in Slovenia. He is best known after having transformed a 300-year-old oak tree that fell in the storm in Tivoli Park in Ljubljana into the sculpture Coexistence in 2000, proposing with the act the beginning of a sculpture garden (forma viva) in the park. He painted numerous frescos in Bosnia and Croatia. In addition, he invented a new technique in sculpture, based on moulding and gas expansion. He was for many years the Ljubljana correspondent of the Tanjug press agency.

== Life ==
Pejić was born during a bomb raid of German forces in World War II, on a field, in Balatun, located north of Bijeljina in what is now Republika Srpska. His father was a well-known architect, and his mother was a daughter of Bosnian worthies. As a boy, Pejić was educated by the Austrian painter Karl Matzek, with whom he studied for almost ten years, and who was the only father Pejić really knew. Matzek also married his mother, but then moved to Australia in 1958 and the family retained only written contacts, including art books and art magazines regularly sent by Matzek to Pejić. Apart from Matzek, the young boy was most influenced by the Drina River, where he was spending his youth. He was also marked by the works of the Bosnian poet Mak Dizdar, and some of Dizdar's verses became his life motto. In his home village, Pejić was ascribed magical powers, and helped people as a healer.

Immediately after having graduated from high school, Pejić moved to his own. He studied in Belgrade and earned his living as a clarinetist in a jazz band and as a scenographer in the National Theatre. There, he moved in the company of the best known Yugoslav theatre directors, actors and journalists, participating in their lively discussions, especially in the old Triglav Café. Later, he moved to Germany, and then to Ljubljana, where he studied journalism. He remained there for the rest of his life. Pejić worked for years as a special Ljubljana correspondent to the Tanjug press agency.

Only fragments of his later life are known. He was discriminated on numerous occasions due to his Bosnian descent, disappointed in personal life, and had to struggle ever harder to survive. Despite this, he sporadically created new works of art. He was particularly affected by the Bosnian War, due to which he lost many of his best friends and peers from all the involved sides. In this time, he produced a series of paintings of the Mostar Bridge, and finished it about a week before it was destroyed. In 2006, he fell terminally ill, but nonetheless continued to create almost until his death later that same year.

== Work and exhibitions ==
Pejić's works were presented at exhibitions in Bosnia and Herzegovina. In Slovenia, he exhibited three times at a group exhibition of the Slovenian Sculpture Association in Ljubljana. He had sole exhibitions in the Avtotehna company's headquarters, in the Boss Club, at Workers' Hall (Delavski dom), and twice in the Garden Centre (Vrtnarija) part of Tivoli Park. At least four churches and monasteries in Bosnia and one in Slavonia are decorated by the frescoes he created in cooperation with Matzek. His sculptures are found in Slovenia, Bosnia, Austria and Serbia, and his paintings are found in Germany, Great Britain, and Australia. Many of them are owned privately.

Slobodan Pejić was the beginner and an unofficial proposer of a sculpture garden ("forma viva") in Tivoli Park north of Tivoli Pond. In 2000, he created a sculpture, named Sožitje ("Coexistence") from an oak that fell in a storm, and from bronze, and dedicated it to the citizens of Ljubljana. To preserve the wood, he worked in harsh winter conditions at −15 °C (5 °F), and to achieve better effect and deep personal connection with the tree, worked only with chisel. In August 2006, just after his death, an exhibition of his work was held at Ljubljana Town Hall and later at visiting exhibitions. A memorial retrospective exhibition of Pejić's work was held at the Ljubljana Town Hall in August 2007, where the new monography entitled "Slobodan Pejić" was also presented, just off the presses.

The material Pejić in his sculpture works preferred most was wood, particularly oak wood, which he formed with water, fire, hammer and chisel. The contours of his works are pure, ascetic and often highly stylised, e.g."The Upright Man" and "Look at me! Here I am!". They're often based on old pagan legends and folk culture, and on personal, societal and historical circumstances (e.g. Faronika). All his works radiate intensive emotions that are absorbed by the viewer and difficult to forget. The marble statues – The Girl, The Longing, and The Touch – are elegant and tender. His terracotas – Untitled, The Ship of Fools, The Fragment, The Leader – are expressive and semantically rich.

The paintings of Pejić are much darker and full of symbols than his sculptures. Through years, his works became ever more expressive. Colours gradually became purer and more intensive. He centred his work on a fight against the loss of human virtues and the dehumanisation of man. Pejić's paintings were much influenced by his sculpture work. There is no single redundant stroke there. Colors were squeezed directly from tubes and mixed on canvas. He started the images with brushes and finished them with fingers and hands.

== New technique ==
In May 2006, when Pejić was terminally ill, he invented a completely new method of sculpture. In collaboration with the expert in metallurgy and the casting master Jakob Mostar, he outlined the basic shape of the final casting in wax and planned in advance the self-formation of the sculpture according to the physical and chemical characteristics of the materials used and their expected behavior in the planned environmental conditions. For this purpose, he used fresh clay mould, into which the melted mass was poured directly, allowing in this way also to mix metal, glass or other basic materials on the spot. This leads to certain anticipated temperature- and gas-expansions that form the sculpture as outlined. Pejić termed the method the Big Bang Method, and the sculptures born in this way as "self-born sculptures". He finished three such sculptures before his death, and another four he had prepared in wax and mould for casting, were finished posthumously in collaboration with Mostar.

== Selected works ==
=== Sculptures ===
- The Grmeč Corrida (2004, bronze) – the sculpture of two bulls in a fight, which has been compared to a confrontation of the oppressor and the oppressed or of the Bosnian people and the Austrian Emperor. The Grmeč Corrida is a bullfight that takes place annually on Grmeč, a mount in the extreme west of Bosnia, for over 200 years.
- Scream or Wounded Man (1990–1993, polyester with patina) – the sculpture represents the last hopeless scream of a wounded man against the dehumanisation of him as well as his torturers. The author compared the statue to Bosnia and its people being hollowed out in the war, which was then in full swing, with only scorched shells remaining.
- The Upright Man (1992, oak) – he remains untouched in his dignity despite the fire, the wounds, all his losses and suffering, which could not dehumanize him: he still stands erect, and carries his books with him.
- Look at me! Here I am! (2000, oak) – this wooden statue represents a new small beautiful and healthy human being not aware of the burden it carries already as well as the one that will be inflicted upon it by the destiny.
- Family (1994, oak and lead) – the sculpture, a rare combination of oak and lead, reminds of the Muslim tombstones and of the war in Bosnia.
- Giving Birth (2005, mixed technique) – a fragile sculpture of an event deeply respected and admired by the author.
- Coexistence (2000, oak and bronze) – a rare of combination of materials that merge with each other and with the nature around it. The 4-metre (13 ft) statue has been grown over by moss and by lichen. The wood embraces a bronze part, named The Pure Heart.

=== Pictures ===
- Still-Life with Oil Colours and Brushes (oil on canvas, 1981), Still-Life with Bread and Bottle (oil on canvas, 1981), The Fireplace – the works depict things Pejić wished to have but did not, for example his studios were unheated and freezingly cold
- By the Fire (1995, oil on canvas)
- The Homeless (Spaso) (1992, oil on canvas)
- Waiting for the Son (Ph.D.) (2006, oil on canvas) – depicts the happiness on the realisation of a friend's life dreams
- The Two of Us (One Body One Soul) (unknown date, oil on canvas) – a man and a woman becoming one body and one soul
- The Pain (2006, oil on canvas), Angel on the Streets of Old-Town Ljubljana (2006, oil on canvas), Styx (2006, oil on canvas) – the last works, reflecting the sculptor's tragic in the few months before his early death.

== See also ==
- Jakov Brdar (1949–), a Bosnian sculptor living in Ljubljana
- Mirsad Begić (1953–), a Bosnian sculptor living in Ljubljana

== Sources ==
- Vanda Mušič (ed). Bassin, Aleksander. Kokot, Staša. Slobodan Pejić. Self-published by Vanda Mušič Chapman. 2007. ISBN 978-961-245-325-1.
