= Mycielin, Lubusz Voivodeship =

Mycielin
- Village
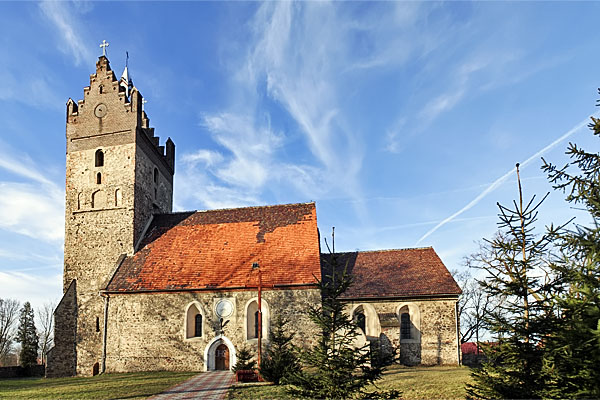
- Church of Saint Nicholas

- Location within Poland
- Coordinates: 51°38′N 15°42′E
- Country: Poland
- Voivodeship: Lubusz
- County: Żagań
- Gmina: Niegosławice

Population (approx.)
  - Total: 430

Mycielin [mɨˈt͡ɕɛlin] is a village in the administrative district of Gmina Niegosławice, within Żagań County, Lubusz Voivodeship, in western Poland.
