= Sucha Dolna, Lubusz Voivodeship =

Sucha Dolna
- Village
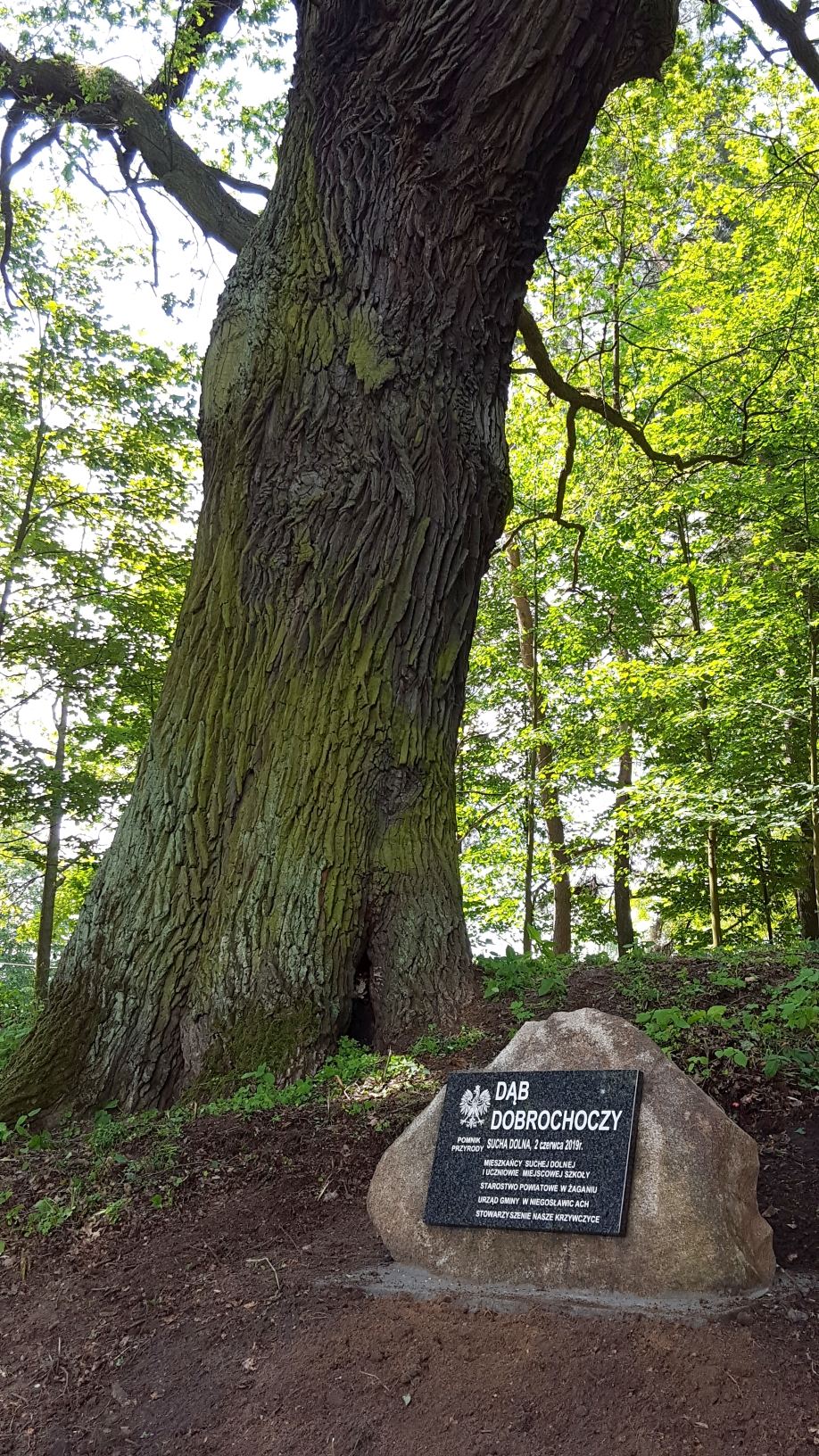

- Location within Poland
- Coordinates: 51°34′N 15°39′E
- Country: Poland
- Voivodeship: Lubusz
- County: Żagań
- Gmina: Niegosławice

Sucha Dolna [ˈsuxa ˈdɔlna] is a village in the administrative district of Gmina Niegosławice, within Żagań County, Lubusz Voivodeship, in western Poland.
