= Dašnica, Bijeljina =

Dašnica
- Location within Republika Srpska
- Coordinates: 44°50′N 19°10′E
- Country: Bosnia and Herzegovina
- Municipality: Bijeljina
- Time zone: UTC+1 (CET)
  - Summer (DST): UTC+2 (CEST)

Dašnica is a neighborhood within the city of Bijeljina, Bosnia and Herzegovina. It is located near Bijeljina's historic town square.

== History ==
The canal Dašnica, located throughout the neighborhood of the same name, overflowed during the May 2014 historic storm and flooding that hit the region and threatened both Crnjelovo Donje and Crnjelovo Gornje villages.
