= Municipality of Šempeter-Vrtojba =

Municipality of Slovenia

Municipality of Šempeter–Vrtojba Občina Šempeter - Vrtojba
- Municipality
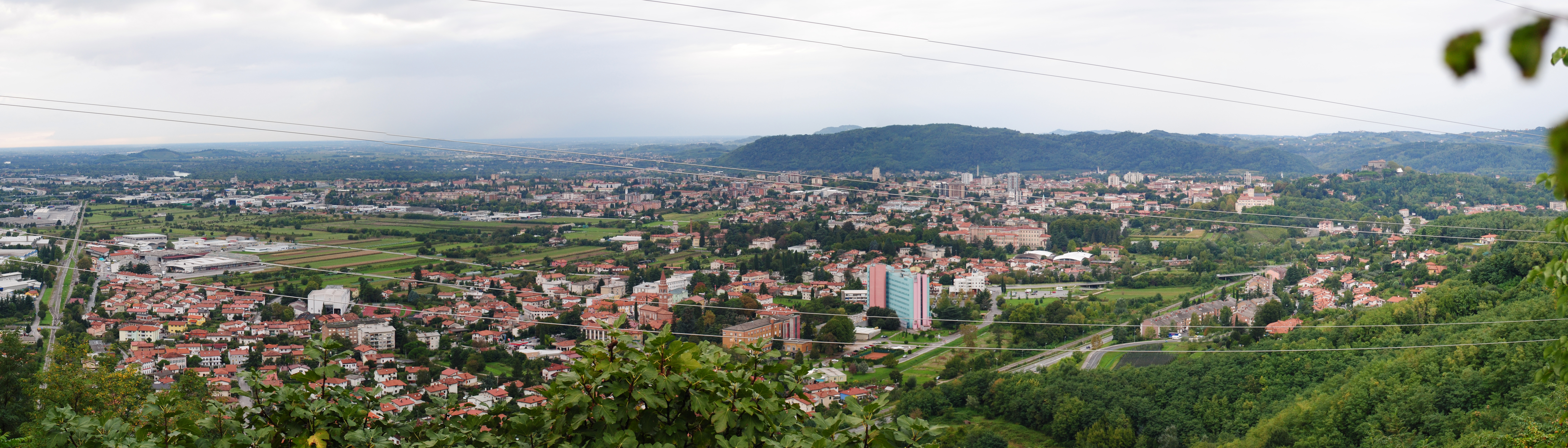
- Šempeter pri Gorici with the Italian town of Gorizia in the background

- Location of the Municipality of Šempeter–Vrtojba in Slovenia
- Coordinates: 45°55′N 13°39′E
- Country: Slovenia
- Traditional region: Littoral
- Statistical region: Gorizia

Government
  - Mayor: Milan Turk (SLS)

Area
  - Total: 15.0 km^{2} (5.8 sq mi)

Population (2021)
  - Total: 6,292
  - Density: 419/km^{2} (1,090/sq mi)
- Time zone: UTC+01 (CET)
  - Summer (DST): UTC+02 (CEST)
- Website: www.sempeter-vrtojba.si

The Municipality of Šempeter–Vrtojba (pronounced [ʃɛmˈpeːtəɾ ʋəɾˈtoːjba] or [ʃəmˈpeːtəɾ ʋəɾˈtoːjba]; Slovene: Občina Šempeter - Vrtojba; Italian: Comune di San Pietro-Vertoiba) is a municipality in Slovenia. The municipality comprises the town and municipal seat of Šempeter pri Gorici and the adjacent village of Vrtojba. It borders Italy.

== History ==
Both settlements used to be suburbs of town of Gorizia until 1947, when they become part of Yugoslavia while Gorizia remained a part of Italy. They have had a separate urban development since then. Nowadays, the Municipality of Šempeter-Vrtojba forms a single continuous urban area with the neighbouring towns of Nova Gorica and Gorizia. Since May 2011, these three municipalities have been joined in a common trans-border metropolitan zone, administered by a joint administration board.
