= Nowa Jabłona =

- Village
- Location within Poland
- Coordinates: 51°38′N 15°48′E
- Country: Poland
- Voivodeship: Lubusz
- County: Żagań
- Gmina: Niegosławice

Nowa Jabłona [ˈnɔva jaˈbwɔna] (German: Neugabel) is a village in the administrative district of Gmina Niegosławice, within Żagań County, Lubusz Voivodeship, in western Poland.
