= Bukovica, Renče–Vogrsko =

Bukovica

- Location in Slovenia
- Coordinates: 45°54′2.12″N 13°40′11.92″E
- Country: Slovenia
- Traditional region: Littoral
- Statistical region: Gorizia
- Municipality: Renče–Vogrsko

Area
  - Total: 2.18 km^{2} (0.84 sq mi)
- Elevation: 56.4 m (185 ft)

Population (2002)
  - Total: 510

Bukovica (pronounced [ˈbuːkɔʋitsa]; Italian: Boccavizza) is a village in the lower Vipava Valley in the Municipality of Renče–Vogrsko in the Littoral region of Slovenia.

== Name ==
Bukovica is a common toponym and oronym in Slovenia, and in South Slavic areas in general. It is derived from the adjective bukov 'beech' (from bukev 'beech tree') and originally referred to the local vegetation. The Italian name of the settlement was Boccavizza.

== Church ==
Saint Lawrence's Church

The parish church in the settlement is dedicated to Saint Lawrence and was rebuilt in 1928 after the old church in a slightly different location in the village was destroyed in the First World War. It belongs to the Koper Diocese.

== Cemetery ==
The World War I military cemetery in neighboring Vrtojba is most easily accessed from Bukovica.

== Notable people ==
Notable people that were born or lived in Bukovica include:

- Zoran Mušič, painter (1909–2005)
- Karel Bonutti, Slovenian-American scholar and diplomat (born 1928)
