= Pustkowie, Lubusz Voivodeship =

Pustkowie
- Village
- Location within Poland
- Coordinates: 51°36′55″N 15°48′16″E
- Country: Poland
- Voivodeship: Lubusz
- County: Żagań
- Gmina: Niegosławice

Pustkowie [pustˈkɔvjɛ] is a village in the administrative district of Gmina Niegosławice, within Żagań County, Lubusz Voivodeship, in western Poland.
