= Bukovica, Ivančna Gorica =

Bukovica
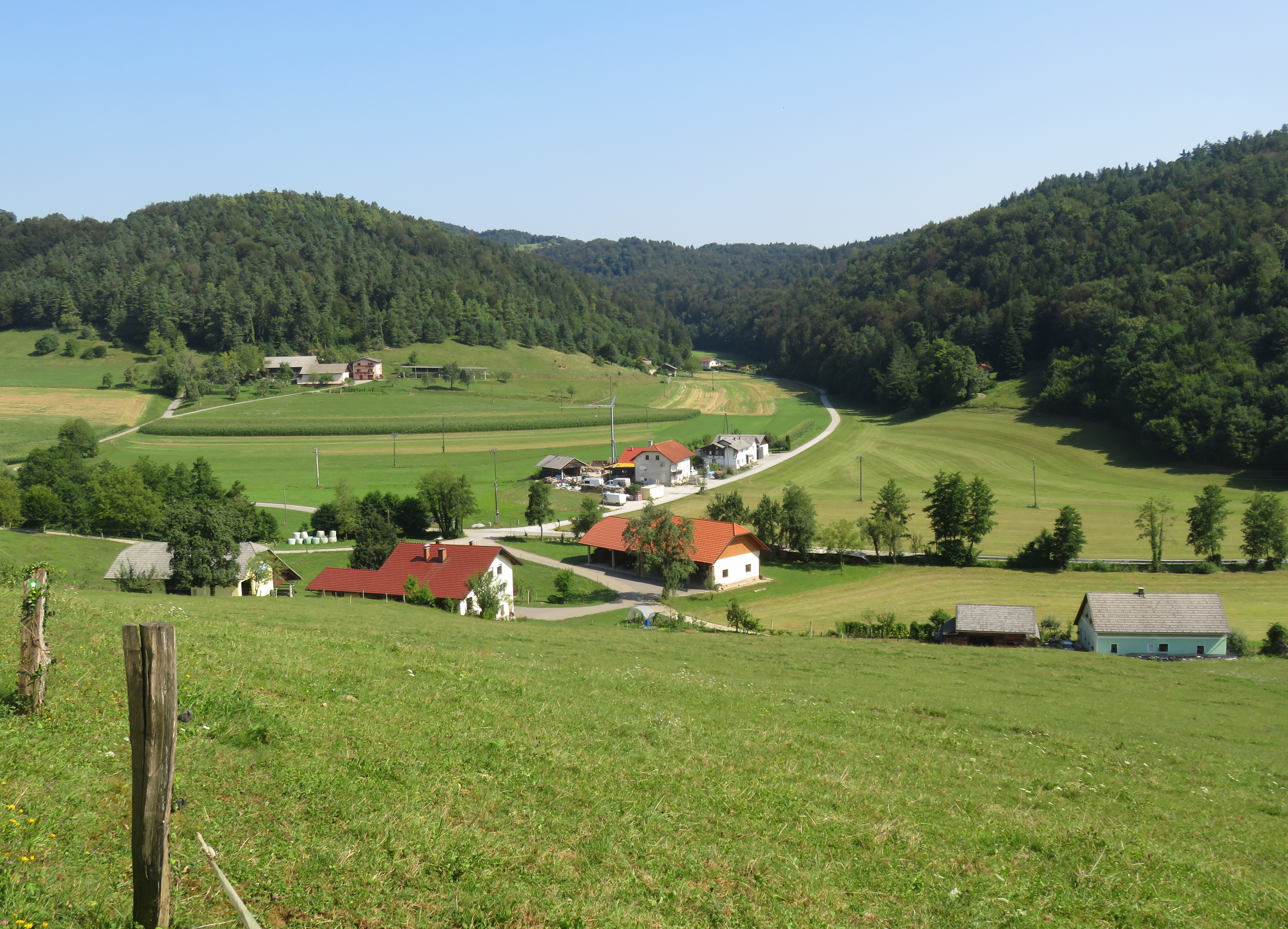

- Location in Slovenia
- Coordinates: 45°58′38.39″N 14°51′38.68″E
- Country: Slovenia
- Traditional region: Lower Carniola
- Statistical region: Central Slovenia
- Municipality: Ivančna Gorica

Area
  - Total: 5.08 km^{2} (1.96 sq mi)
- Elevation: 342.9 m (1,125 ft)

Population (2002)
  - Total: 85

Bukovica (pronounced [ˈbuːkɔʋitsa]; German: Bukowitz) is a village in the Municipality of Ivančna Gorica in central Slovenia. The area is part of the historical region of Lower Carniola. The municipality is now included in the Central Slovenia Statistical Region. It includes the hamlets of Brezovec (German: Bresowitz), Cerovec, Gornji Vrh, Potok, and Ukajdol.

== Name ==
Bukovica is a common toponym and oronym in Slovenia. It is derived from the adjective bukov 'beech' (from bukev 'beech tree') and originally referred to the local vegetation. In the past the German name was Bukowitz.

== Church ==
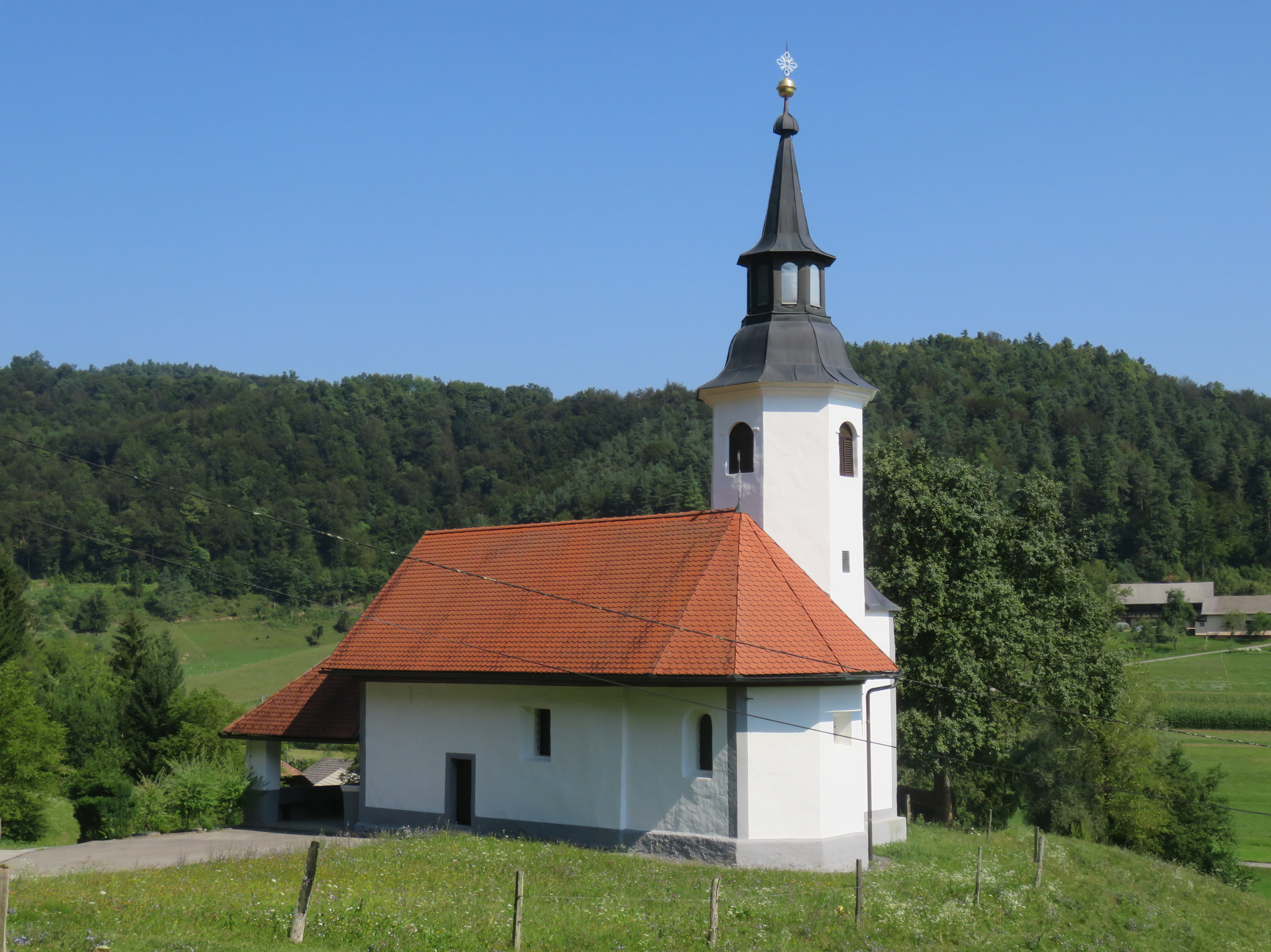
Saint John the Baptist Church

The local church is dedicated to John the Baptist and belongs to the Parish of Šentvid pri Stični. It dates to the 15th century with some 17th-century remodeling.
