= Bukovica, Rožaje =

Bukovica Буковица
- Village
- Location within Montenegro
- Country: Montenegro
- Municipality: Rožaje

Population (2011)
  - Total: 529
- Time zone: UTC+1 (CET)
  - Summer (DST): UTC+2 (CEST)

Bukovica (Serbian Cyrillic: Буковица) is a village in the municipality of Rožaje, Montenegro. It is located close to the Serbian border.

== Demographics ==
According to the 2011 census, its population was 529.

Ethnicity in 2011
Ethnicity	Number	Percentage
Bosniaks	383	72.4%
Serbs	80	15.1%
Montenegrins	7	1.3%
Albanians	7	1.3%
other/undeclared	52	9.8%
Total	529	100%
