= Mala Bukovica =

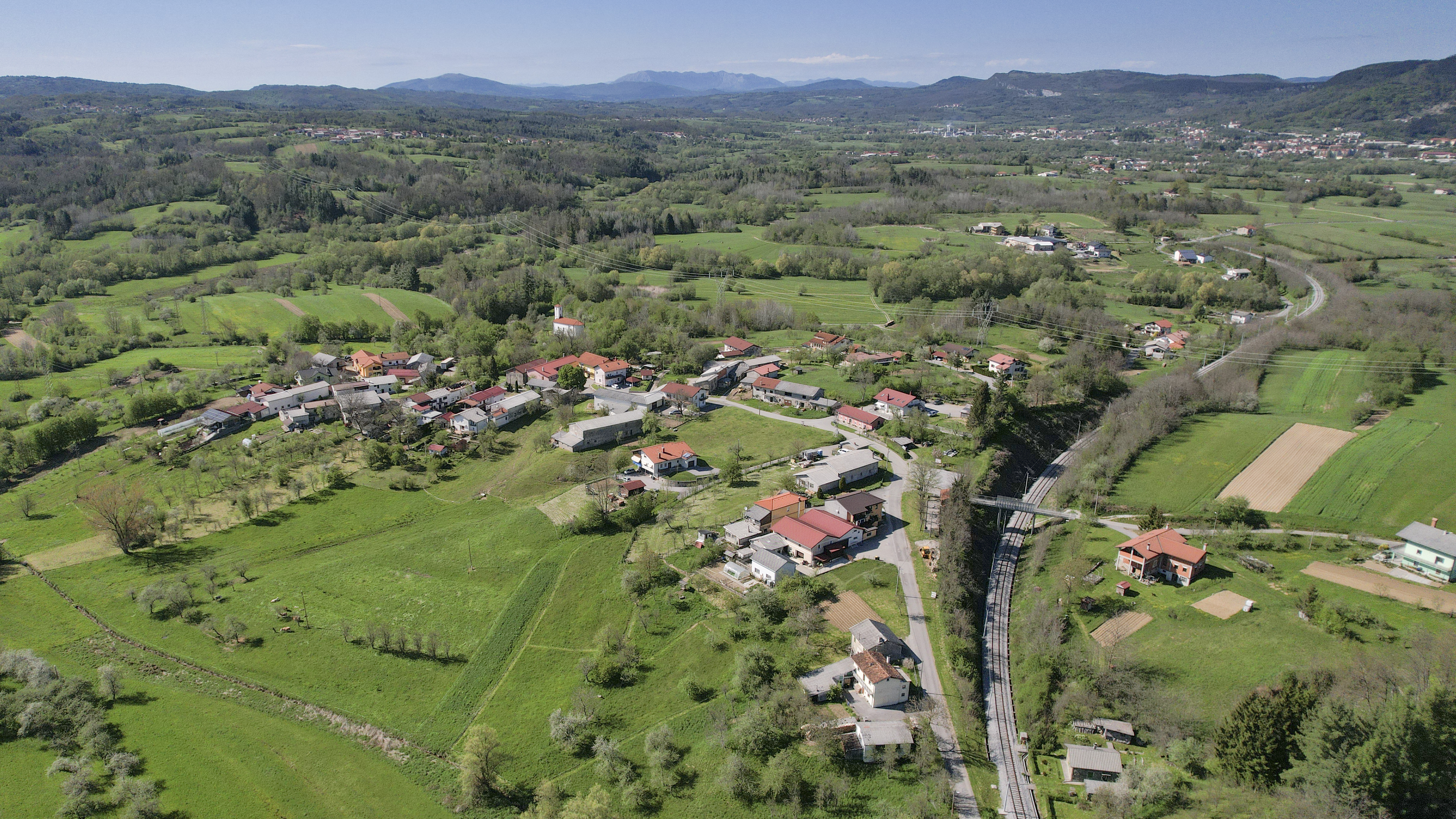

- Location in Slovenia
- Coordinates: 45°32′0.8″N 14°14′33.52″E
- Country: Slovenia
- Traditional region: Inner Carniola
- Statistical region: Littoral–Inner Carniola
- Municipality: Ilirska Bistrica

Area
  - Total: 3.72 km^{2} (1.44 sq mi)
- Elevation: 436.3 m (1,431 ft)

Population (2002)
  - Total: 161

Mala Bukovica (pronounced [ˈmaːla ˈbuːkɔʋitsa]; German: Kleinbukowitz, Italian: Bucovizza Piccola) is a village south of Ilirska Bistrica in the Inner Carniola region of Slovenia.

== Geography ==
Mala Bukovica is a compact village along a rail line on a low rise between Dolenje Creek (Slovene: Dolenjski potok), Molja Creek, and Kukurjevec Creek (a tributary of Molja Creek). It is connected by an older road to Koseze and by a newer road that branches off the main road from Ilirska Bistrica to Rupa, Croatia. Smaller roads lead from the village to Studena Gora and Veliko Brdo. There are fields in the Dednik area east of the village and in the area known as Boben south of that. Most of the meadows are in lower-lying areas. There are woods south of the village.

== Name ==
Mala Bukovica literally means 'little Bukovica', distinguishing the settlement from neighboring Velika Bukovica (literally, 'big Bukovica'). Bukovica is a common toponym and oronym in Slovenia. It is derived from the adjective bukov 'beech' (from bukev 'beech tree') and originally referred to the local vegetation. The Italian name of the settlement was Bucovizza Piccola.

== History ==
During the Second World War, the Partisans attacked and killed Italian troops at the village. In response, Italian forces hanged two men from the village on June 4, 1942.

=== Clandestine grave ===
Mala Bukovica is the site of a clandestine grave from the end of the Second World War. The Zparte Grave (Slovene: Grob Zparte) lies in a meadow and orchard about 500 meters (1,600 ft) southwest of Mala Bukovica. It contains the remains of a German soldier from the 97th Corps that fell at the beginning of May 1945.

== Church ==
The local church, built just outside the main settlement, is dedicated to Saint Roch and belongs to the Parish of Ilirska Bistrica.
