= Balatun =

Balatun Балатун (Serbian)
- Village (Selo)
- Location within Bosnia and Herzegovina
- Coordinates: 44°51′46.08″N 19°20′29.04″E
- Country: Bosnia and Herzegovina
- Entity: Republika Srpska
- City: Bijeljina

Population (2013)
  - Total: 1,351
- Time zone: UTC+1 (CET)
  - Summer (DST): UTC+2 (CEST)
- Postal code: 76300

Balatun (Serbian Cyrillic: Балатун) is a small village located north of the city of Bijeljina in Republika Srpska, Bosnia and Herzegovina.

== Demographics) ==
According to the 2013 census, its population was 1,286.

Ethnicity in 2013
Ethnicity	Number	Percentage
Serbs	1.277	99.30%
Croats	7	0.54%
other/undeclared	2	0.16%
Total	1.286	100%

== History ==
On 24 and 25 September 1992, 22 Bosniaks including seven children were removed from their homes in the village of Bukreš and taken to Balatun where they were killed and thrown into the Drina river.

== Notable people ==
Balatun is the birthplace of Slobodan Pejić, a Bosnian painter and sculptor.
