= Bukovica, Ivanjica =

Bukovica Буковица
- Town
- Location within Serbia
- Coordinates: 43°36′37″N 20°11′17″E
- Country: Serbia
- District: Moravica District
- Municipality: Ivanjica

Area
  - Total: 4.66 km^{2} (1.80 sq mi)

Population (2011)
  - Total: 1,669
  - Density: 358/km^{2} (928/sq mi)
- Time zone: UTC+1 (CET)
  - Summer (DST): UTC+2 (CEST)

Bukovica is a town in the municipality of Ivanjica, Serbia. According to the 2011 census, the town has a population of 1,669 inhabitants.
