= Dazdarevo =

Dazdarevo Даздарево (Serbian)
- Village (Selo)
- Location within Bosnia and Herzegovina
- Coordinates: 44°50′N 19°16′E
- Country: Bosnia and Herzegovina
- Entity: Republika Srpska
- Municipality: Bijeljina
- Time zone: UTC+1 (CET)
  - Summer (DST): UTC+2 (CEST)

Dazdarevo (Serbian Cyrillic: Даздарево) is a village in the municipality of Bijeljina, Republika Srpska, Bosnia and Herzegovina.
