= Donja Bukovica, Valjevo =

Donja Bukovica Доња Буковица
- Village
- Location within Serbia
- Coordinates: 44.311935°N 19.797964°E
- Country: Serbia
- District: Kolubara District
- Municipality: Valjevo

Population (2011)
  - Total: 460
- Time zone: UTC+1 (CET)
  - Summer (DST): UTC+2 (CEST)

Donja Bukovica (Serbian Cyrillic: Доња Буковица) is a village in the municipality of Valjevo, Serbia. According to the 2011 census, the village has a population of 460 people.
