= Dašnica, Aleksandrovac =

Dašnica
- Village
- Location within Serbia
- Coordinates: 43°28′N 21°09′E
- Country: Serbia
- District: Šumadija
- Municipality: Aleksandrovac

Population (2002)
  - Total: 697
- Time zone: UTC+1 (CET)
  - Summer (DST): UTC+2 (CEST)

Dašnica (Serbian Cyrillic: Дашница) is a village in the municipality of Aleksandrovac, Serbia. According to the 2002 census, the village has a population of 697 people.

== See also ==
- List of places in Serbia
