= Bukovica, Kruševac =

Coordinates: 43°29′48″N 21°19′04″E

Bukovica (Kruševac)
- Village
- Interactive map of Bukovica (Kruševac)
- Country: Serbia
- District: Rasina District
- Municipality: Kruševac

Population (2002)
  - Total: 242
- Time zone: UTC+1 (CET)
  - Summer (DST): UTC+2 (CEST)

Bukovica is a village in the municipality of Kruševac, Serbia. As of the 2002 census, the village had a population of 242 people.
