= Bukovica, Konjic =

Bukovica Буковица
- Village
- Location within Bosnia and Herzegovina
- Coordinates: 43°44′47″N 17°46′40″E
- Country: Bosnia and Herzegovina
- Entity: Federation of Bosnia and Herzegovina
- Canton: Herzegovina-Neretva
- Municipality: Konjic

Area
  - Total: 3.61 sq mi (9.36 km^{2})

Population (2013)
  - Total: 8
  - Density: 2.2/sq mi (0.85/km^{2})
- Time zone: UTC+1 (CET)
  - Summer (DST): UTC+2 (CEST)

Bukovica (Cyrillic: Буковица) is a village in the municipality of Konjic, Bosnia and Herzegovina.

== Demographics ==
According to the 2013 census, its population was 8, all Croats.
