= Velika Bukovica =

- Location in Slovenia
- Coordinates: 45°32′41.83″N 14°13′28.43″E
- Country: Slovenia
- Traditional region: Inner Carniola
- Statistical region: Littoral–Inner Carniola
- Municipality: Ilirska Bistrica

Area
  - Total: 4.28 km^{2} (1.65 sq mi)
- Elevation: 475.9 m (1,561 ft)

Population (2002)
  - Total: 184

Velika Bukovica (pronounced [ˈʋeːlika ˈbuːkɔʋitsa]; German: Großbukowitz, Italian: Bucovizza Grande) is a village southwest of Ilirska Bistrica in the Inner Carniola region of Slovenia.

== Name ==
Velika Bukovica literally means 'big Bukovica', distinguishing the settlement from neighboring Mala Bukovica (literally, 'little Bukovica'). Bukovica is a common toponym and oronym in Slovenia. It is derived from the adjective bukov 'beech' (from bukev 'beech tree') and originally referred to the local vegetation. The Italian name of the settlement was Bucovizza Grande.

== Church ==
The local church in the settlement is dedicated to Saints Cosmas and Damian and belongs to the Parish of Ilirska Bistrica.
