= Dragaljevac =

Village in Bosnia and Herzegovina

Dragaljevac Драгаљевац
| Location | Bijeljina, Republika Srpska |
| Population – (est.) – (1991 census) |
| Area code | +387 55 |
| Time zone | CET (UTC +1); CEST (UTC +2) |
| Website | www.OpstinaBijeljina.com |

Dragaljevac (Serbian Cyrillic: Драгаљевац) is a place located west of the city of Bijeljina in Republika Srpska, Bosnia and Herzegovina. There are 3 parts, Dragaljevac Donji, Dragaljevac Gornji and Dragaljevac Srednji.
