= Wilczyce, Gmina Niegosławice =

Wilczyce
- Village
- Location within Poland
- Coordinates: 51°39′N 15°50′E
- Country: Poland
- Voivodeship: Lubusz
- County: Żagań
- Gmina: Niegosławice

Wilczyce [vilˈt͡ʂɨt͡sɛ] is a village in the administrative district of Gmina Niegosławice, within Żagań County, Lubusz Voivodeship, in western Poland.
