= Ruhotina =

Ruhotina Рухотина (Serbian)
- Village (Selo)
- Location within Bosnia and Herzegovina
- Coordinates: 44°37′58″N 19°11′14″E
- Country: Bosnia and Herzegovina
- Entity: Republika Srpska
- Municipality: Bijeljina
- Time zone: UTC+1 (CET)
  - Summer (DST): UTC+2 (CEST)

Ruhotina (Serbian Cyrillic: Рухотина) is a village in the municipality of Bijeljina, Republika Srpska, Bosnia and Herzegovina.
