= Gornja Bukovica, Valjevo =

Gornja Bukovica Горња Буковица
- Village
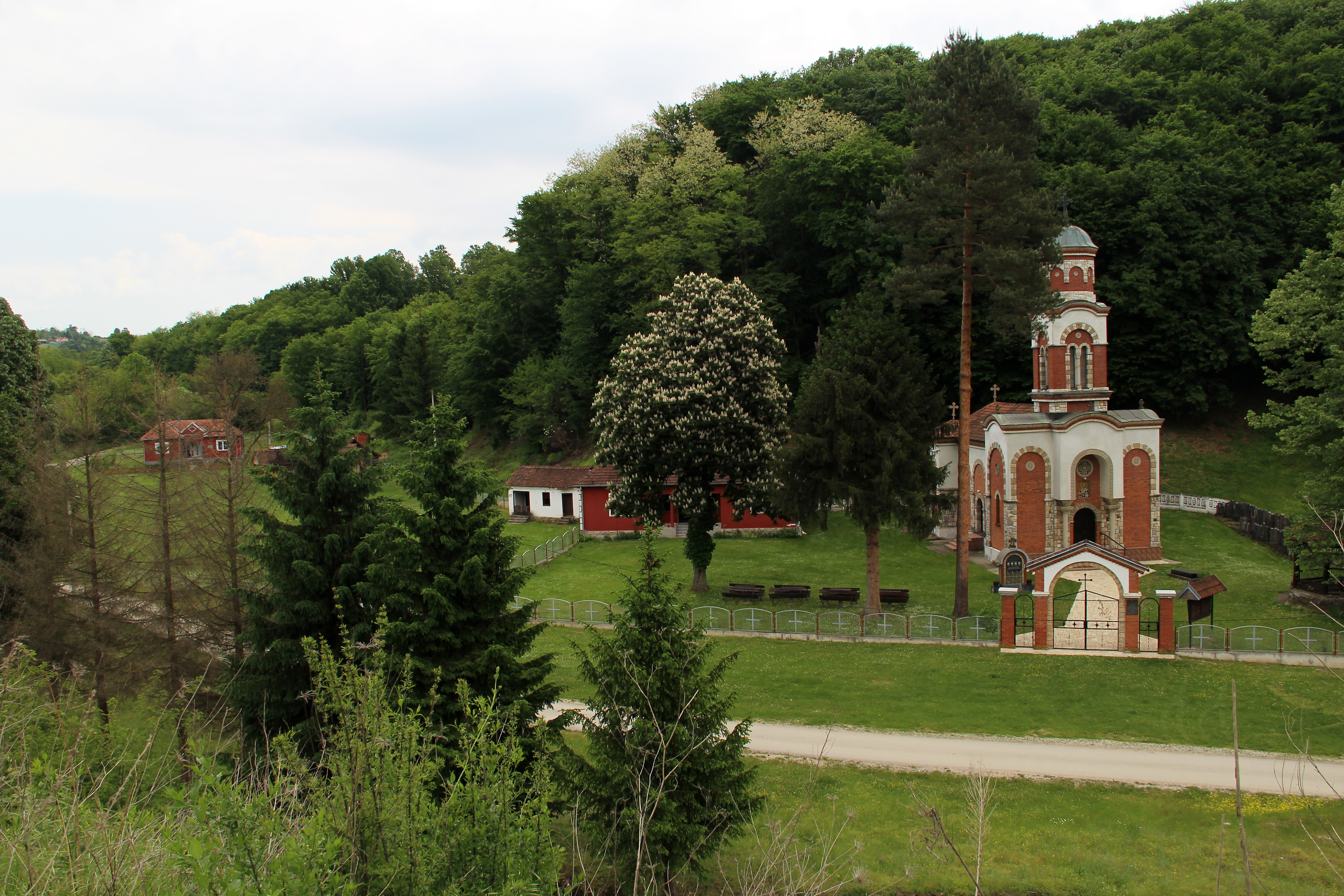
- Church of St. Nicholas

- Location within Serbia
- Coordinates: 44.337432°N 19.782901°E
- Country: Serbia
- District: Kolubara District
- Municipality: Valjevo

Population (2011)
  - Total: 890
- Time zone: UTC+1 (CET)
  - Summer (DST): UTC+2 (CEST)

Gornja Bukovica (Serbian Cyrillic: Горња Буковица) is a village in the municipality of Valjevo, Serbia. According to the 2011 census, the village has a population of 890 people.
