= Triješnica =

Triješnica Тријешница (Serbian)
- Village (Selo)
- Location within Bosnia and Herzegovina
- Coordinates: 44°49′15″N 19°14′53″E
- Country: Bosnia and Herzegovina
- Entity: Republika Srpska
- Municipality: Bijeljina
- Time zone: UTC+1 (CET)
  - Summer (DST): UTC+2 (CEST)

Triješnica (Serbian Cyrillic: Тријешница) is a village in the municipality of Bijeljina, Republika Srpska, Bosnia and Herzegovina.
