= Bukowica =

- Village
- Location within Poland
- Coordinates: 51°38′53″N 15°45′54″E
- Country: Poland
- Voivodeship: Lubusz
- County: Żagań
- Gmina: Niegosławice
- Population: 140

Bukowica [bukɔˈvit͡sa] is a village in the administrative district of Gmina Niegosławice, within Żagań County, Lubusz Voivodeship, in western Poland.
