= Jurzyn, Żagań County =

Jurzyn
- Village
- Location within Poland
- Coordinates: 51°39′39″N 15°49′39″E
- Country: Poland
- Voivodeship: Lubusz
- County: Żagań
- Gmina: Niegosławice

Jurzyn [ˈjuʐɨn] is a village in the administrative district of Gmina Niegosławice, within Żagań County, Lubusz Voivodeship, in western Poland.
