= Bukovica, Zenica =

Bukovica Буковица
- Village
- Location within Bosnia and Herzegovina
- Coordinates: 44°14′42″N 17°51′24″E
- Country: Bosnia and Herzegovina
- Entity: Federation of Bosnia and Herzegovina
- Canton: Zenica-Doboj
- Municipality: Zenica

Area
  - Total: 1.98 sq mi (5.12 km^{2})

Population (2013)
  - Total: 138
  - Density: 69.8/sq mi (27.0/km^{2})
- Time zone: UTC+1 (CET)
  - Summer (DST): UTC+2 (CEST)

Bukovica (Cyrillic: Буковица) is a village in the City of Zenica, Bosnia and Herzegovina.

== Demographics ==
According to the 2013 census, its population was 138.

Ethnicity in 2013
Ethnicity	Number	Percentage
Bosniaks	133	96.4%
other/undeclared	5	3.6%
Total	138	100%
