= Čađavica, Bijeljina =

Čađavica Чађавица
Location	Bijeljina, Republika Srpska
Population – (est.) – (1991 census)
Area code	+387 55
Time zone	CET (UTC +1); CEST (UTC +2)
Website	www.OpstinaBijeljina.com

Čađavica (Cyrillic: Чађавица) is a name of three different subdivisions located west of the city of Bijeljina in Republika Srpska, Bosnia and Herzegovina. The three different subdivisions are Čađavica Donja, Čađavica Gornja, and Čađavica Srednja.
