= Przecław, Lubusz Voivodeship =

Przecław
- Village
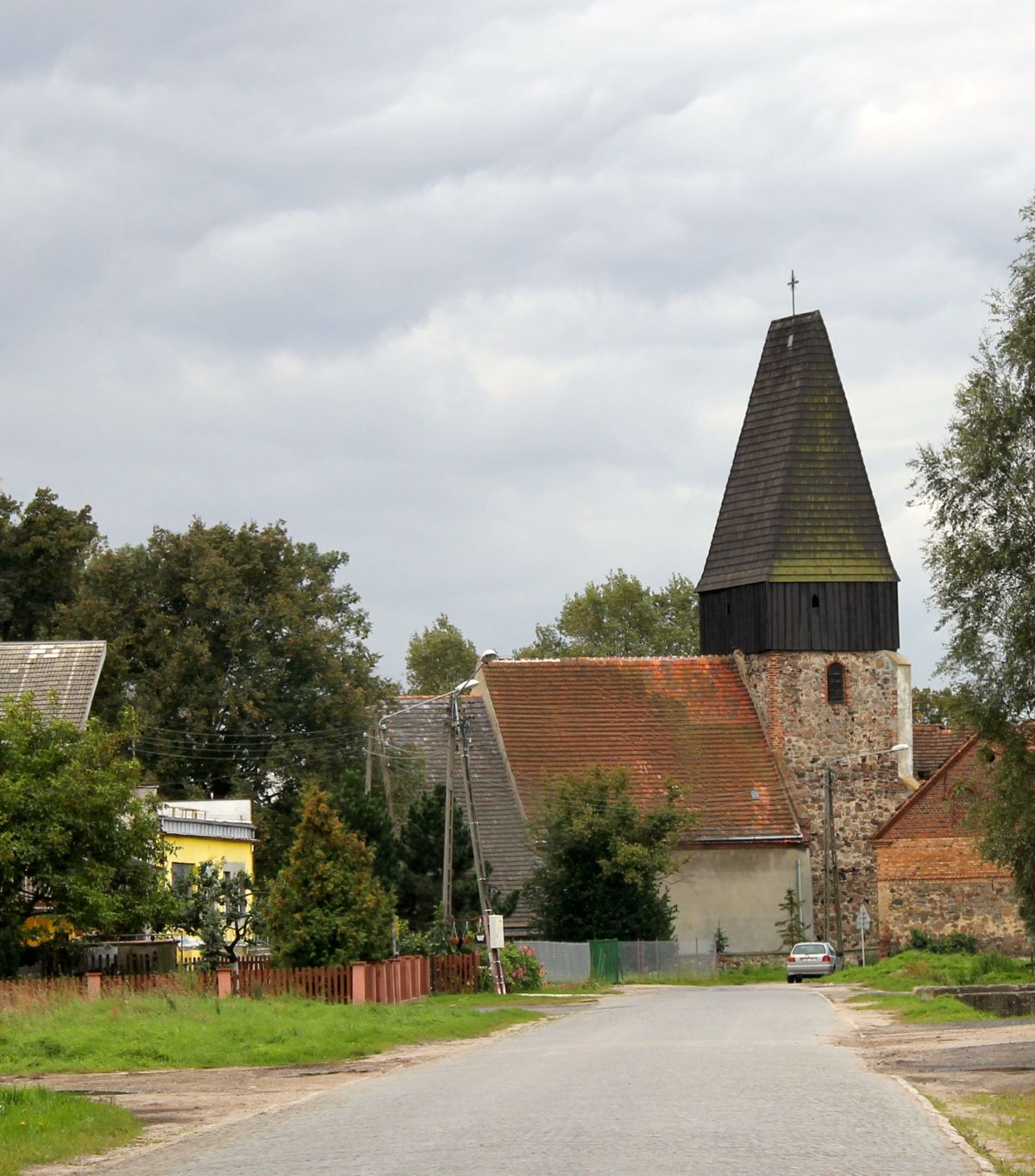

- Location within Poland
- Coordinates: 51°36′19″N 15°45′23″E
- Country: Poland
- Voivodeship: Lubusz
- County: Żagań
- Gmina: Niegosławice

Przecław [ˈpʂɛt͡swaf] is a village in the administrative district of Gmina Niegosławice, within Żagań County, Lubusz Voivodeship, in western Poland.
