= Kacevac =

Kacevac Кацевац (Serbian)
- Village (Selo)
- Location within Bosnia and Herzegovina
- Coordinates: 44°20′N 18°58′E
- Country: Bosnia and Herzegovina
- Entity: Republika Srpska
- Municipality: Bijeljina
- Time zone: UTC+1 (CET)
  - Summer (DST): UTC+2 (CEST)

Kacevac (Serbian Cyrillic: Кацевац) is a village in the municipality of Bijeljina, Republika Srpska, Bosnia and Herzegovina.
