= Bukovica Gornja =

Bukovica Gornja Буковица Горња (Serbian)
- Village (Selo)
- Location within Bosnia and Herzegovina
- Coordinates: 44°46′5.16″N 18°58′36.84″E
- Country: Bosnia and Herzegovina
- Entity: Republika Srpska
- City: Bijeljina
- Time zone: UTC+1 (CET)
  - Summer (DST): UTC+2 (CEST)

Bukovica Gornja (Serbian Cyrillic: Буковица Горња) is a village in the municipality of Bijeljina, Republika Srpska in north-eastern Bosnia and Herzegovina.

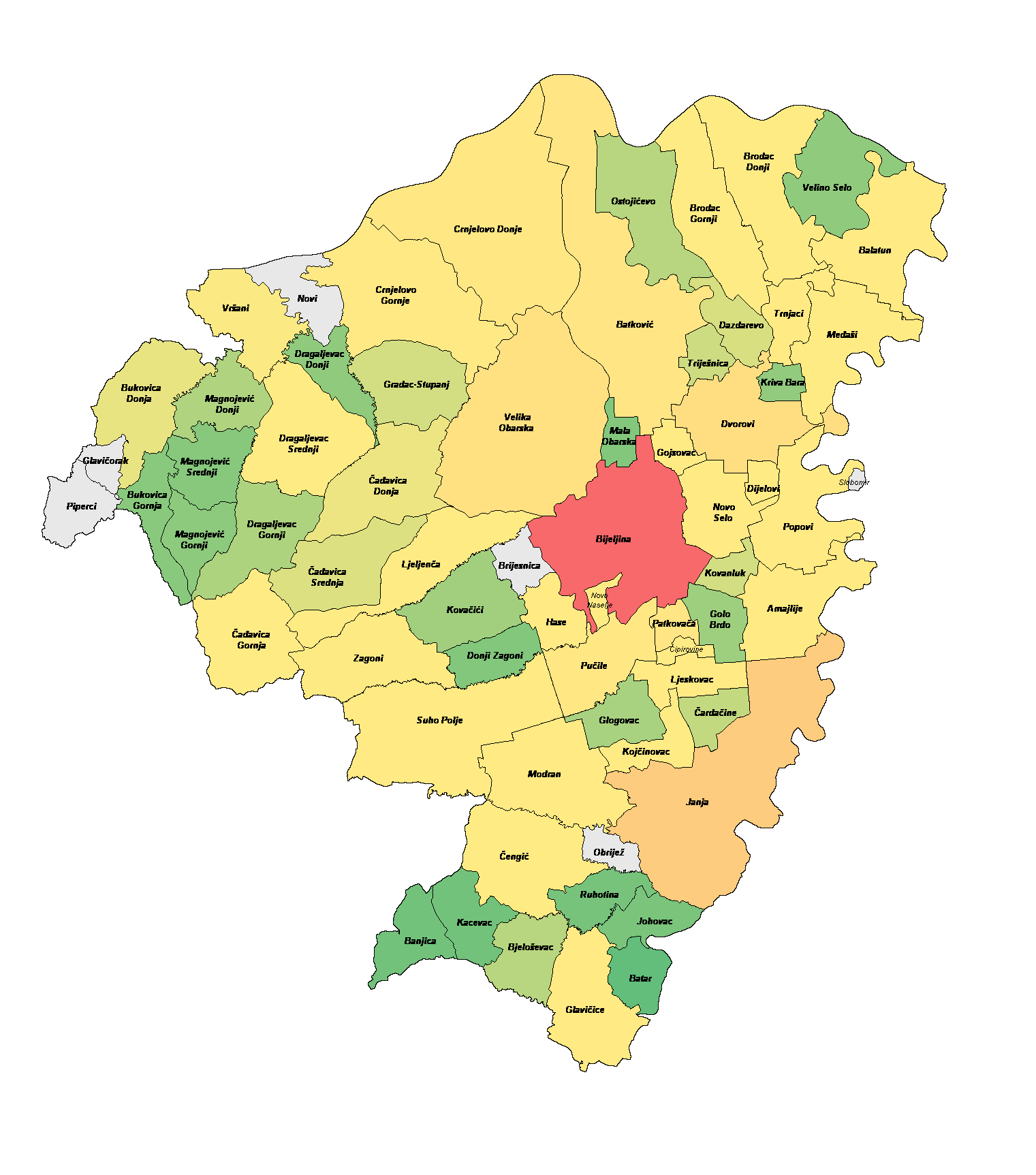
Bijeljina municipality by population proportional to the settlement with the highest and lowest population; Bukovica Gornja is in the west of the municipality
