= Bukovica Mala, Doboj =

Bukovica Mala Буковица Мала
- Village
- Location within Bosnia and Herzegovina
- Coordinates: 44°44′38″N 18°02′24″E
- Country: Bosnia and Herzegovina
- Entity: Republika Srpska
- Municipality: Doboj
- Time zone: UTC+1 (CET)
  - Summer (DST): UTC+2 (CEST)

Bukovica Mala (Cyrillic: Буковица Мала) is a village in the municipality of Doboj, Republika Srpska, Bosnia and Herzegovina.
