= Crnjelovo Donje =

Crnjelovo Donje Црњелово Доње (Serbian)
- Village (Selo)
- Location within Republika Srpska Location within Bosnia and Herzegovina
- Coordinates: 44°51′12.96″N 19°8′30.84″E
- Country: Bosnia and Herzegovina
- Entity: Republika Srpska
- City: Bijeljina

Population (2013)
  - Total: 2,450
- Time zone: UTC+1 (CET)
  - Summer (DST): UTC+2 (CEST)
- Postal code: 76300

Crnjelovo Donje (Serbian Cyrillic: Црњелово Доње) is a small village located north of the city of Bijeljina in Republika Srpska, Bosnia and Herzegovina.
