= Bukovica Velika, Doboj =

Bukovica Velika Буковица Велика
- Village
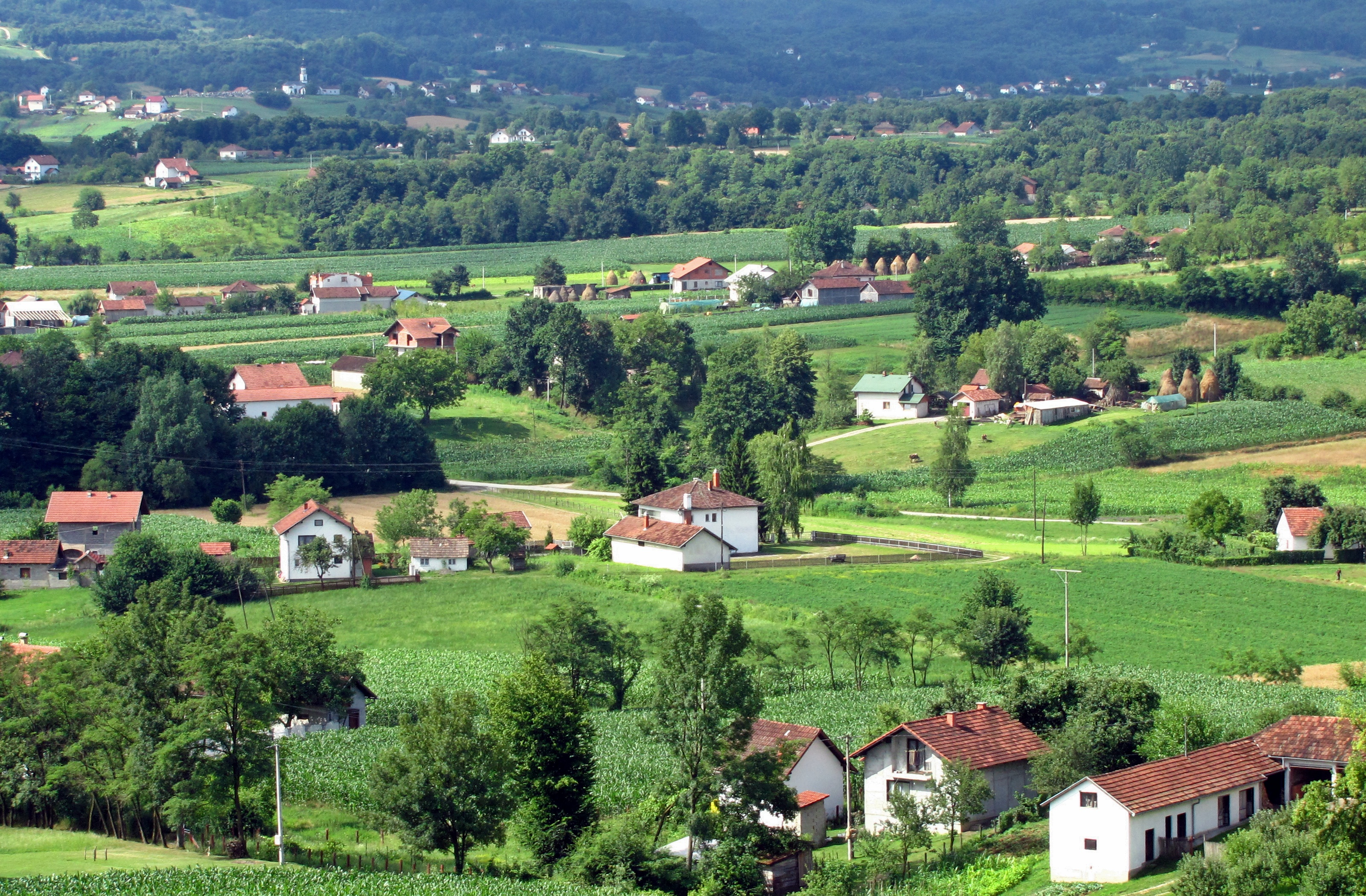

- Location within Bosnia and Herzegovina
- Coordinates: 44°46′21″N 18°01′09″E
- Country: Bosnia and Herzegovina
- Entity: Republika Srpska
- Municipality: Doboj
- Time zone: UTC+1 (CET)
  - Summer (DST): UTC+2 (CEST)

Bukovica Velika (Cyrillic: Буковица Велика) is a village in the municipality of Doboj, Republika Srpska, Bosnia and Herzegovina.
