= Bukovica Donja =

Bukovica Donja Буковица Доња (Serbian)
- Village (Selo)
- Location within Bosnia and Herzegovina
- Coordinates: 44°48′36.00″N 18°57′54.00″E
- Country: Bosnia and Herzegovina
- Entity: Republika Srpska
- City: Bijeljina
- Time zone: UTC+1 (CET)
  - Summer (DST): UTC+2 (CEST)

Bukovica Donja (Serbian Cyrillic: Буковица Доња) is a village in the City of Bijeljina, Republika Srpska, Bosnia and Herzegovina.
