= List of cities and towns in Republika Srpska =

This is a list of cities and towns in Republika Srpska:

- Banja Luka
- Berkovići
- Bijeljina
- Kostajnica
- Kozarska Dubica
- Bosanski Brod
- Bosanska Gradiška
- Derventa
- Doboj (RS)
- Foča
- Istočno Sarajevo (RS)
- Laktaši
- Modriča
- Nevesinje
- Novi Grad (RS)
- Petrovo
- Prijedor
- Prnjavor
- Srebrenica
- Teslić
- Trebinje
- Višegrad
- Zvornik
- Sipovo
