= List of municipal flags in the Lubusz Voivodeship =

The following list includes flags of municipalities (gminy) in the Lubuskie Voivodeship, Poland.

Flag of the Lubuskie Voivodeship

According to the definition, a flag is a sheet of fabric of a specific shape, colour and meaning, attached to a spar or mast. It may also include the coat of arms or emblem of the administrative unit concerned. In Poland, territorial units (municipal, city and county councils) may establish flags in accordance with the Act of 21 December 1978 on badges and uniforms. In its original version, it only allowed territorial units to establish coats of arms. Despite that many cities and municipalities adopted resolutions and used a flag as their symbol. It was not until the Act of 29 December 1998 amending certain acts in connection with the implementation of the state system reform that the right of voivodeships, counties and municipalities to establish this symbol of a territorial unit was officially confirmed.

In 2025, 57 of the 82 municipalities in Lubuskie Voivodeship had their own flag, until 2014 (i.e. until the merger with Zielona Góra). The symbol was established by the Voivodeship itself in 2000.

== List of municipal flags ==
=== City of Gorzów Wielkopolski ===
Wzór	Opis
	The city's flag was established on 6 May 1901, again on 29 December 1994. It is a rectangular flag with proportions of 6:11, divided into three equal horizontal stripes: green, white and red. In central part of the flag it may bear the city coat of arms.

=== Gorzów County ===
Municipality	Flag	Description
Gmina Bogdaniec		The flag of the municipality was established on 8 July 1996. It is a rectangular flag with proportions 6:11, divided into three equal horizontal stripes: green, gold and blue. In its central part, the municipal coat of arms may appear.
Gmina Deszczno		The first version of the municipal flag was established by Resolution No. VI/61/99 of 29 June 1999, while the current one was established by Resolution No. V/47/2007 of 28 March 2007. It is a rectangular flag, divided into three equal horizontal stripes: blue, green and red. In its central part may be placed the municipal coat of arms.
City of Kostrzyn nad Odrą		The city's flag was established on 13 June 1996. It is a rectangular flag with proportions of 10:21, divided into three equal horizontal stripes: blue, white and red.
Gmina Kłodawa		The current version of the municipality's flag was established on 26 September 2018. It is a rectangular flag with proportions of 5:8 white in colour, in the central part of which the municipal coat of arms is placed.
Gmina Santok		The first version of the municipal flag was established on 12 April 1996, The current one, designed by Kamil Wójcikowski and Robert Fidura, was established by resolution no. LXIX/596/2023 of 20 December 2023. It is a rectangular flag with proportions of 5:8, divided into three horizontal stripes: two red and one white in the ratio of 13:1:1. In the central part of the flag above the lower stripe there is an emblem from the municipal coat of arms.
City and gmina Witnica		The municipality's flag was established on 20 September 1996. It is a rectangular flag divided into three equal horizontal stripes: green, yellow and red.

=== Krosno county ===
Municipality	Flag	Description
Gmina Bobrowice		The municipal flag is a rectangular flag, divided into three equal horizontal stripes: red, yellow and green.
Gmina Bytnica		The municipality's flag is a rectangular flag, divided into two equal horizontal stripes: white and yellow, with a green triangle on the left side of the flag.
City of Gubin		The city's flag was established with the approval of the Provincial Office in Zielona Góra (letter no. KL-IV-071/78 of 19 July 1978). It is a rectangular flag with proportions 5:8, divided into three equal horizontal stripes: white, yellow and red.
Gmina Gubin		The municipal flag was established by Resolution No. XVII/79/2008 of 28 August 2009. It is a rectangular flag with proportions of 5:8, divided into three horizontal stripes: two blue and one yellow in the ratio of 1:3:1. In the central part the municipal coat of arms may be displayed.
City and gmina Krosno Odrzańskie		The municipal flag was established by Resolution No. XIX/107/2004 of 31 August 2004. It is a rectangular flag with proportions of 5:8, divided into three horizontal stripes: blue, white and green in the ratio 1:2:1.

=== Międzyrzecz County ===
Municipality	Flag	Description
Gmina Bledzew		The municipality's flag was established on 14 May 1996. It is a rectangular flag with proportions of 5:8, divided into three equal horizontal stripes: white, yellow and red.
City and gmina Międzyrzecz		The municipal flag is a rectangular flag with proportions of 5:8, divided into three horizontal stripes: two blue and one white in the ratio of 1:2:1. In the central part the municipal coat of arms is placed.
Gmina Pszczew		The current version of the municipal flag was established by Resolution No. X.61.2019 of 16 May 2019. It is a rectangular flag with proportions of 5:8, divided from the right obliquely into two parts: the upper left yellow, with the municipal coat of arms, and the lower right red.
City and gmina Skwierzyna		The municipality's flag was established before 1995. It is a rectangular piece of cloth with proportions of 5:8, divided into three equal horizontal stripes: gold, blue and silver.

=== Nowa Sól County ===
Municipality	Flag	Description
City and gmina Bytom Odrzański		The municipal flag was established by Resolution No. XVIII/143/2000 of 28 December 2000. It is a rectangular flag with proportions 5:8, divided into four horizontal stripes: yellow, black, white and blue in the ratio of 2:1:1:2. In the central part the municipal coat of arms is placed.
City and gmina Kożuchów		The municipal flag was established by Resolution No. IV/14/90 of 30 July 1990. It is a rectangular flag with proportions of 5:8, divided into three horizontal stripes: two blue and one white.
City of Nowa Sól		The city flag was established by Resolution No. XLIX/316/2002 of 23 August 2002. It is a rectangular flag with proportions of 9:13.5, divided into two parts in the ratio of 2:1: the left one, white, with the city coat of arms and the right one, divided into two equal horizontal stripes: gold and blue.
Gmina Nowa Sól		The flag of the municipality is a rectangular flag, divided in a chequered pattern into yellow and green rectangles (the canton is yellow). In the central part of the flag is the municipal coat of arms.
City and gmina Otyń		The flag of the municipality was established by Resolution No. XLVII.121.2017 of 14 December 2017. It is a flag of fabric with proportions of 5:8, divided into three triangles: two rectangular ones (green and red) and a white one between them. In its central part, the municipal coat of arms may appear.
Gmina Siedlisko		The flag of the municipality was established on 12 March 1998. It is a rectangular flag, divided into three equal horizontal stripes: red, white and blue, with a green wedge to the left of the patch.

=== Słubice County ===
Description	Flag	Opis
City and gmina Cybinka		The first version of the municipal flag was established in 1991, while the current one was established by Resolution No. XXVII/169/12 of 28 December 2012. It is a rectangular flag, divided into five vertical stripes: three white and two green in the ratio of 1:1:4:1:1. In the central part the municipal coat of arms is placed.
Gmina Górzyca		The municipal flag was established by Resolution No. XXVII/301/2002 of 9 October 2002. It is a rectangular flag with proportions of 5:8, divided into three equal horizontal stripes: two yellow and one red. In the central part of the flag, the municipal coat of arms may be displayed.
City and gmina Ośno Lubuskie		The first version of the municipal flag was established on November 19, 1996, the current one was established by Resolution No. IV/27/2019 of March 14, 2019. It is a rectangular flag with proportions of 5:8, divided into three horizontal stripes: two red and one white in the ratio of 1:5:1. In the central part of the flag the emblem from the municipal coat of arms is placed.
City and gmina Rzepin		The municipal flag was established by Resolution No. XIX/31/2008 of 13 June 2008. It is a rectangular flag with proportions 5:8, divided into two horizontal stripes: red and blue in the ratio of 3:1. In the central part above the lower stripe the municipal coat of arms is placed.
City and gmina Słubice		The municipality's flag is a rectangular flag with proportions of 5:8, divided into three horizontal stripes: two red and one white with a ratio of 1:8:1. In the central part the municipality's coat of arms is placed.

=== Strzelce-Drzezdenko County ===
Municipality	Flag	Description
City and gmina Drezdenko		The municipal flag was established on May 30, 1995, and again by Resolution No. XXX/183/96 of December 30, 1996. It is a rectangular flag with proportions 3:5, divided from the right obliquely into two parts: the upper left one is red, with the municipal coat of arms, and the lower right one is white.
City and gmina Strzelce Krajeńskie		The municipality's flag is a rectangular flag, divided into five vertical stripes: three red and two white (the central red being the widest). In the central part of the flag is placed the emblem from the municipal coat of arms.
Gmina Zwierzyn		The flag of the municipality was established by Resolution No. XLI/219/2014 of 26 February 2014. It is a rectangular flag with proportions of 5:8, divided into three equal vertical stripes: red, silver and gold. In the central part of the flag is the emblem from the municipal coat of arms.

=== Sulęcin County ===
Municipality	Flag	Description
Gmina Krzeszyce		The municipal flag is a rectangular flag divided into four equal horizontal stripes: green, yellow, white and red.
City and gmina Lubniewice		The municipality's flag was established by Resolution No. XXXIII/243/2013 of 16 August 2013. It is a rectangular flag with proportions of 5:8, divided into three equal vertical stripes: two blue and one white. In the central part of the flag is the emblem from the municipal coat of arms.
City and gmina Sulęcin		The municipal flag is a rectangular flag with proportions 10:16 white in colour, in the central part of which the municipal coat of arms is placed.
City and gmina Torzym		The flag of the municipality is a rectangular flag, divided into two equal horizontal stripes: blue and green. In the top right corner there are three stars, taken from the municipal coat of arms.

=== Swiebodzin County ===
Municipality	Flag	Description
Gmina Łagów		The municipal flag is a rectangular flag, white in colour with the municipal coat of arms in the central part.
Gmina Szczaniec		The municipal flag is a rectangular flag with proportions of 5:8, divided into three vertical stripes: two red and one yellow in the ratio of 3:2,5:3. In the central part of the flag the municipal coat of arms may be displayed.
City and gmina Świebodzin		The flag of the municipality was established on 22 December 1993. It is a rectangular flag with proportions of 5:8, divided into three equal vertical stripes: red, white and yellow. In the central part, the municipal coat of arms may be displayed.
City and gmina Zbąszynek		The municipal flag is a rectangular flag with proportions of 5:8, green in colour, in the central part of which the municipal coat of arms is placed.

=== Wschowa County ===
Municipality	Flag	Description
City and gmina Sława		The municipal flag was established by Resolution No. XXI/148/12 of 4 May 2012. It is a rectangular flag with proportions of 5:8, divided into three equal vertical stripes: yellow, white and red. In the central part of the flag, the municipal coat of arms may be displayed.
City and gmina Wschowa		The flag of the municipality is a rectangular flag with proportions of 5:8, divided into two equal horizontal stripes: white and blue. The municipal coat of arms is placed in the upper right corner.

=== City of Zielona Góra ===
Flag	Description
	The city's flag was established on 16 September 1965. It is a rectangular flag with proportions of 5:8, divided into two parts in the ratio of 1:2 - left side, yellow in colour and right, divided into two equal horizontal stripes: white and green.

=== Zielona Góra County ===
Municipality	Flag	Description
City and gmina Babimost		The municipality's flag was established on 28 January 1997. It is a rectangular flag with proportions 5:8, divided into three vertical stripes: two yellow and one red in the ratio of 1:2:1. In the central part of the flag is an emblem from the municipal coat of arms.
City and gmina Czerwieńsk		The municipality's flag, designed by Jacek Gębicki, was established by Resolution No. XIX/208/13 of 27 February 2013. It is a rectangular flag with proportions of 5:8, divided into five diagonal stripes: three red and two white.
City and gmina Kargowa		The municipality's flag was established in March 1998. It is a rectangular flag with proportions of 5:8, blue in colour, on the left side of which the municipal coat of arms is placed.
City and gmina Sulechów		The city's flag was established on 26 February 1993. It is a rectangular flag with proportions of 2:3, divided into two parts in the ratio of 1:2 - left, green in colour and right, divided into two equal horizontal stripes: white and red.

=== Zagań County ===
Municipality	Flag	Description
Gmina Brzeźnica		The commune flag, designed by Mieczysław Kołeczek, it was established by Resolution No. VI/25/07 of 27 April 2007. It is a rectangular flag with proportions 5:8, red in colour, with the municipal coat of arms to the left of it.
City and gmina Szprotawa		The municipality's flag was established on 28 April 1998. It is a rectangular flag, divided into three equal vertical stripes: yellow, red and blue. In the upper left corner of the patch is the municipal coat of arms. The image of the flag was established for the banner (vertical flag). When hanging the flag traditionally (horizontally), the yellow stripe is at the top and the coat of arms in the canton maintains its position and orientation - it is not rotated - the viewer views the coat of arms lying on its side.
Gmina Wymiarki		The municipal flag was established by Resolution No. XVIII/136/2001 of 26 April 2001. It is a rectangular flag with proportions of 5:8, divided into two equal horizontal stripes: yellow and red. In the central part of the flag is the municipal coat of arms.
City of Żagań		The municipality's flag was established on 10 December 1992. It is a rectangular flag with proportions of 2:3, divided into three equal horizontal stripes: two red and one yellow (the colours of the Duchy of Żagań).
Gmina Żagań		The municipal flag is a flag, divided into four horizontal stripes: red, white, yellow and green in the ratio of 2:1:1:2.

=== Zary County ===
Municipality	Flag	Description
City and gmina Jasień		The current version of the municipal flag was established by Resolution No. XXXIX/340/14 of 18 September 2014. It is a rectangular sheet of fabric with proportions of 2:3, divided into three horizontal stripes: two red and one yellow in the ratio of 1:2:1 In its central part the municipal coat of arms may be displayed.
Gmina Lipinki Łużyckie		The municipal flag was established by Resolution No. XXI/106/96 of 30 July 1996. It is a rectangular flag with proportions of 5:8, divided into four equal horizontal stripes: white, red, yellow and green.
City and gmina Lubsko		The municipal flag is a rectangular flag with proportions of 5:8, divided into three equal horizontal stripes: white, yellow and red. The municipal coat of arms may appear on the upper left-hand side of the flag.
City of Łęknica		The city's flag was established on 18 March 1992. It is a rectangular flag with proportions of 1:2, divided into two equal horizontal stripes: green and brown.
Gmina Trzebiel		The municipal flag was established by Resolution No. V/22/03 of 27 March 2003. It is a rectangular flag with proportions of 5:8, divided into two equal horizontal stripes: red and yellow. In the central part of the flag the municipal coat of arms is displayed.
Gmina Tuplice		The flag of the municipality is a rectangular flag, divided into three equal horizontal stripes: blue, red and yellow. In the central part of the flag is the municipal coat of arms.
City of Żary		The city flag is a rectangular flag with proportions of 5:8, divided in a chequered pattern into four equal parts: white, yellow, red and black. The fields in the ceremonial version of the flag it features symbols from the city's coat of arms.

== Former municipal flags ==
Flag	Municipality	Description
	Gmina Zielona Góra	The municipality's flag was established by Resolution No. XXXIII/259/09 of 26 August 2009, abolished on 31 December 2014, with the merger of the municipality with the city of Zielona Góra. It was a rectangular flag with proportions of 5:8, with a green triangle in the centre and two yellow rectangular triangles on either side of it. In its central part of the flag is displayed an emblem from the municipal coat of arms.
	Gmina Pszczew	Previously, it was a rectangular flag with proportions of 6:11, white in colour, in the central part of which the municipal coat of arms was placed.

== See also ==
- List of county flags in the Lubusz Voivodeship
