= Rudd (surname) =

Rudd is a surname. Notable people with the surname include:

- Alyson Rudd, British journalist
- Amber Rudd, British Conservative Party MP
- Archibald Rudd, English footballer
- Beverly Rudd, British actress
- Bevil Rudd (1894–1948), South African athlete, Olympic gold medalist
- Billy Rudd (born 1941), English footballer
- Channing Rudd (1875–1920), American government official, lawyer, and academic administrator
- Charles Rudd (1844–1916), business associate of Cecil John Rhodes
- Christopher Rudd (born 1963), English cricketer
- Christopher E. Rudd (born 1953), Canadian/British immunologist
- Daniel Rudd (1854–1933), founder of the National Black Catholic Congress
- Delaney Rudd (born 1962), American professional basketball player 1989–1993
- Dwayne Rudd (born 1976), American professional football linebacker
- Eldon Rudd (1920–2002), American politician, U.S. Representative from Arizona 1977–1987
- Emily Rudd (born 1993), American actress
- George Thomas Rudd (c. 1795 – 1847), English entomologist
- Hughes Rudd (1921–1992), American television journalist
- Jim Rudd (born 1943), American lobbyist and politician
- Jim Rudd (rugby league) rugby league footballer of the 1920s
- John Rudd (disambiguation), several people
- Jonathan Rudd (disambiguation), several people
- Kevin Rudd (born 1957), Australian politician, Prime Minister of Australia 2007–2010 and 2013
- Mark Rudd (born 1947), American educator and anti-war activist
- Mike Rudd (born 1945), New Zealand musician
- Nigel Rudd (born 1946), British fellow of the Institute of Chartered Accountants
- Paul Rudd (born 1969), American film and stage actor
- Paul Rudd (DJ) (born 1979), English music producer and DJ
- Paul Ryan Rudd (1940–2010), American actor
- Phil Rudd (born 1954), drummer of the Australian band AC/DC
- Ricky Rudd (born 1956), American NASCAR driver
- Roland Rudd (born 1961), English businessman and public relations executive, brother of Amber Rudd
- Roswell Rudd (1935–2017), American jazz trombonist
- Roy H. Rudd (1906–1997), New York politician
- Steele Rudd, pseudonym of Arthur Hoey Davis (1868–1935), Australian author
- Stephen A. Rudd (1874–1936), American politician, U.S. Representative from New York 1931–1936
- Tony Rudd (1924–2017), English stockbroker and father of Amber Rudd and Roland Rudd
- Van Thanh Rudd (born 1973), Australian artist and activist, nephew of Kevin Rudd
- Velva E. Rudd (1910–1999), American botanist
- Xavier Rudd (born 1978), Australian folk musician

== See also ==
- Rudnitsky, shortened to Rudd, in the case of Paul Rudd
