= Sobieraj =

- Village
- Location within Poland
- Coordinates: 52°29′57″N 15°10′38″E
- Country: Poland
- Voivodeship: Lubusz
- County: Sulęcin
- Gmina: Lubniewice

Sobieraj [sɔˈbjɛrai̯] is a village in the administrative district of Gmina Lubniewice, within Sulęcin County, Lubusz Voivodeship, in western Poland.
