= Malta, Lubusz Voivodeship =

Malta
- Village
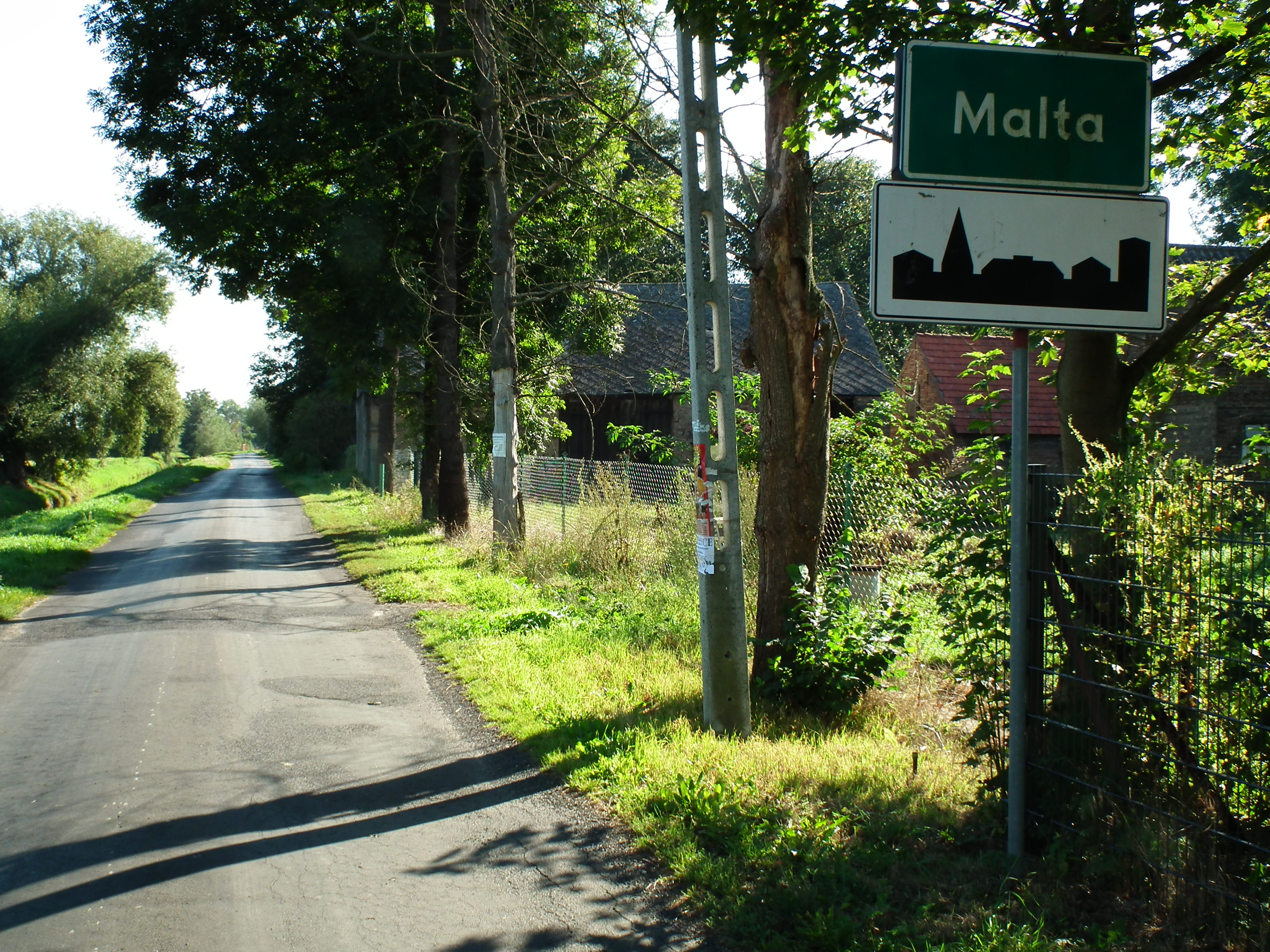

- Location within Poland
- Coordinates: 52°36′N 15°1′E
- Country: Poland
- Voivodeship: Lubusz
- County: Sulęcin
- Gmina: Krzeszyce
- Population: 130

Malta [ˈmalta] is a village that is located in the administrative district of Gmina Krzeszyce, within Sulęcin County, Lubusz Voivodeship, in western Poland.
