= Dzierzążna =

- Village
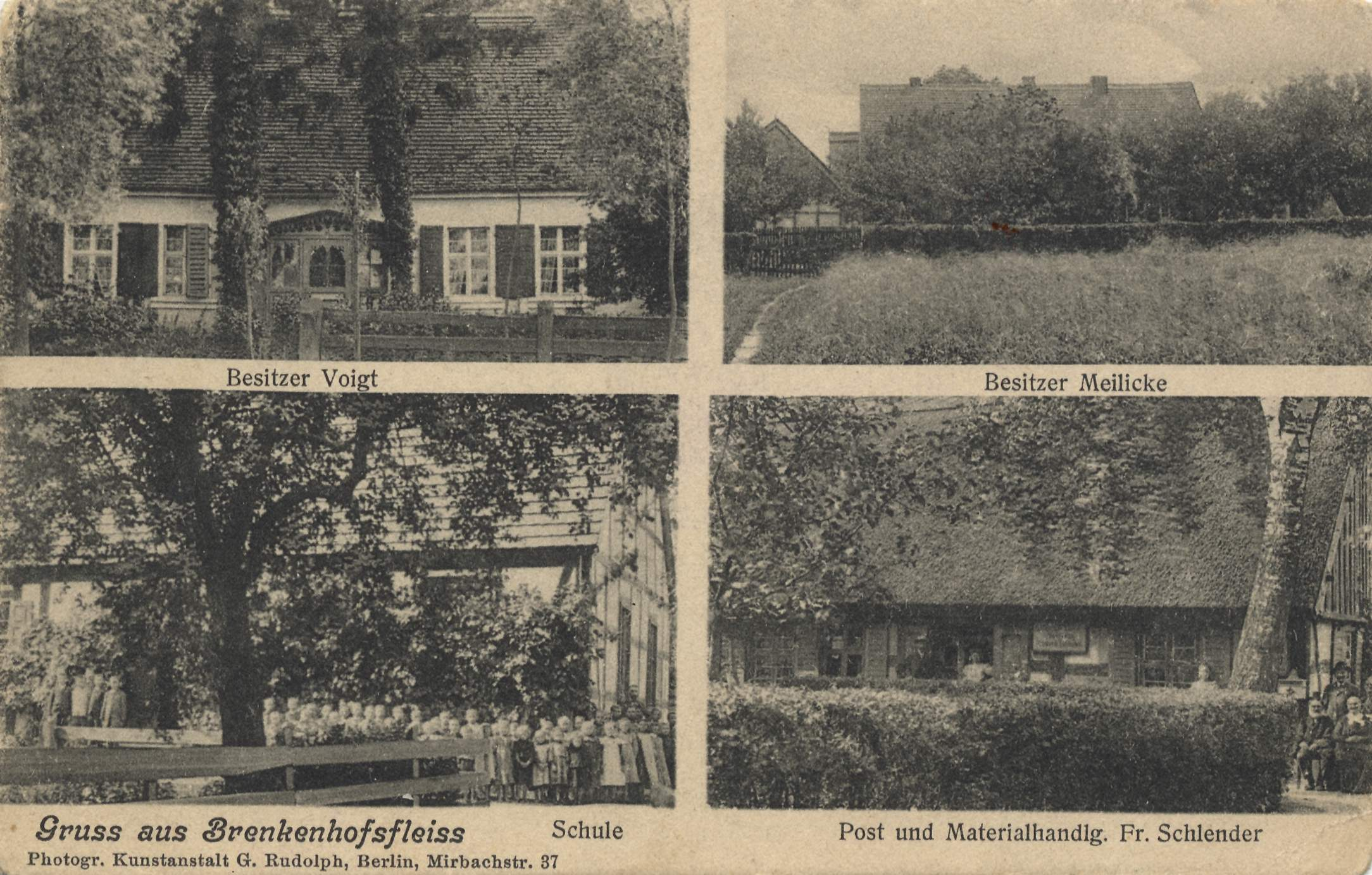

- Location within Poland
- Coordinates: 52°36′11″N 15°0′0″E
- Country: Poland
- Voivodeship: Lubusz
- County: Sulęcin
- Gmina: Krzeszyce
- Population: 110

Dzierzążna [d͡ʑɛˈʐɔ̃ʐna] is a village in the administrative district of Gmina Krzeszyce, within Sulęcin County, Lubusz Voivodeship, in western Poland.
