= Łukomin =

- Village
- Location within Poland
- Coordinates: 52°36′N 15°4′E
- Country: Poland
- Voivodeship: Lubusz
- County: Sulęcin
- Gmina: Krzeszyce
- Population: 80

Łukomin [wuˈkɔmin] is a village in the administrative district of Gmina Krzeszyce, within Sulęcin County, Lubusz Voivodeship, in western Poland.
