= Georg Schentke =

German World War II flying ace (1919–1942)

- Born: 23 November 1919; Kriescht, Weimar Republic
- Died: 25 December 1942 (aged 23); Stalingrad, Russia
- Military career
- Allegiance: Nazi Germany
- Branch: Luftwaffe
- Service years: 1938–1942
- Rank: Oberleutnant (Posthumously)
- Unit: JG 3
- Conflicts: World War II: Battle of France; Battle of Britain; Operation Barbarossa; Demyansk Pocket; Battle of Stalingrad
- Awards: Knight's Cross of the Iron Cross

Georg 'Peterle' Schentke (23 November 1919 – 25 December 1942) was a Luftwaffe ace and recipient of the Knight's Cross of the Iron Cross during World War II. The Knight's Cross of the Iron Cross, and its variants were the highest awards in the military and paramilitary forces of Nazi Germany during World War II.

== Career ==
Schentke was born on 23 November 1919 in Kriescht in the Province of Brandenburg within the Weimar Republic, present-day Krzeszyce in western Poland. Following flight and fighter pilot training, (Note: Flight training in the Luftwaffe progressed through the levels A1, A2 and B1, B2, referred to as A/B flight training. A training included theoretical and practical training in aerobatics, navigation, long-distance flights and dead-stick landings. The B courses included high-altitude flights, instrument flights, night landings and training to handle the aircraft in difficult situations.) Schentke was posted to 9. Staffel (9th squadron) of Jagdgeschwader 3 (JG 3—3rd Fighter Wing) on 1 March 1940. The Staffel was subordinated to the newly created III. Gruppe (3rd group) of JG 3, based at Jena. The Gruppe was commanded by Hauptmann Walter Kienitz and equipped with the Messerschmitt Bf 109 E-1 and E-3. On 28 March 1940, III. Gruppe of JG 3 was considered operationally ready and transferred to Detmold Airfield where it was tasked with defending Germany's western border during the "Phoney War". On 10 April, the Gruppe relocated to Hopsten Airfield. In preparation for the Battle of France, III. Gruppe was subordinated to Luftflotte 2, supporting Army Group Bs attack into the Netherlands. Schentke claimed his first aerial victory on 8 June when he shot down a Bristol Blenheim bomber.

Schentke claimed his first aerial victory during the Battle of Britain on 7 September during Operation Loge, the first deliberate attack on London which mainly targeted the Port of London. That day, III. Gruppe had been tasked with escorting the returning Luftwaffe bombers following their bomb run. On this mission, Schentke claimed a Royal Air Force (RAF) Supermarine Spitfire fighter shot down. He claimed a second Spitfire shot down on 1 December. On 15 February 1941, III. Gruppe was withdrawn from the English Channel and relocated to Gütersloh Airfield for a period of rest and replenishment. Schentke and other pilots of III. Gruppe spent a couple of days of R&R skiing in the Kleinwalsertal before returning for active service on 17 March. On 17 April, the Gruppe received the then new Bf 109 F-2, training on this type until they relocated to Lillers, France on 3 May. On 15 May, Schentke claimed his last aerial victory over the RAF when he shot down a Hawker Hurricane fighter.

=== Eastern Front ===
The Gruppe relocated to an airfield at Moderówka on 18 June where the Gruppe concluded their last preparations for Operation Barbarossa, the German invasion of the Soviet Union. At the start of the campaign, JG 3 was subordinated to the V. Fliegerkorps (5th Air Corps), under command of General der Flieger Robert Ritter von Greim, which was part of Luftflotte 4 (4th Air Fleet), under command of Generaloberst Alexander Löhr. These air elements supported Generalfeldmarschall Gerd von Rundstedt's Heeresgruppe Süd (Army Group South), with the objective of capturing Ukraine and its capital Kiev. Then, continuing eastward over the steppes of southern USSR to the Volga with the aim of controlling the oil-rich Caucasus Schentke claimed his first aerial victory on the Eastern Front on 24 June when he shot down a Soviet Polikarpov I-15 biplane fighter aircraft. (Note: According to Weal claimed as a Polikarpov I-16 fighter.) Over the next weeks, Schentke frequently flew as wingman to Hauptmann Walter Oesau, who was the Gruppenkommandeur (group commander) of III. Gruppe of JG 3. On 4 September 1941, Schentke and fellow JG 3 pilot Oberfeldwebel Hans Stechmann, received the Knight's Cross of the Iron Cross (Ritterkreuz des Eisernes Kreuzes) for 30 aerial victories claimed.

On 6 November, III. Gruppe was withdrawn from the Eastern Front and sent to Mannheim-Sandhofen Airfield for a period of rest and replenishment. The first elements of the Gruppe arrived by train in Mannheim on 8 December, the transfer was completed a week later. There, the personnel was sent on home leave. Following the death of Generaloberst Ernst Udet, Reichsmarschall Hermann Göring ordered JG 3 to be given the honorary name "Udet" on 1 December. The Gruppe received a full complement of 41 Bf 109 F-4 aircraft and on 6 January 1942 was ordered to relocated to Sicily. On 13 January, 7. Staffel and elements of 8. and 9. Staffel boarded a train to Bari in southern Italy while the rest of III. Gruppe headed for Sciacca, Sicily. The relocation progressed until 26 January when new orders were received, ordering the Gruppe to return to Germany. At Jesau near Königsberg, present-day Kaliningrad in Russia, III. Gruppe began preparations for redeployment to the Eastern Front.

Supporting German forces fighting in the Demyansk Pocket on 18 February 1942, Schentke claimed a Mikoyan-Gurevich MiG-3 fighter shot down, which may have been misidentified Lavochkin-Gorbunov-Gudkov LaGG-3 fighters. In late July 1942, after 71 aerial victories claimed, Schentke was transferred to Ergänzungsgruppe Süd (Supplementary Fighter Group South) as an instructor, promoted to Leutnant (second lieutenant) and awarded the German Cross in Gold (Deutsches Kreuz in Gold) on 24 September.

=== Stalingrad and missing in action ===
In November 1942, Schentke returned to the Eastern Front and was assigned to the 2. Staffel of JG 3. At the time the Staffel was under the command of Oberleutnant Detlev Rohwer. In December, Schentke volunteered for the Platzschutzstaffel (airfield defence squadron) of the Pitomnik Airfield. The Staffel, largely made up from volunteers from I. and II. Gruppe of JG 3, was responsible for providing fighter escort to Junkers Ju 52 transport aircraft and Heinkel He 111 bombers shuttling supplies for the encircled German forces fighting in the Battle of Stalingrad. On 12 December 1942, the German LVII Panzer Corps of the 4th Panzer Army began its north-eastward drive from Kotelnikovo toward German forces trapped in the Stalingrad pocket. That day, JG 3 supported the attack in the combat area south of Stalingrad. During these missions, Schentke claimed six aerial victories, making him an "ace-in-a-day" for the second time.

On 25 December 1942, Schentke claimed an Ilyushin Il-2 ground-attack aircraft and was then was shot down in aerial combat with Soviet bombers near the Kotluban train station. Although he was seen to bail out of his Bf 109 G-2 (Werknummer 13885—factory number) behind enemy lines, Schentke remains missing in action. (Note: According to Hiestand, Schentke was captured and taken prisoner of war after he was shot down.) He was posthumously promoted to Oberleutnant (first lieutenant).

== Summary of career ==
=== Aerial victory claims ===
According to Spick, Schentke was credited with 87 aerial victories, including four during the Battle of France and Britain and further 83 on the Eastern Front, claimed in an unknown number of combat missions. Mathews and Foreman, authors of Luftwaffe Aces — Biographies and Victory Claims, researched the German Federal Archives and found records for 88 aerial victories, four of his aerial victories were claimed on the Western Front, the others on the Eastern Front.

Victory claims were logged to a map-reference (PQ = Planquadrat), for example "PQ 35 Ost 49147". The Luftwaffe grid map (Jägermeldenetz) covered all of Europe, western Russia and North Africa and was composed of rectangles measuring 15 minutes of latitude by 30 minutes of longitude, an area of about 360 square miles (930 km^{2}). These sectors were then subdivided into 36 smaller units to give a location area 3 km × 4 km (1.9 mi × 2.5 mi) in size.

Chronicle of aerial victories
This and the ♠ (Ace of spades) indicates those aerial victories which made Schentke an "ace-in-a-day", a term which designates a fighter pilot who has shot down five or more airplanes in one day. This and the ! (exclamation mark) indicates those aerial victories listed by Mathews and Foreman and by Prien, Stemmer, Rodeike and Bock. This and the # (hash mark) indicates those aerial victories listed in the 1996 and 2002 books by Prien and Stemmer. This and the ? (question mark) indicates information discrepancies listed by Prien, Stemmer, Rodeike, Bock, Mathews and Foreman.
Claim!	Claim#	Date	Time	Type	Location	Claim!	Claim#	Date	Time	Type	Location
– 9. Staffel of Jagdgeschwader 3 – Battle of France — 10 May – 25 June 1940
1	1	8 June 1940	17:53	Blenheim	Abbéville						
– 9. Staffel of Jagdgeschwader 3 – At the Channel and over England — 26 June 1940 – 9 June 1941
2	2	7 September 1940	17:55	Spitfire		4		15 May 1941	20:55	Hurricane	Cap Gris-Nez
3	3	1 December 1940	14:42	Spitfire							
– 9. Staffel of Jagdgeschwader 3 – Operation Barbarossa — 22 June – 6 November 1941
5	5	24 June 1941	15:15	I-15		20♠	18	12 July 1941	10:32	DB-3	
6	6	29 June 1941	14:40	V-11 (Il-2)		21♠	19	12 July 1941	13:06	V-11 (Il-2)	
7	7	29 June 1941	17:40	PZL.37		22	20	14 July 1941	07:04	I-16	Kiev
8	8	30 June 1941	07:27	I-16		23	21	15 July 1941	12:51	DB-3	
9	9	30 June 1941	07:30	I-16		24	22	15 July 1941	12:55	DB-3	
10	10	30 June 1941	15:05	DB-3			23	16 July 1941	12:20	I-153	
11	11	30 June 1941	15:06	DB-3			24	16 July 1941	12:24	I-153	
12		4 July 1941	09:35	V-11 (Il-2)	southwest of Hoszezag	25	25	16 July 1941	16:00	I-16	
13	12	8 July 1941	17:16	SB-2		26		16 July 1941	16:00? (Note: According to Mathews and Foreman claimed at 16:12.)	DB-3	15 km (9.3 mi) east of Koziatyn
14	13	10 July 1941	09:10	V-11 (Il-2)		27	26	23 July 1941	17:25	DB-3	
15	14	10 July 1941	12:39	SB-2		28	27	23 July 1941	17:32	DB-3	
16	15	11 July 1941	18:00	SB-2		29	28	5 August 1941	18:00	I-16	
17♠		12 July 1941	10:26	DB-3	11 km (6.8 mi) southeast of Motyzhyn	30	29	9 August 1941	08:10	DB-3	
18♠	16	12 July 1941	10:27	DB-3		31	30	10 August 1941	08:02	I-153	
19♠	17	12 July 1941	10:27	DB-3							
– 9. Staffel of Jagdgeschwader 3 "Udet" – Eastern Front — 10 February – 14 April 1942
32	31	18 February 1942	16:10	I-61 (MiG-3)		39	38	20 March 1942	14:55	Pe-2	
33	32	19 February 1942	16:40	I-61 (MiG-3)		40	39	22 March 1942	13:10	Il-2	
34	33	28 February 1942	09:12	I-16		41	40	4 April 1942	16:04	I-301 (LaGG-3)	
35	34	28 February 1942	09:13	I-16		42	41	4 April 1942	16:11	I-301 (LaGG-3)	
36	35	12 March 1942	16:52	I-61 (MiG-3)			42	5 April 1942	16:15	unknown	
37	36	16 March 1942	10:55	I-301 (LaGG-3)		43	43	6 April 1942	14:10	MiG-3	
38	37	17 March 1942	09:50	I-301 (LaGG-3)		44		6 April 1942	14:14	MiG-3	4 km (2.5 mi) east of Parfino
– 9. Staffel of Jagdgeschwader 3 "Udet" – Eastern Front — 19 May – July 1942
45	44	19 May 1942	10:02	I-61 (MiG-3)	20 km (12 mi) southwest of Stary Saltov	58	58	5 July 1942	03:16	Il-2	Voronezh
46	45	22 May 1942	09:36? (Note: According to the 1996 book by Prien and Stemmer claimed at 09:35.)	I-61 (MiG-3)	15 km (9.3 mi) southeast of Stary Saltov	59	59	5 July 1942	03:18	Il-2	Voronezh
47	46	22 May 1942	09:42? (Note: According to the 1996 book by Prien and Stemmer claimed at 09:38.)	I-61 (MiG-3)	20 km (12 mi) southeast of Stary Saltov	60	60	7 July 1942	03:00	MiG-1	
48		22 May 1942	09:46	I-61 (MiG-3)	20 km (12 mi) east of Stary Saltov	61	61	7 July 1942	03:03	MiG-1	Nowo-Uschman
49	47	23 May 1942	05:36	Il-2	north of Ternowaja	62	62	7 July 1942	03:40	Il-2	Maslovka
50	48	23 May 1942	05:40	MiG-1		63	63	7 July 1942	03:56	Il-2	Voronezh
51	49	26 May 1942	16:07	Pe-2		64	64	9 July 1942	11:17	Il-2	Voronezh
52	50	26 May 1942	16:10	Pe-2		65	65	9 July 1942	11:22	Il-2	north of Voronezh
	51	26 May 1942	18:55	MiG-1		66	66	9 July 1942	11:24	Il-2	north of Voronezh
53	52	27 May 1942	06:20	R-10 (Seversky)		67	67	9 July 1942	19:36	LaGG-3	north of Voronezh
	53	27 May 1942	16:00	unknown		68	68	11 July 1942	09:58	Boston	
54	54	29 May 1942	10:25	R-10 (Seversky)		69	69	16 July 1942	17:20	Pe-2	
55	55	26 June 1942	04:35	Pe-2	30 km (19 mi) southeast of Shchigry	70	70	16 July 1942	17:21	Pe-2	
56	56	1 July 1942	10:13	MiG-1		71	71	16 July 1942	17:22	Pe-2	
57	57	5 July 1942	03:15	LaGG-3	Voronezh						
– 2. Staffel of Jagdgeschwader 3 "Udet" – Eastern Front, Stalingrad — December 1942
	72	1 December 1942	08:45	unknown		82♠	81♠	12 December 1942	13:33	LaGG-3? (Note: According to the 2002 book by Prien and Stemmer claimed as an unknown aircraft type.)	PQ 35 Ost 49354; 20 km (12 mi) south of Bassargino (Note: A makeshift airfield southwest of Pitomnik Airfield.)
72		8 December 1942	10:15	Il-2	PQ 35 Ost 49147; 10 km (6.2 mi) north-east of Pitomnik Airfield	83♠	82♠	12 December 1942	13:41	LaGG-3?	PQ 35 Ost 49342 vicinity of Stalingrad
73		8 December 1942	12:45	La-5	PQ 35 Ost 49324 vicinity of Bassargino	84	83	13 December 1942	13:30	LaGG-3?	PQ 35 Ost 44323 vicinity of Bassargino
74	73	9 December 1942	07:20	Il-2	10 km (6.2 mi) east-northeast of Gratschij; 5 km (3.1 mi) north of Gorodishche	85	84	17 December 1942	10:00	LaGG-3?	PQ 35 Ost 49213; 15 km (9.3 mi) northeast of Gorodishche
75	74	10 December 1942	08:30	MiG-1	west of Kotluban train station west of Pitomnik Airfield	86		17 December 1942	13:18	LaGG-3	PQ 35 Ost 49161 north of Konnaja railroad
76	75	10 December 1942	08:40	Il-2? (Note: According to the 2002 book by Prien and Stemmer claimed as a Mikoyan-Gurevich MiG-1.)	4 km (2.5 mi) east of Kotluban train station 5 km (3.1 mi) north of Gorodishche	87	85	18 December 1942	07:32	Pe-2?	PQ 35 Ost 49261; 35 km (22 mi) east of Stalingrad
77	76	10 December 1942	08:47	MiG-1	5 km (3.1 mi) north of Gorodischtsche vicinity of Gorodishche		86	18 December 1942	07:40	unknown	
78♠	77♠	12 December 1942	06:57	Il-2?	PQ 35 Ost 49349 vicinity of Stalingrad		87	18 December 1942	09:35	unknown	
79♠	78♠	12 December 1942	08:39	La-5?	PQ 35 Ost 49343 vicinity of Stalingrad		88	23 December 1942	—	Il-2	
80♠	79♠	12 December 1942	11:55	La-5?	5 km (3.1 mi) south-south-east Karpovka	88	89	25 December 1942	13:50	Pe-2?	PQ 35 Ost 4078
81♠	80♠	12 December 1942	12:10	Il-2?	PQ 35 Ost 49331 vicinity of Stalingrad						

=== Awards ===
- Iron Cross (1939) 2nd and 1st Class
- Knight's Cross of the Iron Cross on 4 September 1941 as Oberfeldwebel and pilot in the 9./Jagdgeschwader 3
- German Cross in Gold on 24 September 1942 as Oberfeldwebel in the 9./Jagdgeschwader 3
