= List of county flags in the Lubusz Voivodeship =

Counties (powiat) in Lubusz Voivodeship, Poland have symbols in the form of flags.

Flag of the Lubusz Voivodeship

A flag is a sheet of fabric of a specific shape, colour and meaning, attached to a spar or mast. It may also include the coat of arms or emblem of the administrative unit it represents. In Poland, territorial units (municipal, city, and county councils) may establish flags in accordance with the Act of 21 December 1978 on badges and uniforms. In its original version, the act only allowed territorial units to establish coats of arms. It was not until the "Act of 29 December 1998 amending certain acts in connection with the implementation of the state system reform" that the right for provinces, counties, and municipalities to establish a flag as the symbol of their territorial unit was officially confirmed. This change benefited powiats, which were reinstated in 1999.

== List of county flags ==
=== Cities with county rights ===
| County | Flag | Description |
|---|---|---|
| City of Gorzów Wielkopolski | | The city's flag was established on 6 May 1901, again on 29 December 1994. It is a rectangular flag with proportions of 6:11, divided into three equal horizontal stripes: green, white and red. In central part of the flag it may bear the city coat of arms. |
| City of Zielona Góra | | The city's flag was established on 16 September 1965. It is a rectangular flag with proportions of 5:8, divided into two parts in the ratio of 1:2 - left side, yellow in colour and right, divided into two equal horizontal stripes: white and green. |

=== Powiaty ===
| County | Flag | Description |
|---|---|---|
| Powiat gorzowski | | The first version of the municipality's flag was established by Resolution No. 93/XII/2000 of 16 February 2000; the current version, designed by Kamil Wójcikowski and Robert Fidura, was established by Resolution No. 92/XV/2016 of 29 June 2016. It is a rectangular flag with proportions of 5:8, red in colour, in the central part of which the emblem from the county coat of arms is displayed. |
| Powiat krośnieński | | The county flag was established by Resolution No. XVIII/91/2000 of 27 September 2000. It is a rectangular flag with proportions of 1:2, divided into three equal horizontal stripes: blue, white and green. |
| Powiat międzyrzecki | | The county flag was established by Resolution No. XLIX/324/10 of 28 September 2010. It is a rectangular flag with proportions 5:8, red in colour, divided by two white wavy lines placed 1/8 from the edge of the flag. To the left is the emblem from the county coat of arms. |
| Powiat nowosolski | | The county flag was established by the Resolution No. XXXIV/211/2002 of 20 February 2002. It is a rectangular piece of cloth with proportions of 3:5, divided into four vertical stripes: yellow, black, white and blue in the ratio of 2:1:1:2. In its central part of the flag the county coat of arms may be displayed. |
| Powiat słubicki | | The first version of the county flag was established by Resolution No. XVII/63/2000 of 30 May 2000, the current version, designed by Alfred Znamierowski, was established by Resolution No. XLVI/222/17 of 28 December 2017. It is a rectangular flag, divided into three horizontal stripes: red, white and blue in a ratio of 3:1:1. In the central part of the red stripe the county coat of arms may be displayed. |
| Powiat strzelecko-drezdenecki | | The county flag, designed by Tadeusz Feder, was established on 20 December 1999. It is a rectangular flag with proportions of 5:8, divided into three equal horizontal stripes: red, blue and white. |
| Powiat sulęciński | | The county flag was established by Resolution No. XIV/90/03 of 17 December 2003. It is a rectangular piece of cloth with proportions of 5:8, divided in a cross into four parts: two black and two yellow (the canton is black). The flag may display symbols from the county coat of arms. |
| Powiat świebodziński | | The county flag was established by Resolution No. VII/35/99 of 15 July 1999. It is a rectangular flag with proportions of 5:8, divided in a cross into four parts: two yellow and two red (the canton is yellow). |
| Powiat wschowski | | The county flag was established by Resolution No. XVII/85/2004 of 25 February 2004. It is a rectangular flag with proportions of 5:8, divided into four equal vertical stripes: white, blue, yellow and black. In the central part of the flag the county coat of arms may be displayed. |
| Powiat zielonogórski | | The county flag was established by Resolution No. XIII/112/2000 of 29 June 2000. It is a rectangular flag with proportions of 5:8, yellow in colour, divided by three parallel diagonal stripes: two blue and one green. |
| Powiat żagański | | The county flag was established by Resolution No. IX/3/2003 of 30 June 2003. It is a rectangular flag with proportions of 5:8, divided into three horizontal stripes: silver, red and gold in the ratio of 1:6:1, In the central part of the flag the county coat of arms may be displayed. |
| Powiat żarski | | The county flag is a rectangular flag with proportions of 5:8, yellow in colour, divided at the right oblique angle by a red-white stripe. In the central part the county coat of arms may be displayed. |

== See also ==
- List of municipal flags in the Lubusz Voivodeship
