= Rogi, Lubusz Voivodeship =

Rogi
- Village
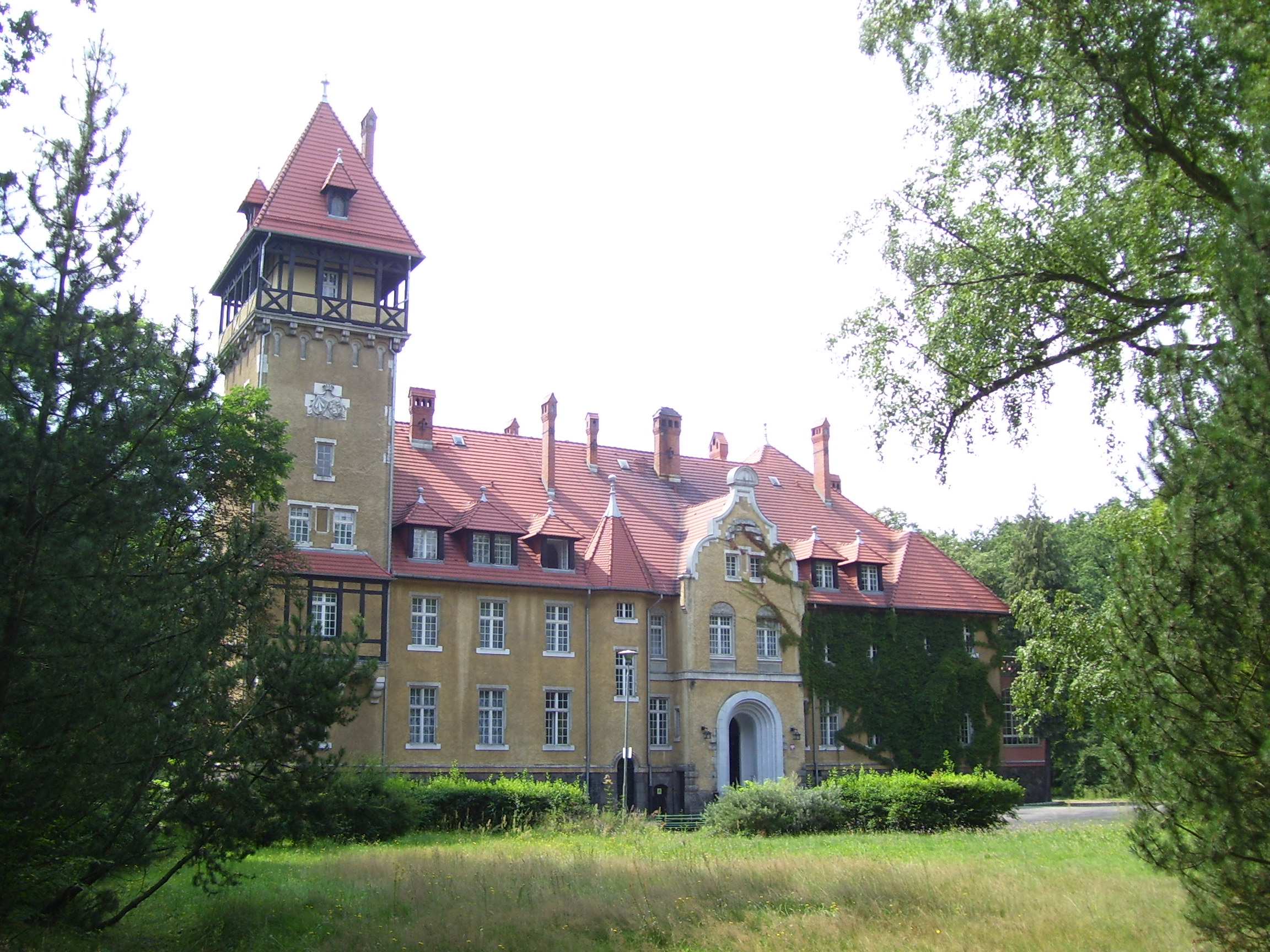
- Palace

- Location within Poland
- Coordinates: 52°33′51″N 15°10′35″E
- Country: Poland
- Voivodeship: Lubusz
- County: Sulęcin
- Gmina: Lubniewice
- Population: 70

Rogi [ˈrɔɡi] is a village in the administrative district of Gmina Lubniewice, within Sulęcin County, Lubusz Voivodeship, in western Poland.
