= Zaszczytowo =

- Village
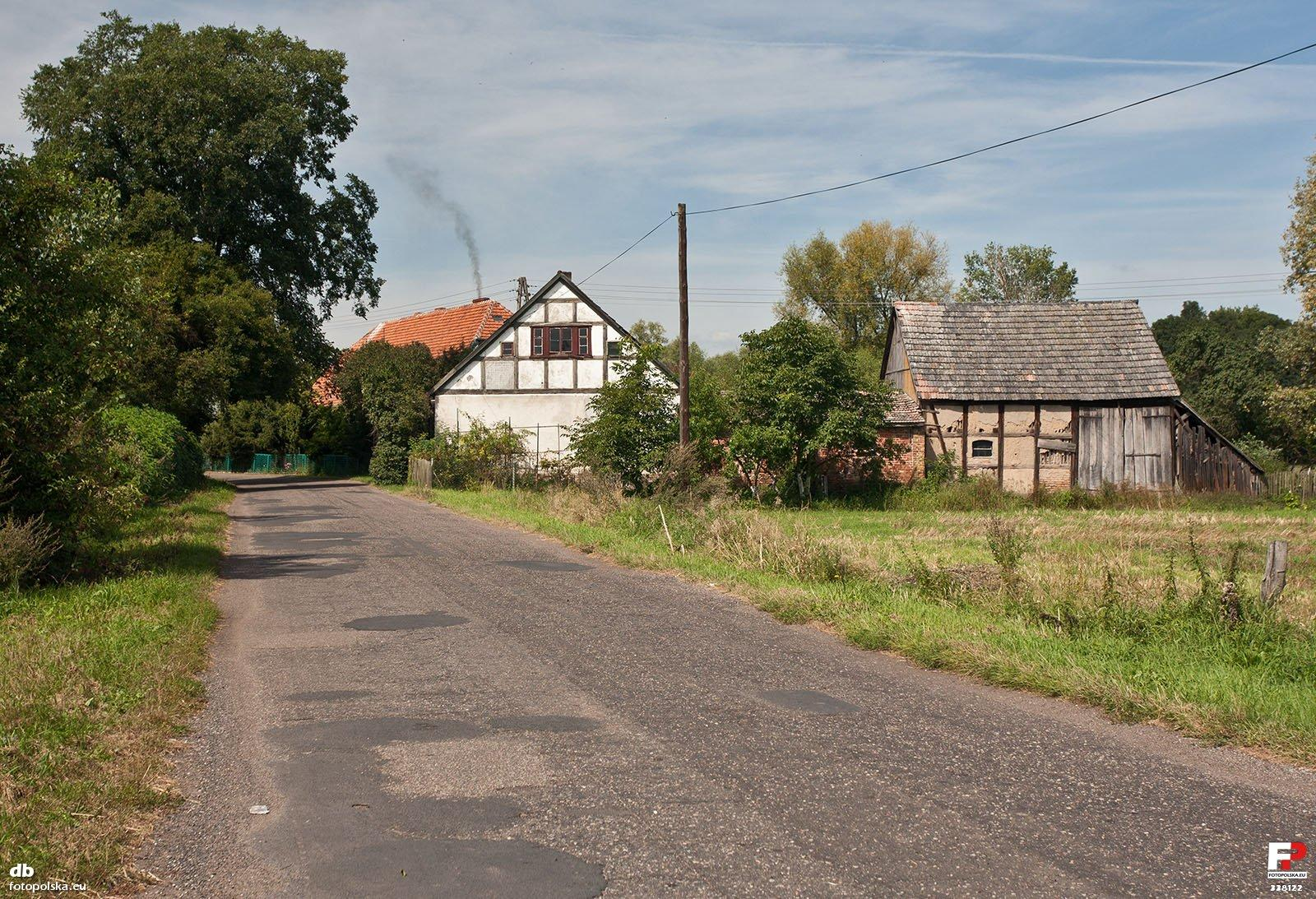

- Location within Poland
- Coordinates: 52°37′12″N 14°57′50″E
- Country: Poland
- Voivodeship: Lubusz
- County: Sulęcin
- Gmina: Krzeszyce
- Population: 160

Zaszczytowo [zaʂt͡ʂɨˈtɔvɔ] is a village in the administrative district of Gmina Krzeszyce, within Sulęcin County, Lubusz Voivodeship, in western Poland.
