= Brzozówka, Lubusz Voivodeship =

Settlement in Lubusz Voivodeship, Poland

Brzozówka
- Settlement
- Location within Poland
- Coordinates: 52°35′N 15°7′E
- Country: Poland
- Voivodeship: Lubusz
- County: Sulęcin
- Gmina: Krzeszyce

Brzozówka [bʐɔˈzufka] is a settlement in the administrative district of Gmina Krzeszyce, within Sulęcin County, Lubusz Voivodeship, in western Poland.
