= Jeziorki, Lubusz Voivodeship =

Jeziorki
- Village
- Location within Poland
- Coordinates: 52°35′4″N 15°8′19″E
- Country: Poland
- Voivodeship: Lubusz
- County: Sulęcin
- Gmina: Krzeszyce

Jeziorki [jɛˈʑɔrki] is a village in the administrative district of Gmina Krzeszyce, within Sulęcin County, Lubusz Voivodeship, in western Poland.
