= Osieczyce =

- Village
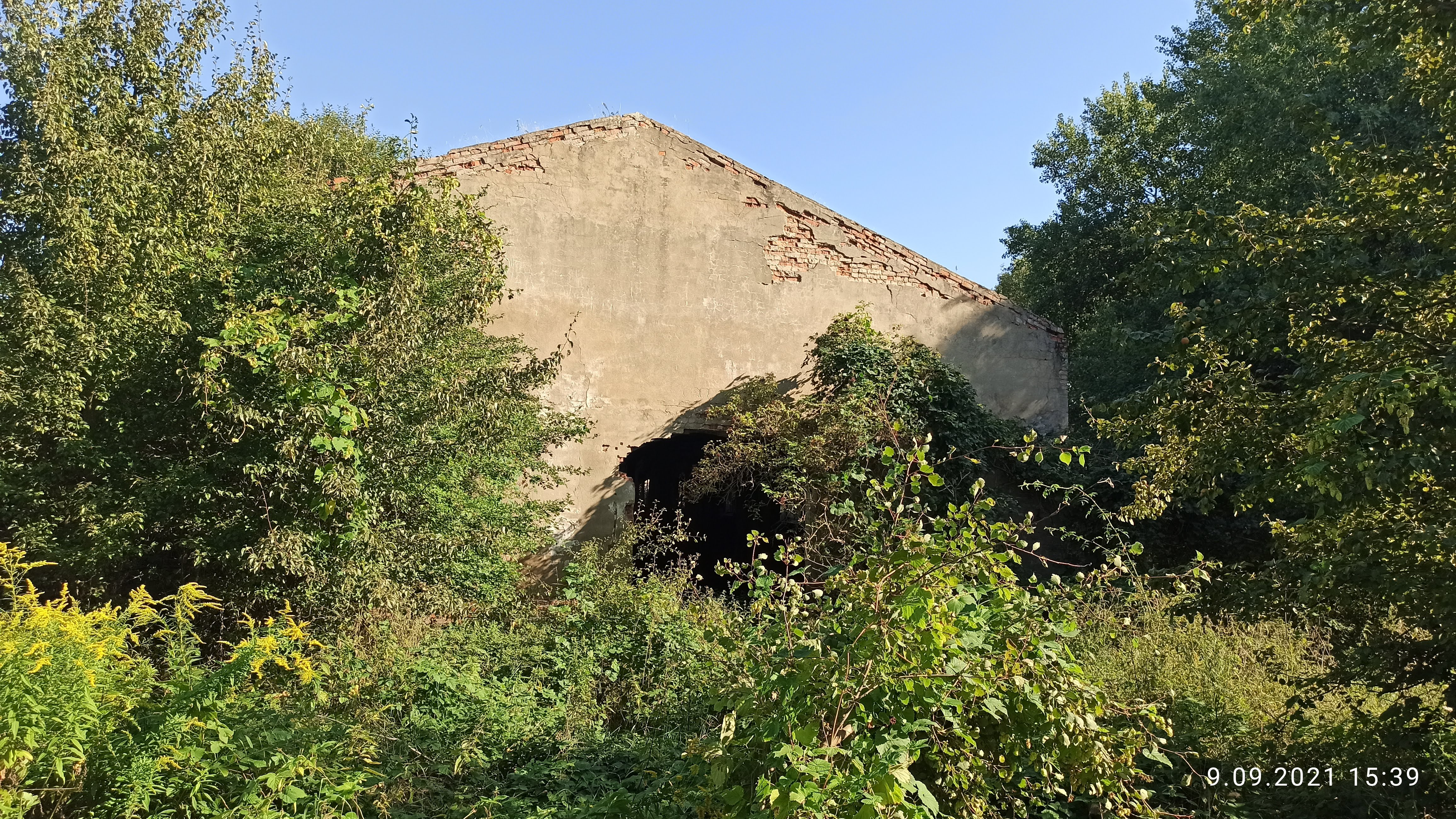

- Location within Poland
- Coordinates: 52°27′43″N 15°16′48″E
- Country: Poland
- Voivodeship: Lubusz
- County: Sulęcin
- Gmina: Lubniewice
- Population: 10

Osieczyce [ɔɕɛˈt͡ʂɨt͡sɛ] is an abandoned settlement in the administrative district of Gmina Lubniewice, part of Sulęcin County, Lubusz Voivodeship, in western Poland.
