= Marianki, Sulęcin County =

Marianki
- Village
- Location within Poland
- Coordinates: 52°35′N 14°57′E
- Country: Poland
- Voivodeship: Lubusz
- County: Sulęcin
- Gmina: Krzeszyce
- Population: 70

Marianki [maˈrjanki] is a village in the administrative district of Gmina Krzeszyce, within Sulęcin County, Lubusz Voivodeship, in western Poland.
