= Glisno, Gmina Lubniewice =

Glisno
- Village
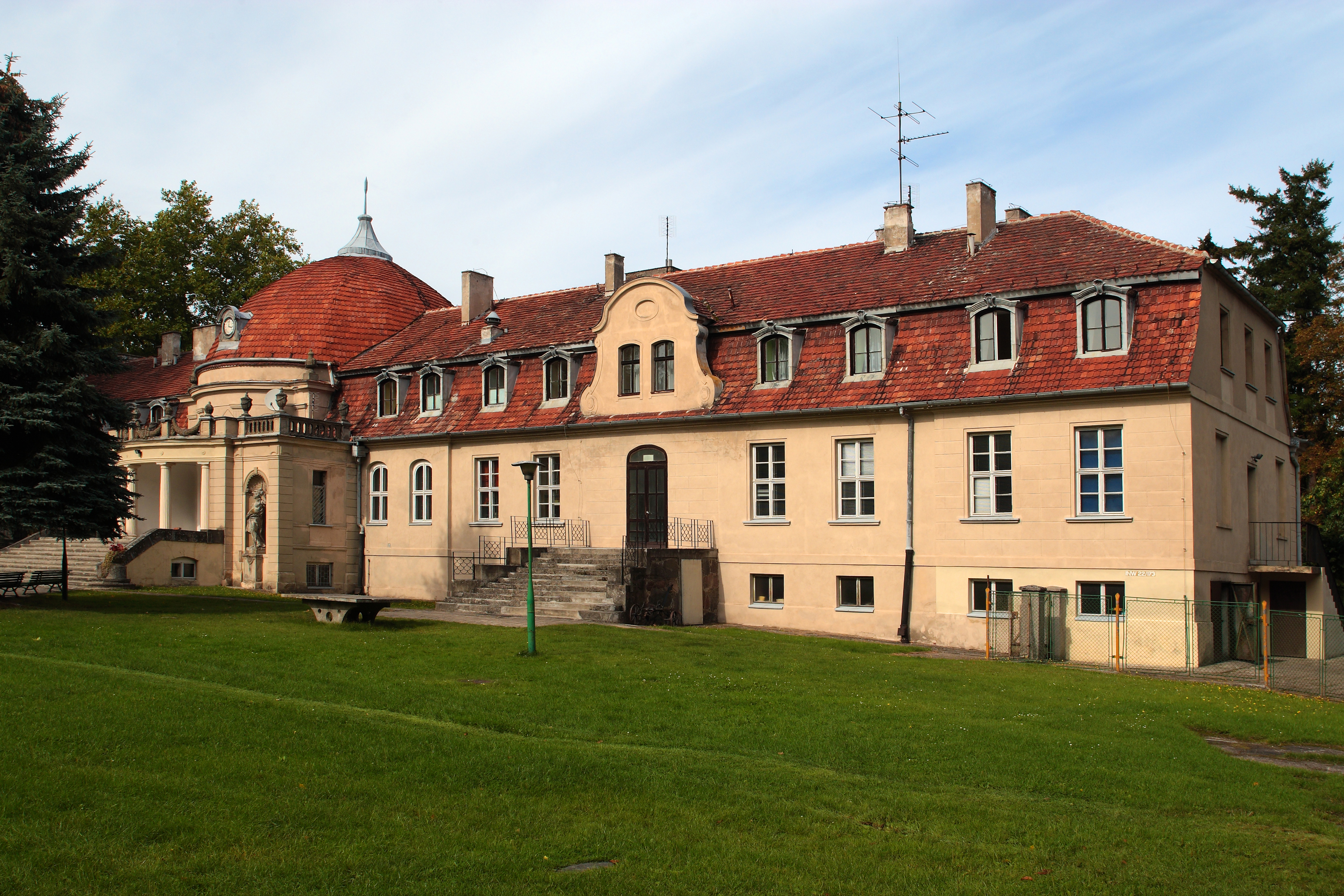
- Palace in Glisno

- Location within Poland
- Coordinates: 52°27′18″N 15°13′36″E
- Country: Poland
- Voivodeship: Lubusz
- County: Sulęcin
- Gmina: Lubniewice

Glisno [ˈɡlisnɔ] is a village in the administrative district of Gmina Lubniewice, within Sulęcin County, Lubusz Voivodeship, in western Poland.
