= Łąków =

- Village
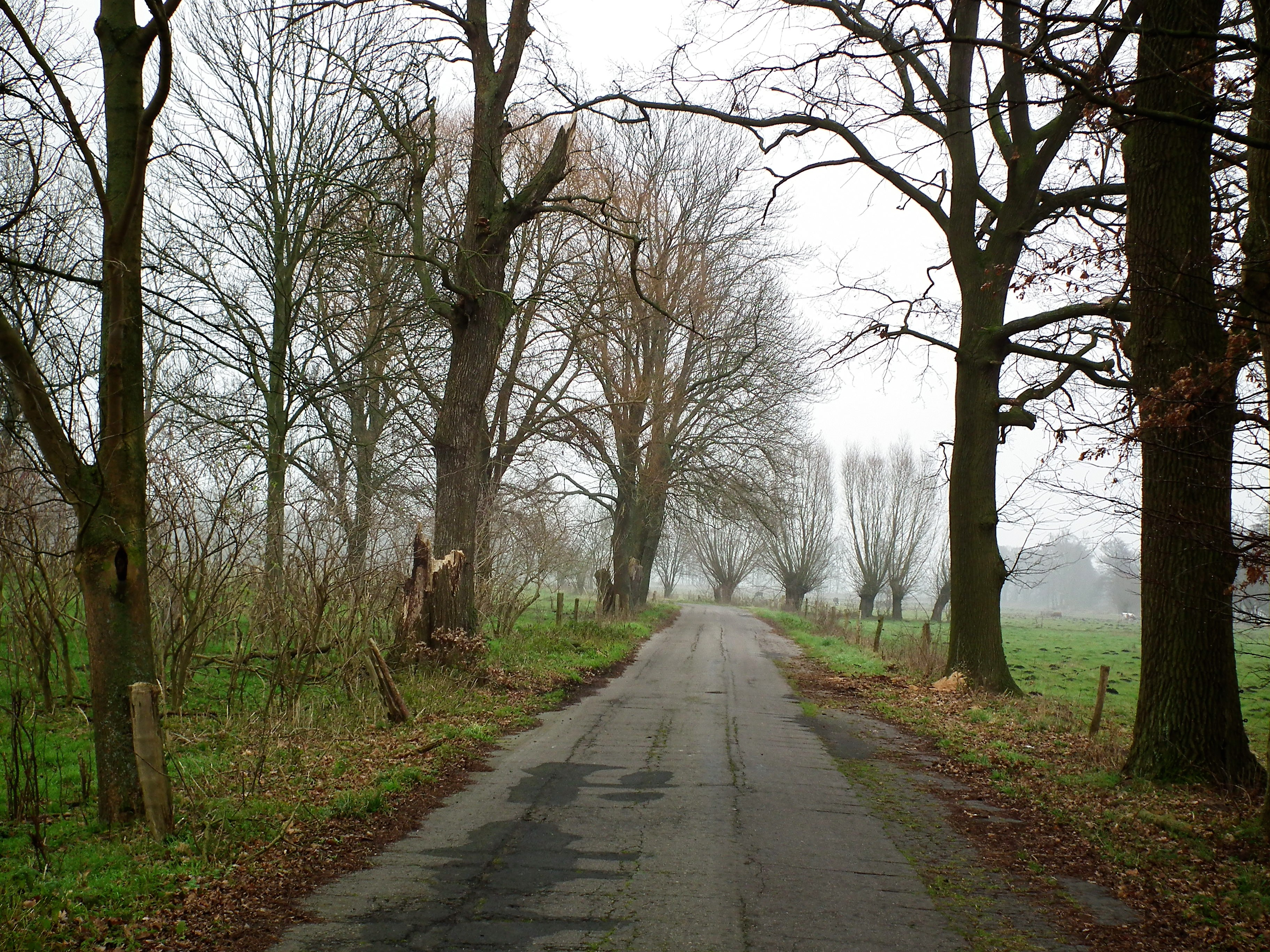

- Location within Poland
- Coordinates: 52°37′N 15°10′E
- Country: Poland
- Voivodeship: Lubusz
- County: Sulęcin
- Gmina: Krzeszyce

Łąków [ˈwɔnkuf] is a village in the administrative district of Gmina Krzeszyce, within Sulęcin County, Lubusz Voivodeship, in western Poland.
