= Jarnatów =

- Village
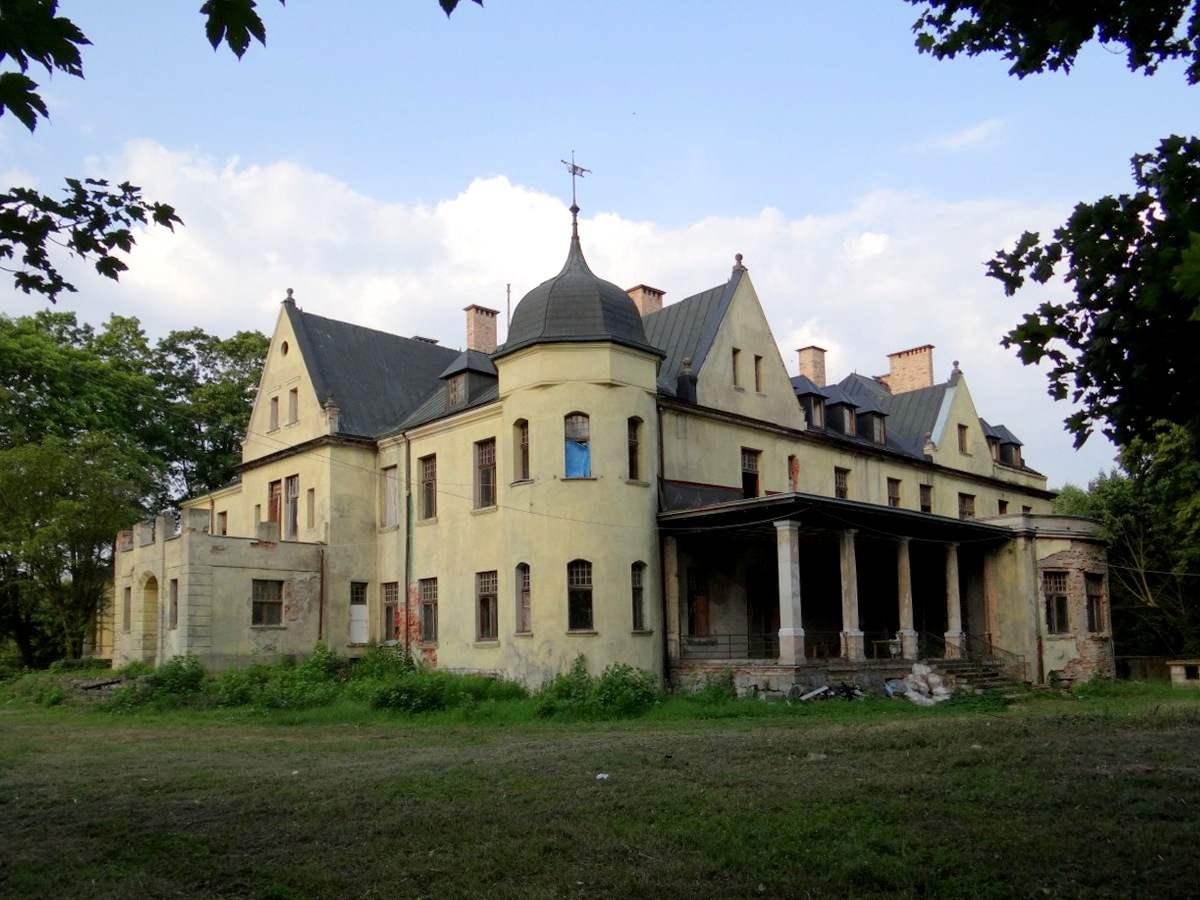
- Palace

- Location within Poland
- Coordinates: 52°31′N 15°10′E
- Country: Poland
- Voivodeship: Lubusz
- County: Sulęcin
- Gmina: Lubniewice

Jarnatów [jarˈnatuf] is a village in the administrative district of Gmina Lubniewice, within Sulęcin County, Lubusz Voivodeship, in western Poland.
