= Rudnicki =

Rudnicki (feminine: Rudnicka; plural: Rudniccy) is a Polish-language toponymic surname derived from one of places named Rudnica. The Ukrainian or Russian-language equivalent is Rudnitsky, Lithuanian: Rudnickis

It may refer to:

- Adolf Rudnicki (1912–1990), Polish essayist
- Icchak Rudnicki, birth name of Yitzhak Arad (1926–2021), Israeli historian, former director of Yad Vashem
- John Rudnicki (born 1951), American professor in engineering
- Klemens Rudnicki (1897–1992), Polish general
- Konrad Rudnicki (1926–2013), Polish astronomer
- Halina Rudnicka (1909–1982), Polish writer
- Lidia Rudnicka (born 1960), Polish-American dermatologist
- Mikołaj Rudnicki (1881–1978), Polish linguist
- Shelley Rudnicki, American politician
- Szymon Rudnicki (born 1938), Polish historian

== See also ==
- Edmond Roudnitska
