= Maszków, Lubusz Voivodeship =

Maszków
- Village
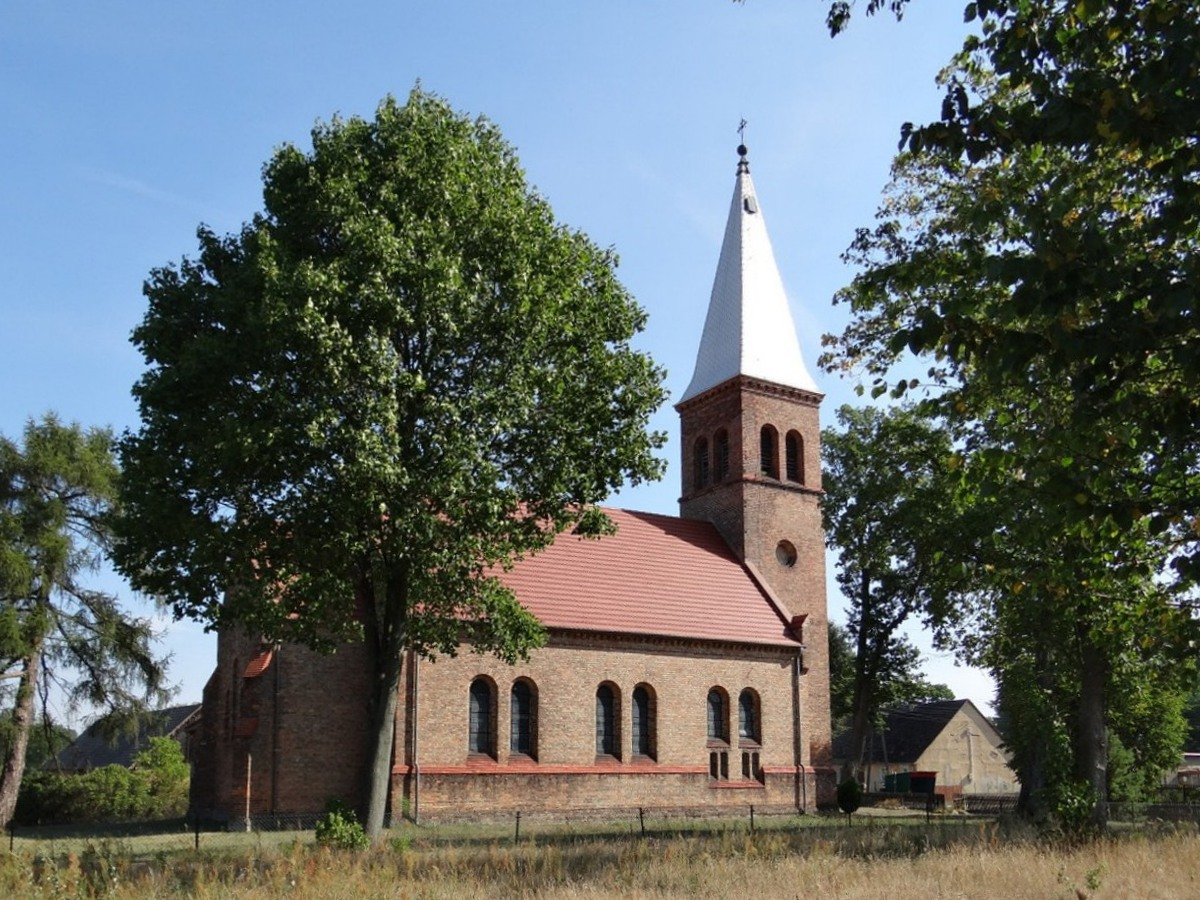
- Catholic church

- Location within Poland
- Coordinates: 52°34′N 15°7′E
- Country: Poland
- Voivodeship: Lubusz
- County: Sulęcin
- Gmina: Krzeszyce
- Population: 90

Maszków [ˈmaʂkuf] is a village in the administrative district of Gmina Krzeszyce, within Sulęcin County, Lubusz Voivodeship, in western Poland.
