= Krasnołęg =

- Village
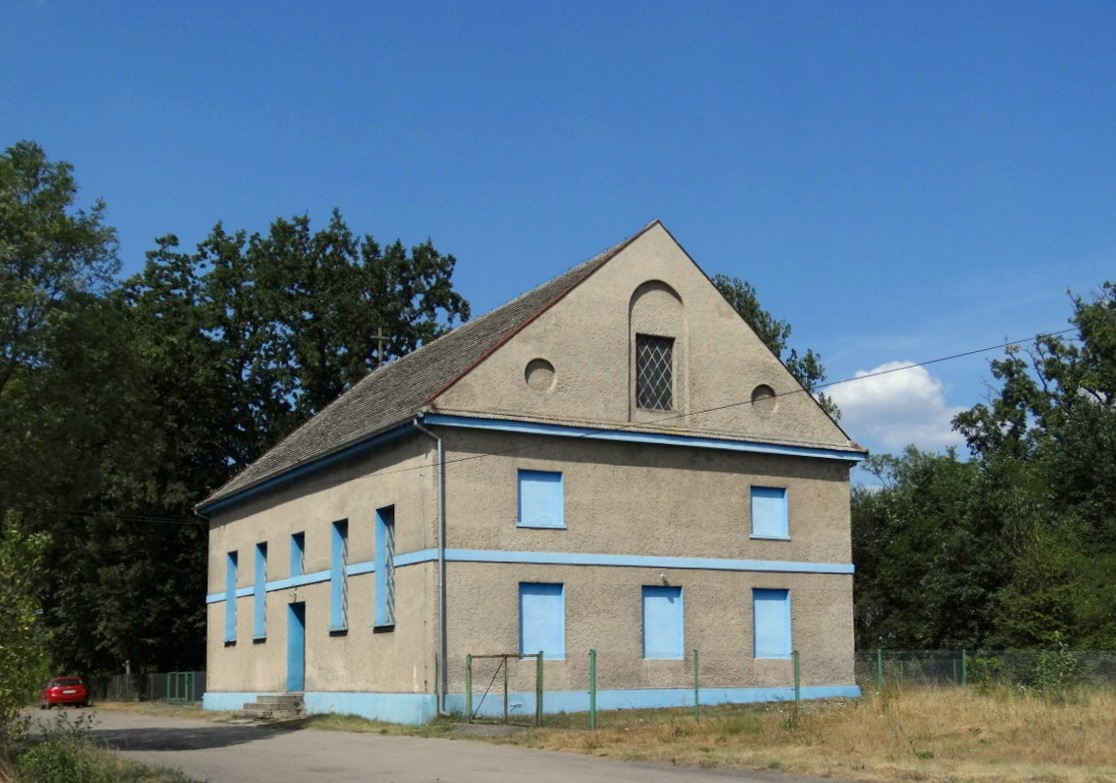
- Catholic church

- Location within Poland
- Coordinates: 52°35′N 15°3′E
- Country: Poland
- Voivodeship: Lubusz
- County: Sulęcin
- Gmina: Krzeszyce
- Population: 70

Krasnołęg [krasˈnɔwɛnk] is a village in the administrative district of Gmina Krzeszyce, within Sulęcin County, Lubusz Voivodeship, in western Poland.
