= Rudna, Lubusz Voivodeship =

Rudna
- Village
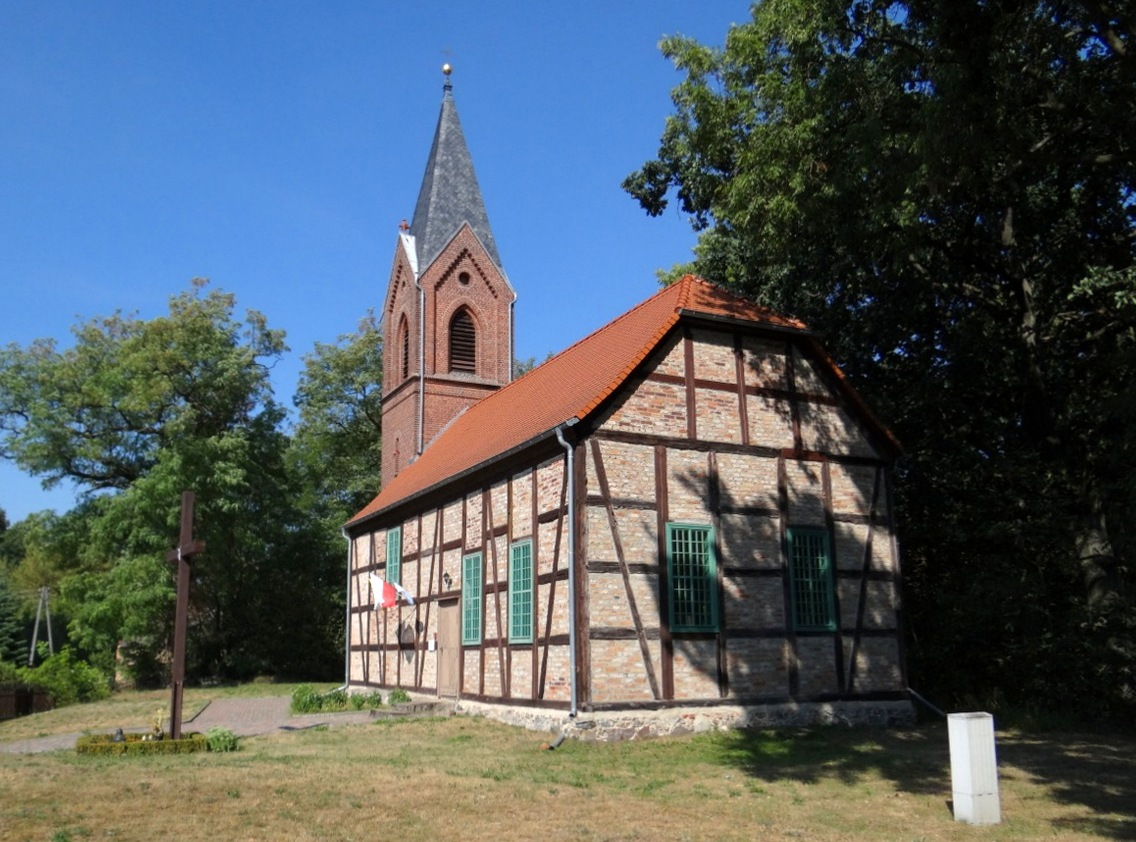
- Catholic church

- Location within Poland
- Coordinates: 52°32′56″N 15°6′56″E
- Country: Poland
- Voivodeship: Lubusz
- County: Sulęcin
- Gmina: Krzeszyce
- Population: 70
- Website: http://www.rudna.net.pl

Rudna [ˈrudna] is a village in the administrative district of Gmina Krzeszyce, within Sulęcin County, Lubusz Voivodeship, in western Poland.
