= Wałdowice =

- Village
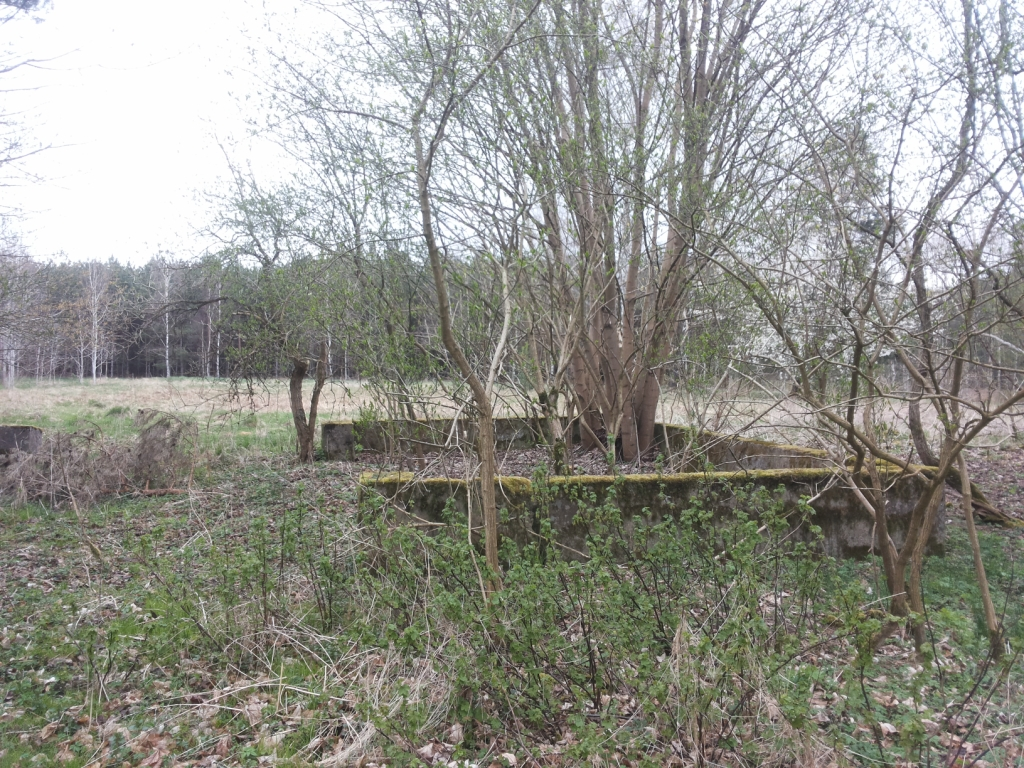

- Location within Poland
- Coordinates: 52°35′N 15°12′E
- Country: Poland
- Voivodeship: Lubusz
- County: Sulęcin
- Gmina: Lubniewice

Wałdowice [vau̯dɔˈvit͡sɛ] is a village in the administrative district of Gmina Lubniewice, within Sulęcin County, Lubusz Voivodeship, in western Poland.
