= Brzozowa, Lubusz Voivodeship =

Brzozowa
- Village
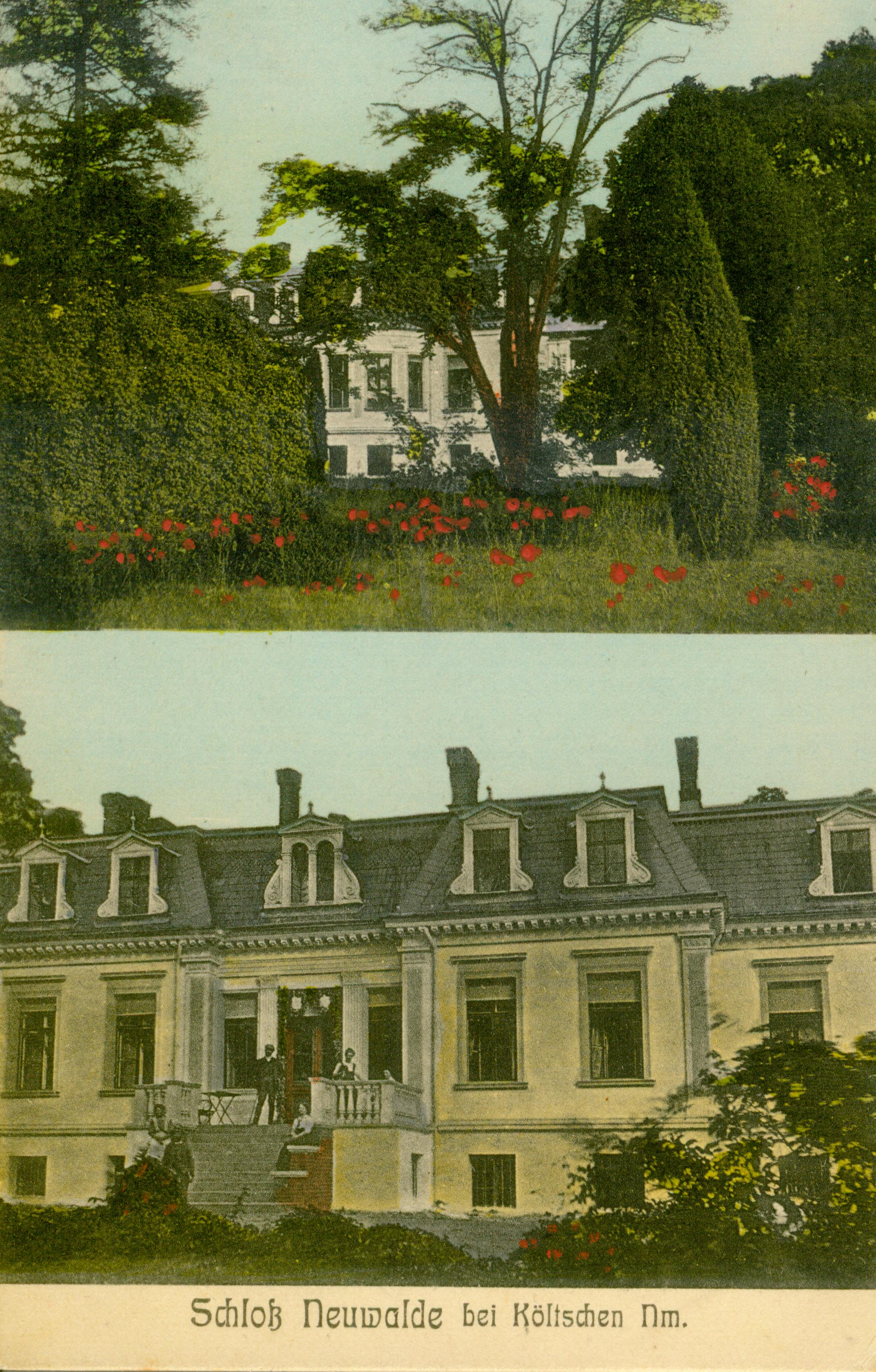

- Location within Poland
- Coordinates: 52°35′N 15°8′E
- Country: Poland
- Voivodeship: Lubusz
- County: Sulęcin
- Gmina: Krzeszyce
- Population: 100

Brzozowa [bʐɔˈzɔva] is a village in the administrative district of Gmina Krzeszyce, within Sulęcin County, Lubusz Voivodeship, in western Poland.
