= Rudnitsky =

Rudnitsky, Rudnytsky, Rudnytskyi, or Rudnitski (feminine: Rudnitskaya or Rudnytska) is a transliteration of the Russian or Ukrainian-language spelling of the Polish toponymic surname Rudnicki or Rudnycki, of places named Rudnica. The surname may refer to:

- Jon Rudnitsky, American actor and comedian
- Maria Rudnitskaya, Russian Soviet realist painter, graphic artist, and art teacher
- Milena Rudnytska, Ukrainian intellectual and politician
- Jaroslav Rudnycky, Ukrainian-Canadian folklorist
- Ivan L. Rudnytsky, Ukrainian-Canadian historian
- Ivan Rudnytskyi, Ukrainian footballer
- Ancestral surname of Paul Rudd (1969-), American actor
