= Rudnica, Lubusz Voivodeship =

Rudnica
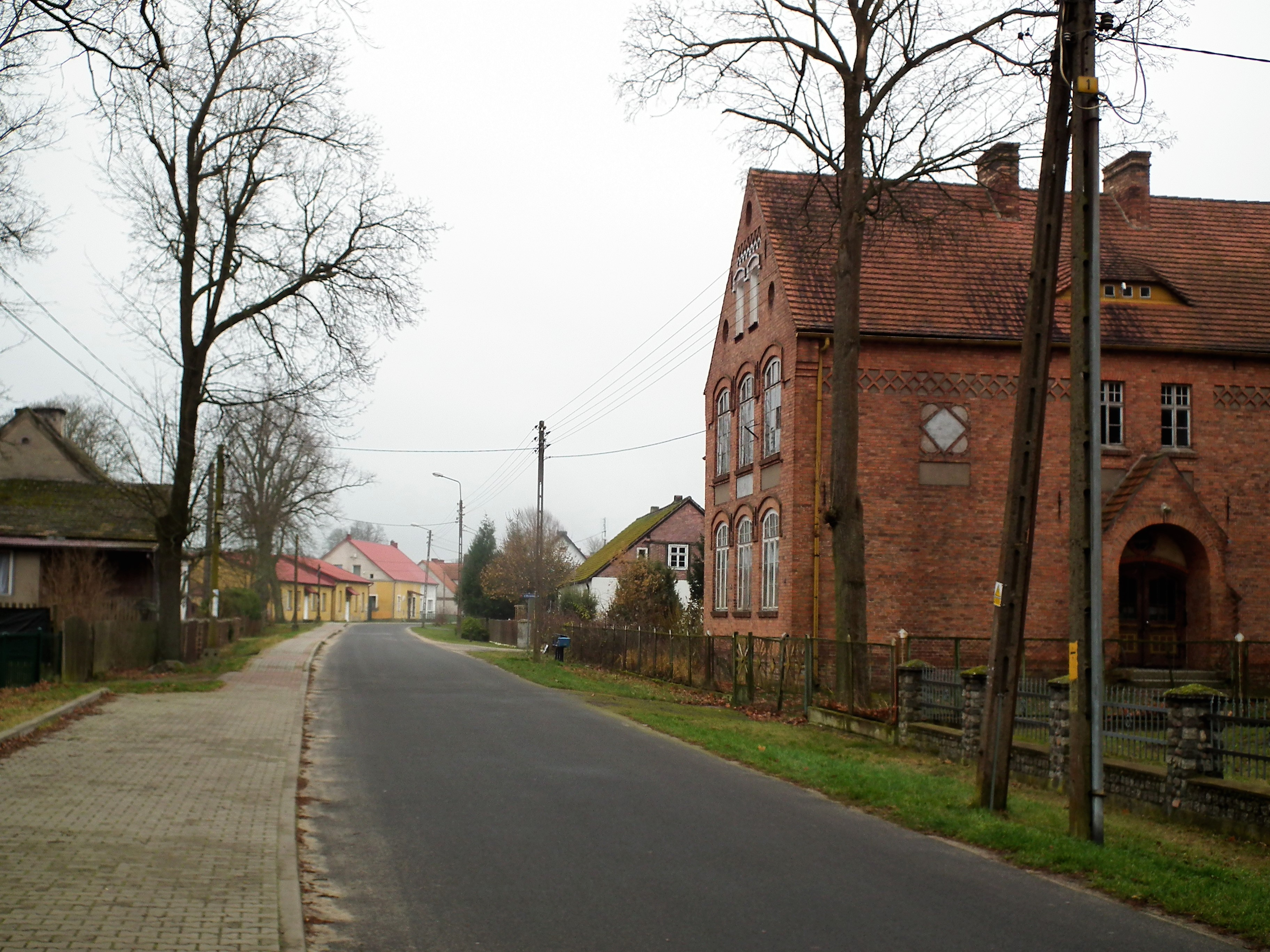

- Location within Poland
- Coordinates: 52°36′N 15°11′E
- Country: Poland
- Voivodeship: Lubusz
- County: Sulęcin
- Gmina: Krzeszyce

Population
  - Total: 395
- Time zone: UTC+1 (CET)
  - Summer (DST): UTC+2 (CEST)
- Postal code: 66-435
- Area code: +4895

Rudnica [Rudˈnit͡sa] is a village in the administrative district of Gmina Krzeszyce, within Sulęcin County, Lubusz Voivodeship, in western Poland.
