= Krzeszyce =

- Village
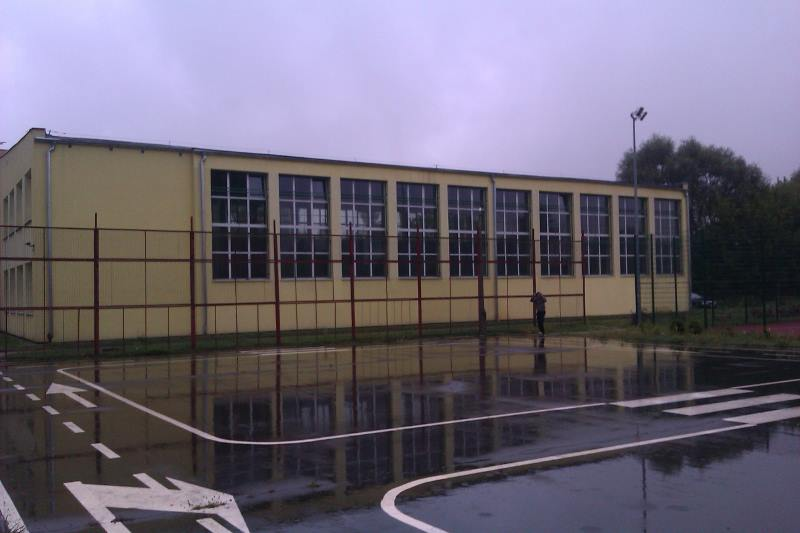
- Sports hall

- Location within Poland
- Coordinates: 52°35′N 15°0′E
- Country: Poland
- Voivodeship: Lubusz
- County: Sulęcin
- Gmina: Krzeszyce
- Population: 1,400

Krzeszyce [kʂɛˈʂɨt͡sɛ] is a village in Sulęcin County, Lubusz Voivodeship, in western Poland. It is the seat of the gmina (administrative district) called Gmina Krzeszyce.

== Notable residents ==
- Georg Schentke (1919–1942), Luftwaffe pilot
