= Flag of Gorzów Wielkopolski =

Polish municipal flag

Gorzów Wielkopolski
- Use: civil flag
- Proportion: 6:11
- Use: state flag 6:11

The civil flag of the city of Gorzów Wielkopolski in Lubusz Voivodeship, Poland is divided into three equally-sized horizontal stripes, of green, white, and red. The first design of the flag was adopted in 1991, and its current version, in 1994.

== Design ==
The civil flag of the city of Gorzów Wielkopolski is divided into three equally-sized horizontal stripes. They are, from top to bottom, green, white, and red. The colours were based on those of the city coat of arms. The proportions of the flag have the aspect ratio of its height to its wight equal 6:11. The state flag depicts the coat of arms of the city, placed in the centre of the civil flag. The coat of arms consists of the white Iberian style escutcheon (shield) with square top and rounded base. In its centre is placed a red eagle with its head facing left, and spread wings, and a red tongue put out. It has yellow (golden) beak, and clows at its legs. The eagle holds a green clover in each of its legs.

== History ==
The city flag used from 1901 to 1945.

The flag was established by the City Council on 6 May 1901. The original design consisted from three equally-sized horizontal stripes. The colours were based on the city coat of arms. They were from top to bottom, red, white, and green. The flag stopped being used in 1945, when the city was transferred to Poland, in the aftermath of World War II. The flag was adopted again by the city on 29 December 1994, with the order of the stripes reversed, to better reflect Polish vexillological tradition.

== See also ==
- coat of arms of Gorzów Wielkopolski
