= Rudnica =

Rudnica may refer to:

== Montenegro ==
- Rudnica, Pljevlja

== Poland ==
- Rudnica, Lower Silesian Voivodeship
- Rudnica, West Pomeranian Voivodeship
- Rudnica, Lubusz Voivodeship

== Serbia ==
- Rudnica (Raška)
- Rudnica (Tutin)

== Slovenia ==
- Rudnica, Slovenia
