= John Rudd =

John Rudd may refer to:

- John Rudd (basketball), NBA player
- John Rudd (cartographer), Tudor map maker
- John Rudd (navy), captain of the USS Lancaster
- John Rudd (rugby player), rugby union player

== See also ==
- Jonathan Rudd (disambiguation)
