= Maslovka, Voronezh Oblast =

Maslovka Масловка
- Selo
- Location within Voronezh Oblast Location within Russia
- Coordinates: 50°59′N 39°45′E
- Country: Russia
- Region: Voronezh Oblast
- District: Liskinsky District
- Time zone: UTC+3:00

Maslovka (Russian: Масловка) is a rural locality (a selo) in Nizhneikoretskoye Rural Settlement, Liskinsky District, Voronezh Oblast, Russia. The population was 234 as of 2010.

== Geography ==
Maslovka is located 24 km east of Liski (the district's administrative centre) by road. Solontsy is the nearest rural locality.
