= Gmina Lubniewice =

Gmina Lubniewice Lubniewice Commune
- Gmina
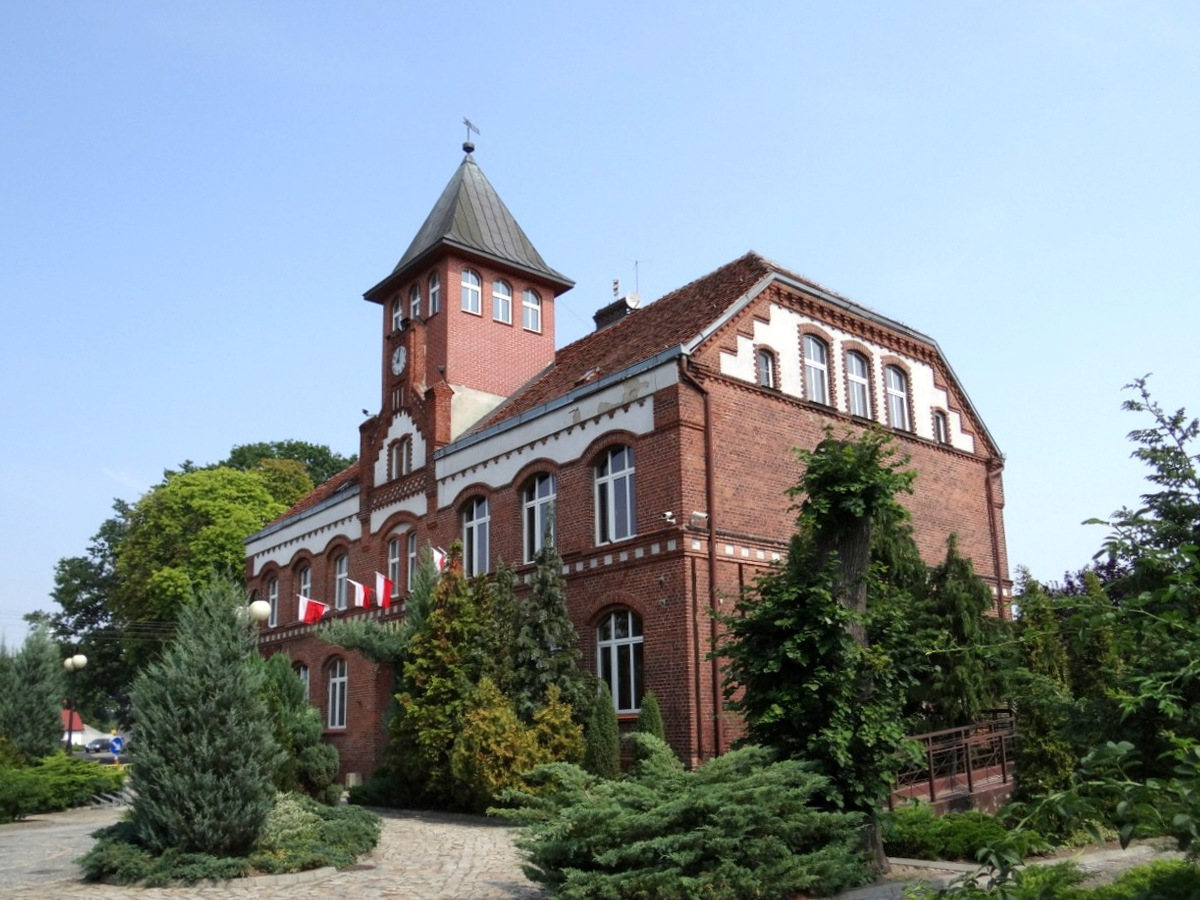
- Town Hall in Lubniewice, seat of the gmina office

- Coat of arms
- Interactive map of Gmina Lubniewice
- Coordinates (Lubniewice): 52°30′59″N 15°14′59″E
- Country: Poland
- Voivodeship: Lubusz
- County: Sulęcin
- Seat: Lubniewice

Area
  - Total: 129.76 km^{2} (50.10 sq mi)

Population (2019-06-30)
  - Total: 3,152
  - Density: 24.29/km^{2} (62.91/sq mi)
  - Urban: 2,059
  - Rural: 1,093
- Time zone: UTC+1 (CET)
  - Summer (DST): UTC+2 (CEST)
- Website: http://www.lubniewice.pl

Gmina Lubniewice is an urban-rural gmina (administrative district) in Sulęcin County, Lubusz Voivodeship, in western Poland. Its seat is the town of Lubniewice, which lies approximately 12 kilometres (7 mi) north-east of Sulęcin, 25 km (16 mi) south of Gorzów Wielkopolski, and 67 km (42 mi) north of Zielona Góra.

The gmina covers an area of 129.76 square kilometres (50.1 sq mi), and as of 2019 its total population is 3,152.

== Villages ==
Apart from the town of Lubniewice, Gmina Lubniewice contains the villages and settlements of Glisno, Jarnatów, Osieczyce (abandoned settlement), Rogi, Sobieraj and Wałdowice.

== Neighbouring gminas ==
Gmina Lubniewice is bordered by the gminas of Bledzew, Deszczno, Krzeszyce and Sulęcin.

== Twin towns – sister cities ==
Gmina Lubniewice is twinned with:

- Sävsjö, Sweden
- Schöneiche bei Berlin, Germany
