= Jonathan Rudd =

Jonathan Rudd may refer to:

- Jonathan Rudd, British politician - see 2012 London Assembly election
- Jonathan Rudd, co-editor of The I Inside
- Jonathan Rudd, a character in the Western film 5 Card Stud

== Jonathon Rudd ==
- Jonathon D. Rudd (1840–1920), American planter, Confederate officer, and politician

== John Rudd ==
- John Rudd (disambiguation)
