= Lubniewice =

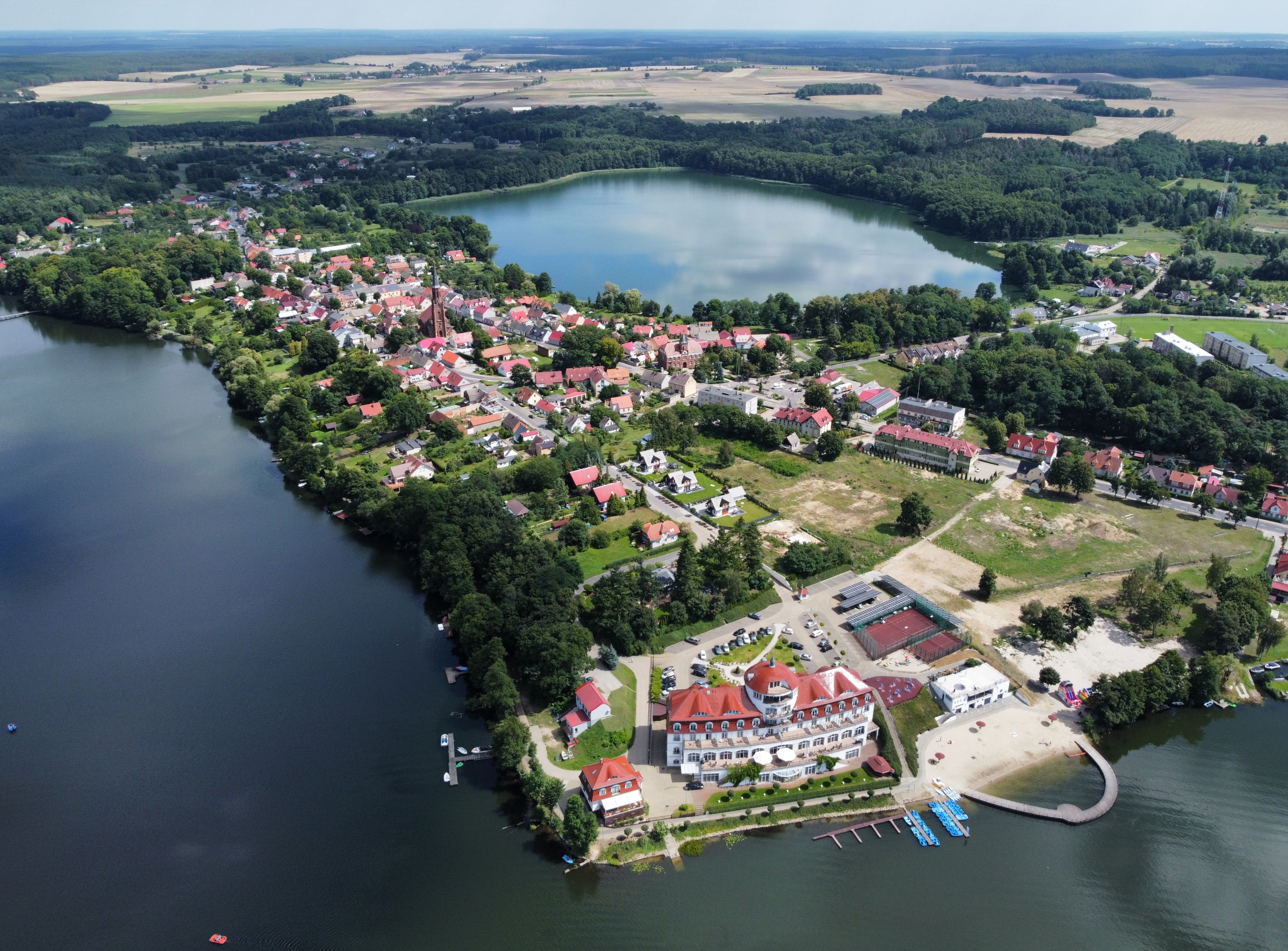

- Coat of arms

- Location within Poland
- Coordinates: 52°30′59″N 15°14′59″E
- Country: Poland
- Voivodeship: Lubusz
- County: Sulęcin
- Gmina: Lubniewice
- First mentioned: 1287

Area
  - Total: 12.11 km^{2} (4.68 sq mi)

Population (2019-06-30)
  - Total: 2,059
  - Density: 170.0/km^{2} (440.4/sq mi)
- Time zone: UTC+1 (CET)
  - Summer (DST): UTC+2 (CEST)
- Postal code: 69-210
- Area code: +48 95
- Vehicle registration: FSU
- Website: http://www.lubniewice.pl

Lubniewice [lubɲɛˈvʲit͡sɛ] (German: Königswalde) is a small town in Sulęcin County, Lubusz Voivodeship, western Poland, with 2,059 inhabitants (2019). It is the administrative seat of Gmina Lubniewice.

== History ==
=== Middle Ages ===
The area formed part of Poland since the establishment of the state in the 10th century. As a result of the fragmentation of Poland, it became part of the Greater Poland province. The first mentioning of the fortress Lubnewiz (Old Polish version of the town's name) dates back to the Greater Polish duke, and future King of Poland, Przemysł II in 1287. Later on it was annexed by the Margraviate of Brandenburg. After a war broke out over control of the region in 1319, the town came under Polish control again, as part of the Duchy of Głogów. Duke Henry IV the Faithful visited the town in 1322. A 1322 deed referred to a nearby settlement of German colonists named Königswalde, established in the course of the Ostsiedlung at the behest of the Brandenburgian margraves. Soon the town fell to Brandenburg again. It was located close to the Imperial border with the Poznań Voivodeship of the Polish Crown in the east. In 1352 the Wittelsbach elector Louis II of Brandenburg enfeoffed his ministeriales of the Waldow noble family with the Königswalde estates. Between 1373 and 1415 it was under Bohemian (Czech) suzerainty.

=== Modern era ===
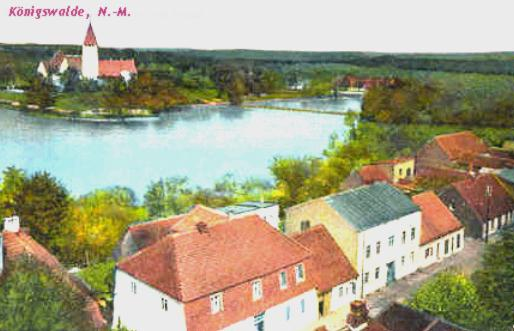
Lubniewice as Königswalde about 1900

From the late 17th century onwards the population increased by the immigration of Polish Brethren and Protestants from Silesia. In 1706 Samuel Crell-Spinowski became minister at the parish church. In the 18th century, clothmaking developed. Poles resisted Germanisation attempts, carried out by the Prussian authorities. After the discovery of the alum deposits in 1751, a mine was established here, which was plundered and destroyed by the Russian army in 1758 during the Seven Years' War. Königswalde received town privileges in 1808 and was incorporated into the Prussian Province of Brandenburg in 1815. From 1871 to 1945 the town was part of Germany. Despite Germanisation policies, in the late 19th century Poles still settled in the town. After World War II and the implementation of the Oder-Neisse line, the town became again part of the Republic of Poland and the German population was expelled in accordance to the Potsdam Agreement. The historic Polish name Lubniewice was restored.

== Demographics ==
Historical population

| Year | Pop. | ±% |
|---|---|---|
| 1843 | 1,333 | — |
| 1871 | 1,400 | +5.0% |
| 1880 | 1,592 | +13.7% |
| 1890 | 1,600 | +0.5% |
| 1900 | 1,440 | −10.0% |

| Year | Pop. | ±% |
|---|---|---|
| 1910 | 1,314 | −8.8% |
| 1925 | 1,568 | +19.3% |
| 1939 | 1,338 | −14.7% |
| 2010 | 1,927 | +44.0% |

== Notable people ==
- Eduard Petzold (1815–1891), landscape gardener

== Twin towns – sister cities ==
See twin towns of Gmina Lubniewice.

== Gallery ==
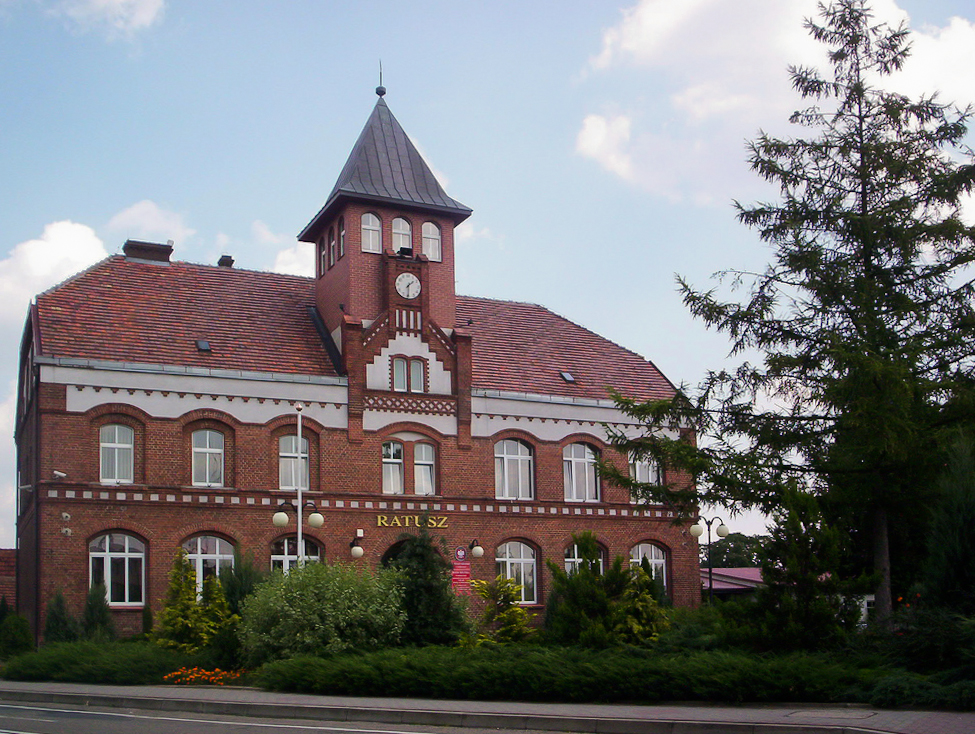
Town Hall (Ratusz)

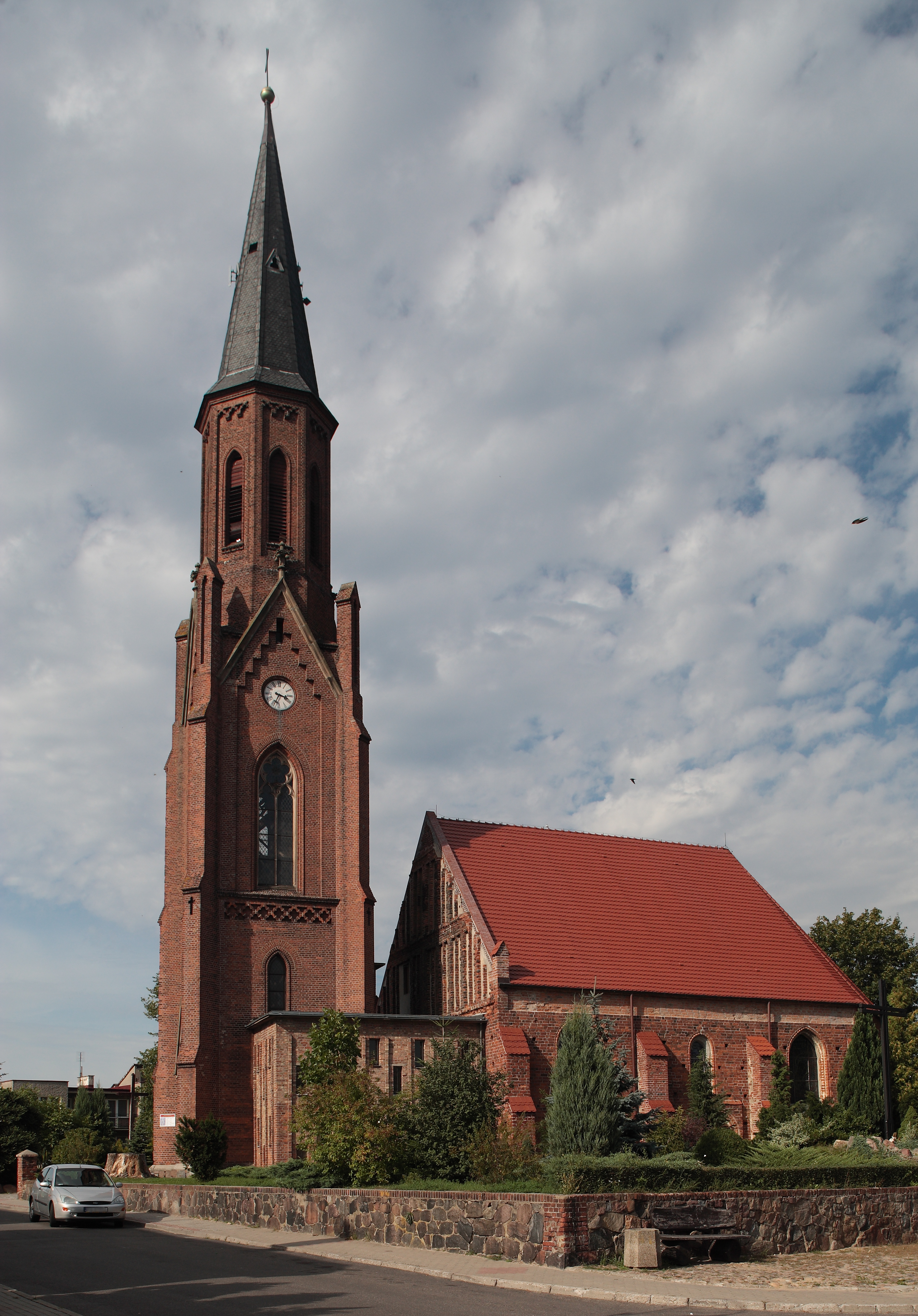
Our Lady of the Rosary church

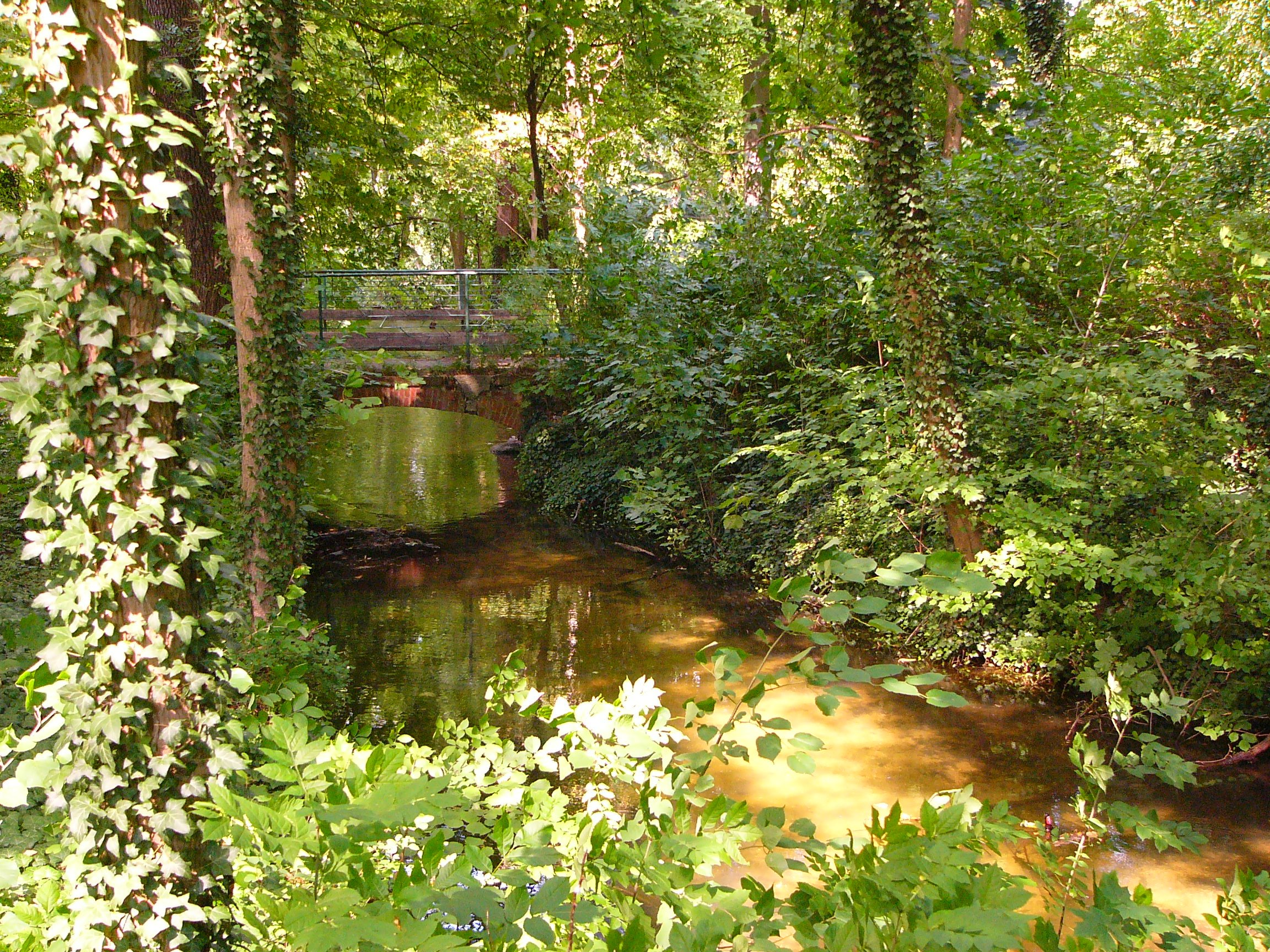
Park

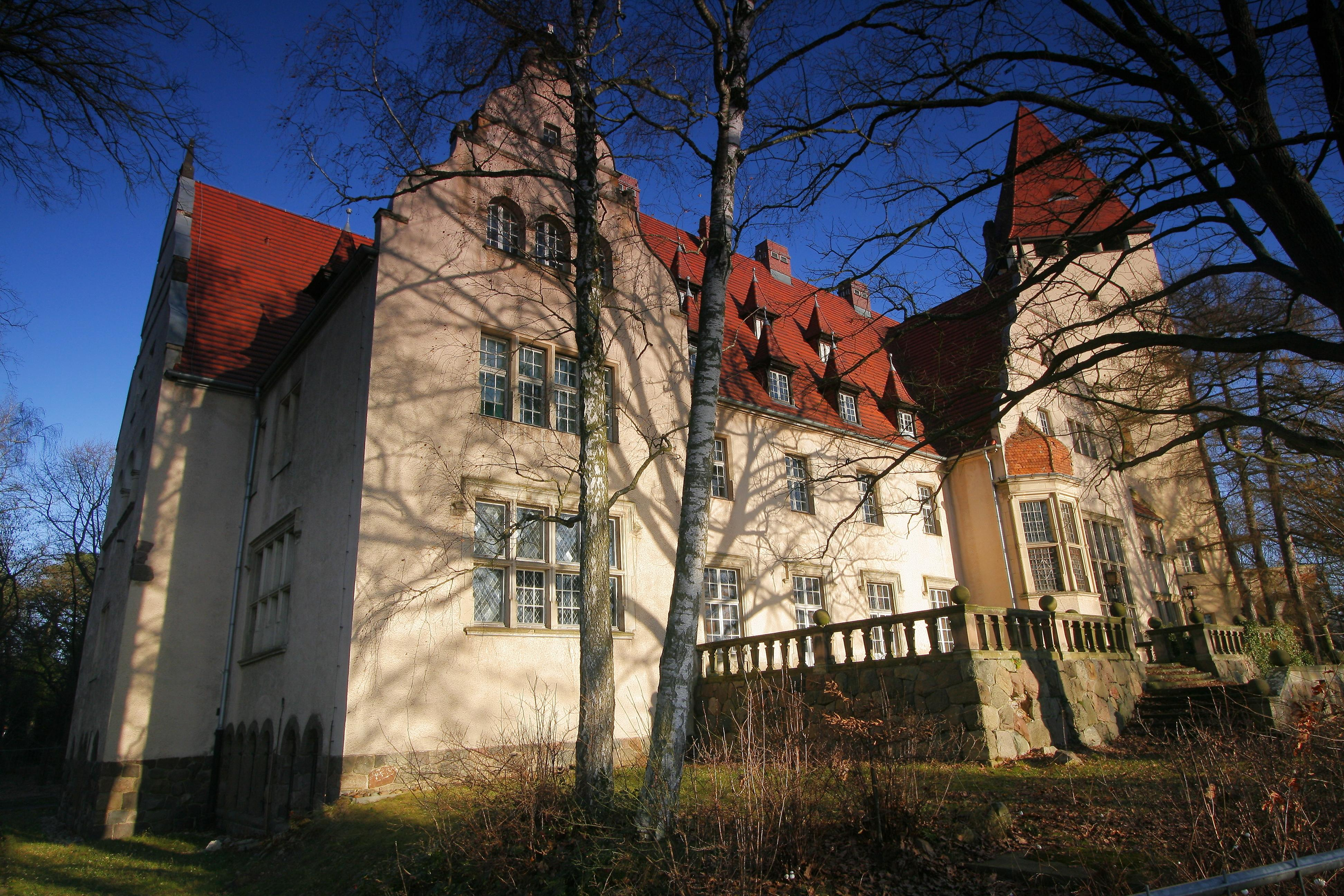
New Palace
