= Archibald Rudd =

English footballer

Personal information
- Full name: Archibald Charles Rudd
- Date of birth: 1887
- Place of birth: Nottingham, England
- Date of death: 12 November 1957 (aged 69–70)
- Height: 5 ft 11 in (1.80 m)
- Position: Full-back

Senior career*
Years	Team	Apps	(Gls)
1907–1908	Nottingham Olympic		
1908–1909	Grimsby Town	1	(0)
- * Club domestic league appearances and goals

Archibald Charles Rudd (1887 – 12 November 1957) was an English professional footballer who played as a full-back.
