= Gmina Krzeszyce =

Gmina Krzeszyce Krzeszyce Commune
- Gmina
- Coat of arms
- Interactive map of Gmina Krzeszyce
- Coordinates (Krzeszyce): 52°35′N 15°0′E
- Country: Poland
- Voivodeship: Lubusz
- County: Sulęcin
- Seat: Krzeszyce

Area
  - Total: 194.22 km^{2} (74.99 sq mi)

Population (2019-06-30)
  - Total: 4,744
  - Density: 24.43/km^{2} (63.26/sq mi)
- Website: http://www.krzeszyce.pl/

Gmina Krzeszyce is a rural gmina (administrative district) in Sulęcin County, Lubusz Voivodeship, in western Poland. Its seat is the village of Krzeszyce, which lies approximately 17 kilometres (11 mi) north-west of Sulęcin and 24 km (15 mi) south-west of Gorzów Wielkopolski.

The gmina covers an area of 194.22 square kilometres (75.0 sq mi), and as of 2019 its total population is 4,744.

== Villages ==
Gmina Krzeszyce contains the villages and settlements of Brzozowa, Brzozówka, Czartów, Dębokierz, Dzierzążna, Jeziorki, Karkoszów, Kołczyn, Krasnołęg, Krępiny, Krzemów, Krzeszyce, Łąków, Łukomin, Malta, Marianki, Maszków, Muszkowo, Piskorzno, Przemysław, Rudna, Rudnica, Studzionka, Świętojańsko and Zaszczytowo.

== Neighbouring gminas ==
Gmina Krzeszyce is bordered by the gminas of Bogdaniec, Deszczno, Lubniewice, Ośno Lubuskie, Słońsk, Sulęcin and Witnica.

== Twin towns – sister cities ==
Gmina Krzeszyce is twinned with:

- Altlandsberg, Germany
