= Coat of arms of Gorzów Wielkopolski =

Polish coat of arms

- Armiger: Gorzów Wielkopolski
- Adopted: 8 March 1996 (current version); 13th century (first known appearance)
- Shield: Blue Iberian style escutcheon
- Compartment: Red griffin head

The coat of arms of Gorzów Wielkopolski in Lubusz Voivodeship, Poland consists of the red eagle holding green clover leaves in each of its talons, placed in the white escutcheon.

== Design ==
The coat of arms of Gorzów Wielkopolski consists of a white Iberian style escutcheon (shield) with square top and rounded base. In its centre is placed a red eagle with its head facing left, and spread wings, and a red tongue put out. It has a yellow (golden) beak, and talons on its legs. The eagle holds green clover leaves in each of its talons.

== History ==
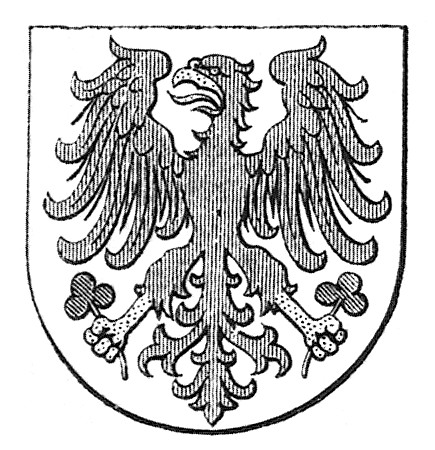
The coat of arms from around 1885.

The design of the coat of arms of the Gorzów Wielkopolski, originates from the coat of arms of the House of Ascania, which founded the city in the 13th century. The coat of arms was related to the coat of arms of Brandenburg. Originally, the eagle did not hold clover leaves, and presumably had its head facing right. The oldest known city seal depicting the eagle comes from 1351. It depicted it with its head facing left. The oldest known design to include the bird holding clover leaves, and placed in the white escutcheon (shield), comes from 1511 documents, although some historians, such as Otto Hupp, mark the first appearance as year 1444. The first known appearance of the colourful design, depicting a red eagle holding green clover leaves, placed in the white shield, was a painting on the city hall, done in 1719. Such colour scheme had been used ever since. In 1991, the city council adopted the city flag, based on the colours of the coat of arms.

The proposed redesign of the coat of arms used as an alternative design, during the Polish People's Republic era.

In coat of arms stopped being official symbol in 1945, when the city was transferred to Poland, in the aftermath of World War II. Despite that, the city continued to unsocially use it as its symbol, for example placing it on city communication vehicles. Additionally, there were unsuccessful attempts to replace it with the design, that included a white eagle, on the red background, holding green clover leaves. The design was inspired by the coat of arms of Poland, and was meant to symbolize the allegiance of the city to Poland. The coat of arms depicting red eagle, was officially again adopted as the symbol of the city, on 8 March 1996.

== See also ==
- flag of Gorzów Wielkopolski
