= Sulęcin County =

Sulęcin County Powiat sulęciński
- County
- Flag Coat of arms

- Location within the voivodeship
- Coordinates (Sulęcin): 52°27′N 15°7′E
- Country: Poland
- Voivodeship: Lubusz
- Seat: Sulęcin
- Gminas: Total 5: Gmina Krzeszyce; Gmina Lubniewice; Gmina Słońsk; Gmina Sulęcin; Gmina Torzym

Area
  - Total: 1,177.43 km^{2} (454.61 sq mi)

Population (2019-06-30)
  - Total: 35,238
  - Density: 29.928/km^{2} (77.513/sq mi)
  - Urban: 14,702
  - Rural: 20,536
- Car plates: FSU
- Website: http://www.powiatsulecinski.pl

Sulęcin County (Polish: powiat sulęciński) is a unit of territorial administration and local government (powiat) in Lubusz Voivodeship, western Poland. It came into being on January 1, 1999, as a result of the Polish local government reforms passed in 1998. Its administrative seat and largest town is Sulęcin, which lies 33 km (21 mi) south of Gorzów Wielkopolski and 63 km (39 mi) north-west of Zielona Góra. The county also contains the towns of Torzym, lying 16 km (10 mi) south of Sulęcin, and Lubniewice, 12 km (7 mi) north-east of Sulęcin.

The county covers an area of 1,177.43 square kilometres (454.6 sq mi). As of 2019 its total population is 35,238, out of which the population of Sulęcin is 10,117, that of Torzym is 2,526, that of Lubniewice is 2,059, and the rural population is 20,536.

== Neighbouring counties ==
Sulęcin County is bordered by Gorzów County to the north, Międzyrzecz County to the east, Świebodzin County to the south-east, Krosno County to the south and Słubice County to the west.

== Administrative divisions ==
The county is subdivided into five gminas (three urban-rural and two rural). These are listed in the following table, in descending order of population.

Gmina	Type	Area (km^{2})	Population (2019)	Seat
Gmina Sulęcin	urban-rural	319.7	15,767	Sulęcin
Gmina Torzym	urban-rural	374.9	6,820	Torzym
Gmina Słońsk	rural	158.9	4,755	Słońsk
Gmina Krzeszyce	rural	194.2	4,744	Krzeszyce
Gmina Lubniewice	urban-rural	129.8	3,152	Lubniewice
