= Rathayibacter toxicus =

Scientific classification
- Domain: Bacteria
- Kingdom: Bacillati
- Phylum: Actinomycetota
- Class: Actinomycetes
- Order: Micrococcales
- Family: Microbacteriaceae
- Genus: Rathayibacter
- Species: R. toxicus

Binomial name
- Rathayibacter toxicus (Riley and Ophel 1992) Sasaki et al. 1998

Type strain
- ATCC 49908; CIP 104617; CS14; DSM 7488; ICMP 9525; JCM 9669; NCPPB 3552

Synonyms
- Clavibacter toxicus Riley and Ophel 1992

Pathogenic bacterium

Rathayibacter toxicus is a phytopathogenic bacterium known for causing annual ryegrass toxicity (ARGT) commonly found in South and Western Australia.

== Etymology ==
The genus Rathayibacter is an homage to E. Rathay, the plant pathologist who first isolated strains of the genus combined with the suffix -bacter meaning "rod" in Latin. The species name, toxicus, stems from the Latin word meaning "poison", due to R. toxicus's ability to produce corynetoxins.

== Taxonomy ==
Rathayibacter toxicus has been previously classified as "Corynebacterium rathayi", "Clavibacter rathayi", and "Clavibacter toxicus". The organism is a member of the family Microbacteriaceae. Microbacteriaceae contains twenty-eight other genera, though a distinct clade is formed between genus Rathayibacter and genus Clavibacter. Genera that are closer related to Rathayibacter are Frigoribacterium, Curtobacterium, and Clavibacter; while genus Leifsonia is more distantly related to Rathayibacter. In genus Rathayibacter there are six species that cluster together within Microbacteriaceae and Rathayibacter toxicus has the deepest branching as it is least related to the other species.

== Discovery ==
In 1956, the first reported livestock deaths due to annual ryegrass toxicity (ARGT) were found in the "wheat-sheep belt" in Black Springs, South Australia. ARGT is caused by grazing on Lolium rigidum infected with a particular bacterium, now known to be R. toxicus. In the late 1950s, J. M. Fisher identified a gall-forming nematode (Anguina sp.) and a yellow-slime bacterium, both pathogens of the seed-heads of annual ryegrass. It was not until 1968 that the bacterium responsible for ARGT was isolated, and later in 1977 mistakenly identified as a Corynebacterium sp. (Corynebacterium rathayi) by A. Kerr.

=== Isolation ===
The principal investigator and discovery date of the organism are known, but the original isolation method is obscured; however, the isolation technique utilized to perform a morphological assessment of a different strain of the same organism was undergone by Bird and Stynes. The researchers identified the organism of interest by the characteristic yellow slime and it was removed from a nematode gall, placed into distilled water, and plated on a unique media (10 grams of sucrose, 8 grams of caseine hydrolyzate, 4 grams of yeast extract, 2 grams of KH_{2}PO_{4}, 0.3 grams of MgSO_{4} 7H_{2}O, 15 grams of agar, and distilled water was added until reaching 1L). Pure yellow colonies formed within 24 hours.

=== Classification ===
The identification of the bacterium as "Corynebacterium rathayi" was insufficiently supported, and transfer into the genus Clavibacter was urged by Davis et al.. in 1984 after the peptidoglycan layer of the cell wall was found to have 2,4-diaminobutyric acid (DAB). In 1987, Riley found that the bacteria associated with ARGT were distinguishable from not only Corynebacterium rathayi but other phytopathogenic coryneforms through immunological assays. Riley, in support of Davis' findings, also identified DAB in the ARGT bacterium's peptidoglycan layer through amino acid analysis, further supporting the reclassification into Clavibacter as Clavibacter sp. Due to differences in serology, allozyme analysis, bacteriophage susceptibility, vector adhesion, and biochemical properties that distinguished the new Clavibacter sp. associated with ARGT from other members of the genus, Riley and Ophel (1992) proposed Clavibacter toxicus as a new species. In 1993, Zgurskaya et al. proposed a new genus, "Rathayibacter," and desired to reclassify the "Clavibacter sp." associated with ARGT into this genus based on differences in menaquinone composition, morphological and physiological characteristics, DNA-DNA relatedness, chemotaxonomy, serology, allozyme / protein patterns, and 16S rRNA gene sequences. In 1998, Clavibacter toxicus was reclassified as Rathayibacter toxicus by Sasaki and colleagues.

== Morphology ==
Rathayibacter toxicus is a Gram-positive, obligate aerobe with irregular rod morphology, usually 0.5 to 0.7 μm in diameter by ~1.1 to 2.0 μm, and ends that are blunt and rounded. It possesses a capsule around the cell that is 0.08-0.2 μm thick, allowing the microorganism to survive hot and arid conditions during the summer or in the absence of a host plant. It does not produce spores or display any mobility. The cell wall of R. toxicus is characterized by the presence of the L-isomer of DAB.

== Genomics ==
4 strains of Rathayibacter toxicus (WAC3373, 70137, DSM 7488, FH142) have had their genomes completely sequenced, assembled, annotated, and published. R. toxicus has been found to have a single circular chromosome with an average genome size of 2.325 Megabases and an average GC content of 61.5%. Strain WAC3373 serves as the reference organism with a genome size of 2.35 Mb, GC content of 61.5%, 2165 total genes, 2069 protein coding genes, 54 total RNA genes (45 tRNA, 6 rRNA, 3 other RNA), and 42 pseudogenes.

=== Sequencing ===
Sechler and his team described their method used to sequence 2 Rathayibacter toxicus strains (FH-79 and FH-232) where they created a shotgun DNA library for both strains using a 454 Junior sequencer. Preexisting information of mapped coding genes were obtained via the Prokaryotic Genome Annotation Pipeline (PGAP) while sample specific DNA annotation was synthesized using the HMMer suite, OriFinder, TBLASTN, Pfam, TIGRFam, TnpPred, Alien_Hunter, and antiSMASH software. A functional tunicamycin gene cluster has been identified consisting of 14 genes composing 2 separate transcriptional units. Fennessey and colleagues found over 300 unique proteins that did not repeat in a general list of identified proteins; and discovered that 16% served as secondary metabolites possibly acquired through horizontal gene transfer and have been found to aid in pathogenicity.

=== KEGG Pathways ===
According to the Kyoto Encyclopedia of Genes and Genomes (KEGG), Rathayibacter toxicus strain WAC3373 is capable of performing glycolysis, citric acid cycle (TCA), arginine biosynthesis, amino acid metabolism, carbohydrate metabolism, and various bacterial DNA repair mechanisms.

== Metabolism ==
Rathayibacter toxicus is a chemoorganotroph that utilizes oxygen as its terminal electron acceptor. Using tubes of Medium C containing a variety of carbon sources, each 0.5% weight per volume concentration, noting growth and acid production for 4 weeks, it was determined that R. toxicus utilizes galactose, mannose, and xylose as carbon sources forming acidic byproducts. The production of acids from carbohydrates occurs oxidatively and weakly.

== Physiology ==
Rathayibacter toxicus is mesophilic with optimum growth at 26 °C (79 °F) and no growth at 37 °C (99 °F). This was determined by examination of bacterial growth on streak-plated 523M agar, incubated at 26 °C (79 °F) and 37 ± 0.5 °C (32.9 °F) after 3, 7, and 14 days. The organism has responded well to 523M agar, CB agar, R agar, and other basic media containing yeast extract, peptone, and glucose when grown at pH 7. R. toxicus requires 0.1% yeast extract for growth. Cultures grown in YSB medium, ranging from 0 to 10% weight per volume concentrations of NaCl, observed after 3, 7, and 14 days revealed that R. toxicus is only able to withstand a maximum of 1% NaCl concentration. The generation time of R. toxicus is approximately 18 hours in 523M broth at 25 °C (77 °F) based on optical density measurements via a spectrophotometer. Colony morphology on 523M agar is convex, smooth, mucoid with yellow, rose-orange, or pink pigmentation.

== Host range ==
Anguina sp. (seed gall nematodes) are natural vectors for transmission of the pathogen. R. toxicus is obligately conveyed by nematode. The organism is known to only infect the floral parts of Poaceae species, a ubiquitous family of grasses, in Australia and parts of South Africa. Lolium rigidum (annual ryegrass) has been found to be commonly infected with R. toxicus from November to March. Other grass species such as Agrostis avenacea (annual blown grass), Ehrharta longiflora (annual veldtgrass), and Polypogon monspeliensis (annual beard grass) were also susceptible to infection by nematode galls carrying R. toxicus.

=== Pathogen ecology ===
A six-gene Multi-Locus Sequence Typing (MLST) and an Inter-Simple Sequence Repeats (ISSR) approach were utilized to gain a better understanding of Rathayibacter toxicus presence.

Initially, ISSRs were used to track the ecological distribution of a Southern Turkish relative species, Clavibacter michiganensis. The ISSRs of R. toxicus were amplified and 10 primers synthesized via PCR. The PCR products were analyzed using agarose gels and the SimQual program identified and designated Jaccard similarity values for 94 ISSR loci of R. toxicus isolates. The Jaccard coefficients, serving as genetic similarity values, were used to generate a tree diagram from UPGMA.

The analyzed MLST genes, involved in antibiotic resistance, chromosome replication, and biosynthetic pathways, served to distinguish the various locations of R. toxicus isolates. The Geneious software, Primer3 suite, and whole genome of R. toxicus allowed for creation of PCR primers R16sF1 and R16sR1 to amplify a 1110 bp 16S rDNA gene fragment. R. toxicus isolates were then made distinguishable by 16S rRNA gene sequence homology.

The ISSR markers that were generated, along with the MLST results confirmed the presence of three distinct populations of Rathayibacter toxicus, RT-I, RT-II, and RT-III. RT-I and RT-II populations are commonly found in South Australia; whereas, population RT-III is found in parts of Western Australia. It was concluded that the composition of genes within each species type is correlated with the organism's ecology.

== Environmental impact ==
Rathayibacter toxicus, transported by the parasitic nematode Anguina funesta, is infectious to annual ryegrass and is the principal cause of annual ryegrass toxicity (ARGT). ARGT is a neurological disorder caused by R. toxicus' secretion of a lethal glycolipid toxin (structurally similar to tunicamycin) in infected livestock. The toxin induces convulsions and/or development of unusual gait which typically ends in death of cattle and sheep grazing on infected plants. Many other organisms have shown vulnerability including horses, pigs, and "other laboratory animals" with sheep having a 90% mortality rate and death occurring within 24 hours of poisoning. ARGT has been a major concern in Western and South Australia for the past 50 years, but symptoms have been identified in regions as far off as South Africa where it was linked to deaths of grazing thoroughbred horses. Although the pathogen requires transmission via the mechanical vector (Anguina funesta), R. toxicus has shown the ability to attach to other Anguina species and infect a variety of plants (i.e. annual beard grass, bent grass, wild oats (Avena spp.), and winged canary grass), as aforementioned. Introduction of R. toxicus to other regions is a current concern due to the economic costs of livestock loss, pasture treatment, and livestock inspections and maintenance.
