= Rychlik (surname) =

Rychlik or Rychlík (Czech feminine: Rychlíková) is a Czech or Polish surname. As a Polish surname, it is derived from a nickname or given name derived from the word "rychły", "quick". Notable people with the surname include:

- Břetislav Rychlík (born 1958), Czech actor
- Jan Rychlík (1916–1964), Czech composer
- Jiří Rychlík (born 1977), Czech footballer
- Karel Rychlík (1885–1968), Czech mathematician
- Marek R. Rychlik
- Piotr Rychlik (born 1984), Polish diplomat
- Wojciech Rychlik, Polish-American biologist and photographer

== See also ==
- Rychlicki
- Rychly
