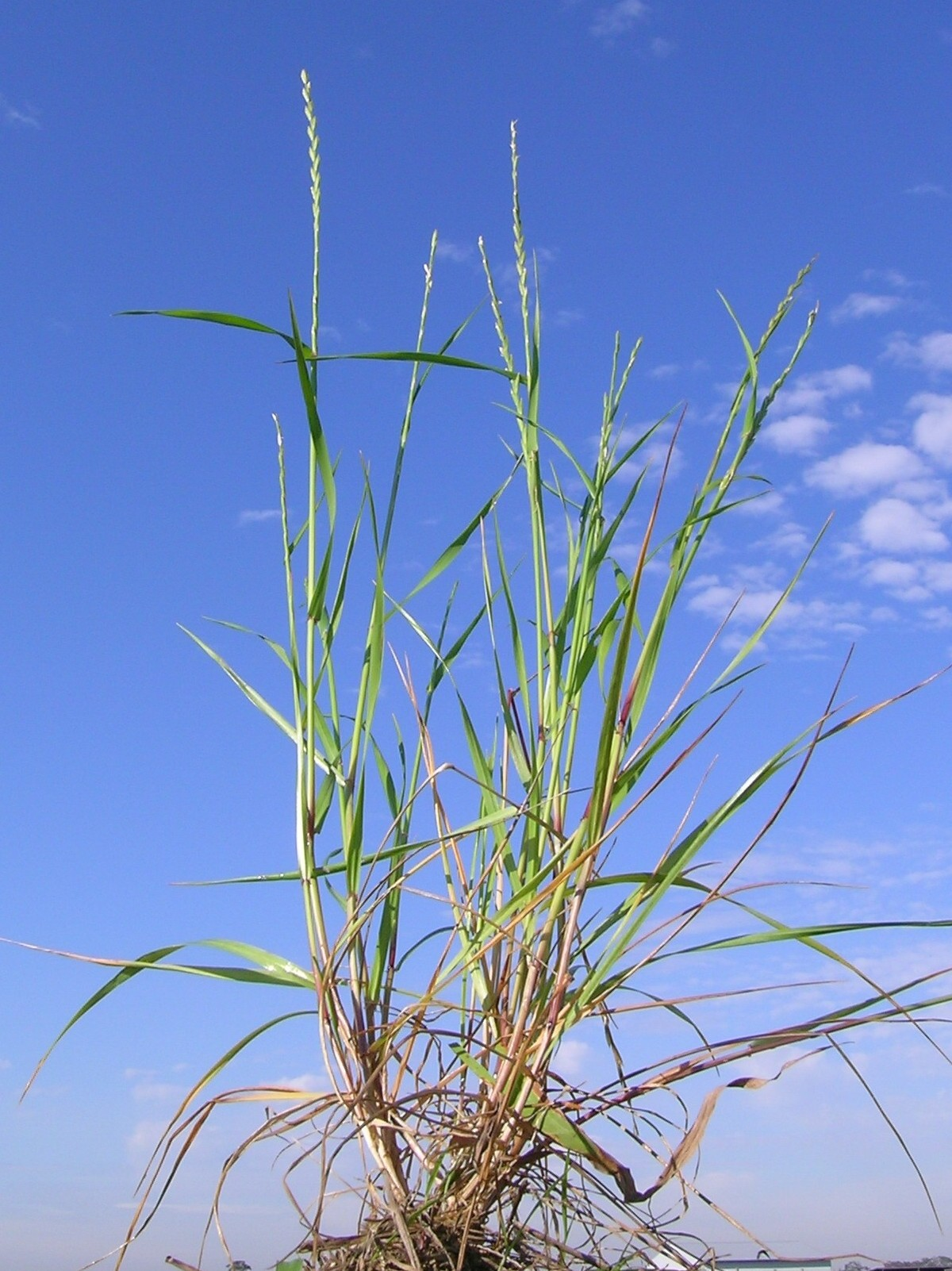

Scientific classification
- Kingdom: Plantae
- Clade: Tracheophytes
- Clade: Angiosperms
- Clade: Monocots
- Clade: Commelinids
- Order: Poales
- Family: Poaceae
- Subfamily: Pooideae
- Genus: Lolium
- Species: L. rigidum

Binomial name
- Lolium rigidum Gaud.

= Lolium rigidum =

Species of grass

Lolium rigidum is a species of annual grass. Common names by which it is known include annual ryegrass, a name also given to Italian ryegrass (Lolium multiflorum), rigid ryegrass, stiff darnel, Swiss ryegrass and Wimmera ryegrass. It is a native of southern Europe, northern Africa, the Middle East and the Indian subcontinent and is grown as a forage crop, particularly in Australia, where it is also a serious and economically damaging crop weed.

== Description ==
Lolium rigidum is an annual grass that grows in open tussocks. It has fibrous roots and can grow up to a metre tall. The plant form is usually erect but may be prostrate. The stems are often geniculate (with a knee-like bend) and are purplish at the base. The leaves are 5 to 25 cm (2 to 10 in) long, and 3 to 5 mm (0.12 to 0.20 in) wide; the upper surface is glossy dark green, flat and hairless with longitudinal veins, and the underside is shiny and smooth.

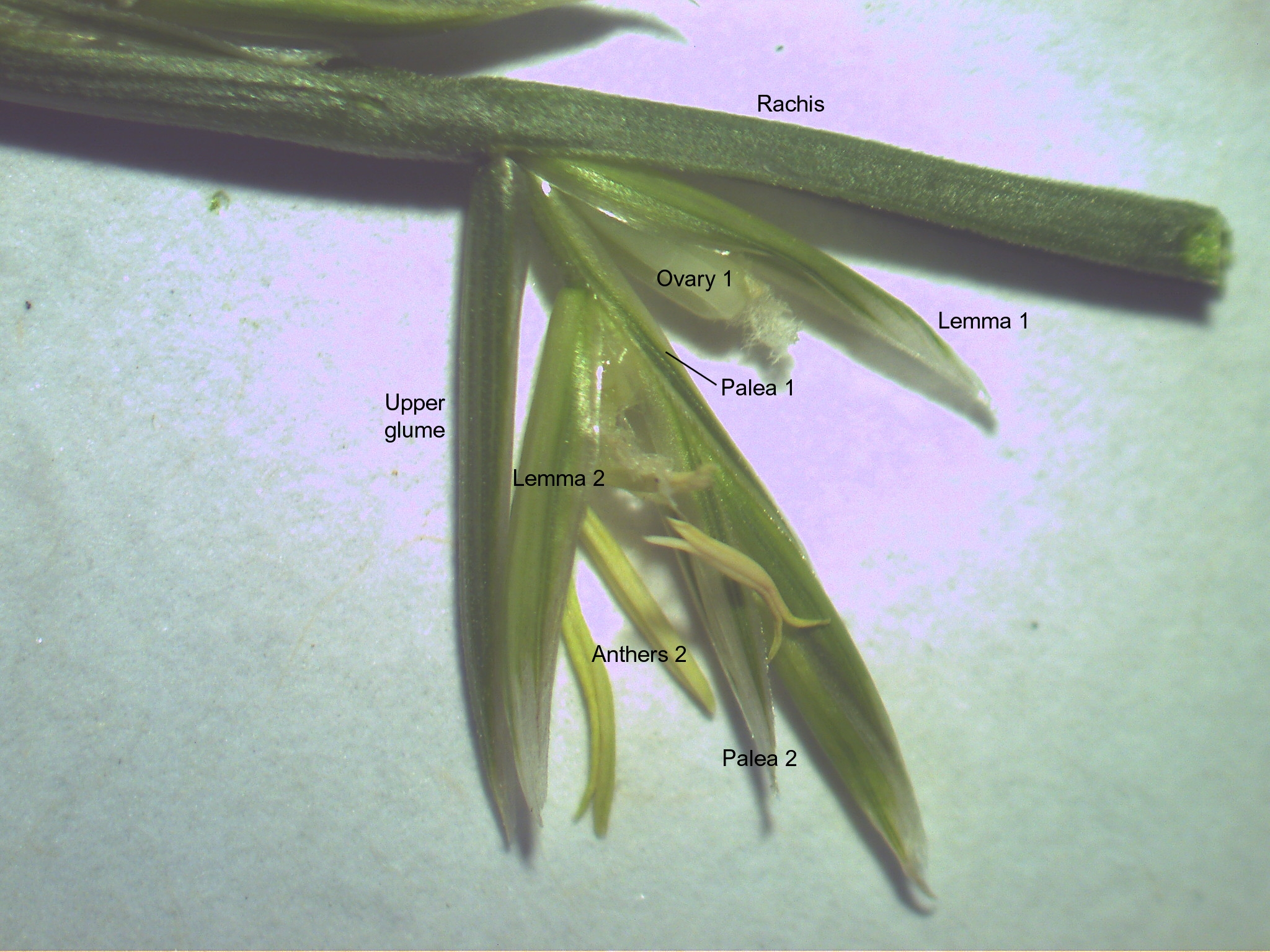
Annotated spikelet

The young leaves are rolled when in bud, the auricles are small and the ligule is white and translucent, wider than it is long. The unbranched flower spike is up to 30 cm (12 in) long, with the spikelets on alternating sides and edgeways-on to the rachis (stem), pressed into recesses in the stem.

The spikelets bear up to twelve florets, mostly with a single glume, with only the terminal floret having two. The glumes are up to three-quarters the length of the spikelet; their outer surface is finely ribbed with longitudinal veins. There is no awn, the lemma is oblong and has five nerves and the palea is a similar shape with two nerve and a few fine hairs. The three anthers are yellow.

== Distribution and habitat ==
Lolium rigidum is a native of the Mediterranean area. Its natural range includes Western, Southern and Central Europe, northern Africa, the Near East, western Asia and the Indian sub-continent. It has spread to many other parts of the world and is considered invasive in some regions. It is planted in Australia as a forage crop but not usually in Europe. It was introduced as a forage crop in Australia around 1880, but has since proven to be an economically damaging weed that infests other more important crops, such as canola and wheat.

== Ecology ==
Lolium rigidum is a diploid grass with a chromosome number of n=7 (2n=14). It exhibits much genetic variability and grows readily in a variety of situations and habitats. It can hybridise with both perennial (L. perenne) and Italian ryegrass (L. multiflorum), as well as some species of Festuca. It propagates solely by seed; freshly shed seed displays dormancy. It is sometimes infected by a rust fungus which has an inhibitory effect on the growth of clovers.

The flower spike of L. rigidum may become infected by a certain species of bacteria, which results in the production of corynetoxins which are toxic to livestock; ingestion of infected material causes a disease, known as annual ryegrass toxicity or annual ryegrass staggers, which is known to occur in the west and south of Australia and in South Africa. The infection is caused by the bacterium Rathayibacter toxicus, which is introduced into the grass by the nematode Anguina funesta. This nematode causes galls on the grass flower spikes and it is in these that the bacteria multiply. Infected galls are present in the winter, but become more toxic as the inflorescence dies in spring. The disease occurs when the pasture is grazed at this toxic stage. Topping the pasture before grazing may prevent the condition, but the seed heads are still toxic when preserved as hay. The symptoms of poisoning are neurological, often causing a mortality rate of forty to fifty percent in infected animals.

L. rigidum is susceptible to infection by ergot (Claviceps purpurea), and also by take-all fungus (Gaeumannomyces graminis) which can cause serious losses in cereal crops.

== Uses ==
Lolium rigidum is grown as a forage crop in suitable areas. About 80% of the seed germinates in the autumn, soon after the first significant rains, and about 5% may remain dormant for twelve months. The plant has vigorous growth, and flowering is initiated when the day length is at least eight hours. This means that the crop has a relatively uniform flowering period in late winter/early spring.

== Damaging effects ==
Because L. rigidum has been grown as a forage crop in southern Australia since the nineteenth century and seeds readily, it grows ubiquitously in the region with large, genetically diverse populations. Now that arable crops are increasingly being grown, it has become an important weed of these crops. The main reason for its success in competing with crops is its ability to produce prolific numbers of seeds per plant – up to 45,000 seeds per 1 m^{2} (11 sq ft) – and also its ability to compete with crops at a very early stage of their life cycle.

In addition, it serves as a host for species of the bacteria Rathayibacter toxicus (formerly Clavibacter), which cause annual ryegrass toxicity (ARGT), and can be infected by the poisonous ergot fungus, which causes ergotism in humans and other mammals.

Attempts to control it with herbicide have met with an unexpectedly high level of herbicide resistance. Over 90% of plants in some populations are tolerant to some of the widely used herbicides. Instead of wiping out the L. rigidum, the herbicides have resulted in the selection of resistant genotypes. Glyphosate resistance was first discovered in populations of rigid ryegrass in Australia in 1996. Since then, glyphosate resistance has been detected in additional populations of rigid ryegrass and Italian ryegrass in several other countries. Possible bioherbicides are being explored, including Pyrenophora seminiperda, a fungus.

L. rigidum has become one of the most serious and economically damaging weeds in southern Australia. A 2021 study listed annual ryegrass as fourth on the list of invasive species which cost Australian farmers the most over a 60-year period, at over a billion Australian dollars.
