= Rychly =

Rychlý or Rychlý is a Czech and Polish surname. Czech feminine: Rychlá. Notable people with the surname include:

- Jana Rychlá, married name of Jana Pospíšilová, Czech tennis player
- Petr Rychlý, Czech actor
- Reinhard Rychly, German gymnast

== See also ==
- Rychlicki
- Rychlik (disambiguation)
