= Rychlik =

Rychlik may refer to:

- Rychlik, Greater Poland Voivodeship
- Rychlik, Lubusz Voivodeship, a village in the administrative district of Gmina Sulęcin
- Rychlik (surname)

== See also ==
- Rychliki
- Rychlak, a surname
