= Annual ryegrass toxicity =

Annual ryegrass toxicity (ARGT) is the poisoning of livestock from toxin contained in bacterially infected annual ryegrass (Lolium rigidum). The toxin is produced by the bacterium Rathayibacter toxicus (formerly Clavibacter toxicus), which is carried into the ryegrass by the nematode Anguina funesta.

== History ==
ARGT was first recorded in vicinity of Black Springs, South Australia, in the 1950s and then near Gnowangerup, Western Australia, in the 1960s. The disease has spread rapidly and approximately 40,000 to 60,000 square kilometres of farmland in Western Australia, and similar areas in South Australia are now infested by the ARGT-causing organisms. Most ARGT-related livestock losses occur during October to January, but losses have been recorded as late as April.

== Symptoms ==
ARGT is a neurological condition and affects the brain. Sheep may at first appear perfectly normal, but if driven for a hundred metres or so, the slight stress will cause mildly affected animals to lag behind the rest of the flock and exhibit a high-stepping gait. More seriously affected animals may lose co-ordination and stumble, but will usually recover and join the rest of the flock if left quietly alone. The most-severely affected sheep will fall repeatedly and may be unable to get up. These sheep are likely to die, with death sometimes occurring within a few hours of the first symptoms appearing.

== Prevention ==
Herbicide applications aimed to reduce ryegrass population have been successful in reducing the risk of ARGT but have undesirable effects such as rapid reduction in pasture productivity and increase in ryegrass herbicide resistance.

A recently released biological control agent, the twist fungus, has been demonstrated to be effective in reducing the risk ARGT without the need of controlling ryegrass. The first use of the twist fungus inoculum was in 1997.
