= Józef Kowalski =

Józef Kowalski may refer to:

- Józef Kowalski (priest) (1911–1942), Polish Roman Catholic priest killed at Auschwitz, beatified
- Józef Kowalski (supercentenarian) (1900–2013), Polish uhlan, second-to-last surviving veteran of the Polish-Soviet War
