= Podbiele =

Podbiele may refer to the following places:

- Podbiele, Lubusz Voivodeship (west Poland)
- Podbiele, Masovian Voivodeship (east-central Poland)
- Podbiele, Podlaskie Voivodeship (north-east Poland)
