= Grochowo, Lubusz Voivodeship =

Grochowo
- Village
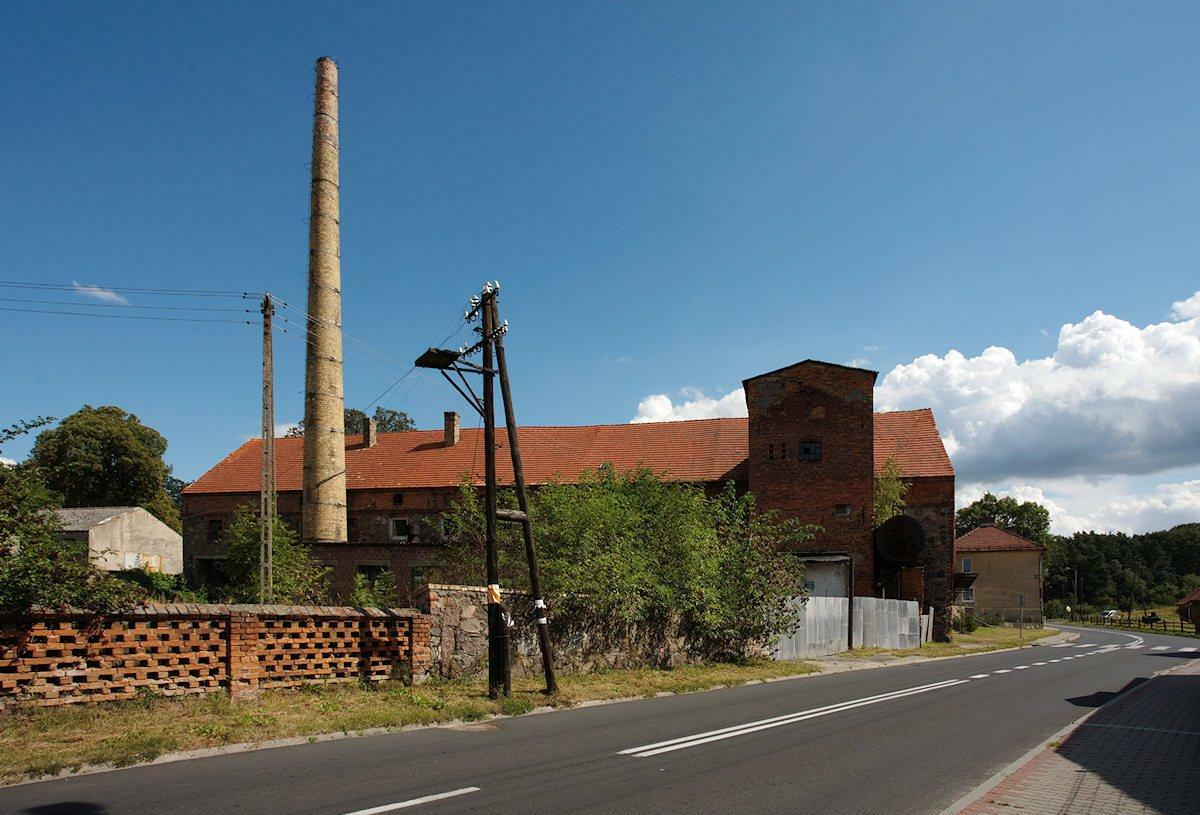
- Distillery in Grochowo

- Location within Poland
- Coordinates: 52°26′N 15°18′E
- Country: Poland
- Voivodeship: Lubusz
- County: Sulęcin
- Gmina: Sulęcin
- Time zone: UTC+1 (CET)
  - Summer (DST): UTC+2 (CEST)
- Postal code: 69-200
- Vehicle registration: FSU

Grochowo [ɡrɔˈxɔvɔ] is a village in the administrative district of Gmina Sulęcin, within Sulęcin County, Lubusz Voivodeship, in western Poland.

Grochowo was a private village, administratively located in the Poznań County in the Poznań Voivodeship in the Greater Poland Province of the Kingdom of Poland.
