= Clavibacter nebraskensis =

Scientific classification
- Domain: Bacteria
- Kingdom: Bacillati
- Phylum: Actinomycetota
- Class: Actinomycetes
- Order: Micrococcales
- Family: Microbacteriaceae
- Genus: Clavibacter
- Species: C. nebraskensis

Binomial name
- Clavibacter nebraskensis (Vidaver and Mandel 1974) Li et al. 2018

Type strain
- ATCC 27794; CCUG 38894; CIP 105362; DSM 7483; ICMP 3298; JCM 9666; LMG 3700; LMG 5627; LMG 7223; NCPPB 2581; VKM Ac-1404

Synonyms
- Clavibacter nebraskensis (Vidaver and Mandel 1974) Nouioui et al. 2018; Corynebacterium michiganense subsp. nebraskense (Vidaver and Mandel 1974) Carlson and Vidaver 1982; Clavibacter michiganensis subsp. nebraskensis corrig. (Vidaver and Mandel 1974) Davis et al. 1984; Corynebacterium nebraskense Vidaver and Mandel 1974 (Approved Lists 1980); Clavibacter michiganense subsp. nebraskense (Vidaver and Mandel 1974) Davis et al. 1984; Clavibacter michiganensis subsp. nebraskense (Vidaver and Mandel 1974) Davis et al. 1984

Species of bacterium

Clavibacter nebraskensis is a species of bacteria in the genus Clavibacter. It causes wilt and blight in maize, called Goss's wilt.

== Range ==
Goss's wilt was first detected in the United States in 1969 in Nebraska and surrounding states. Between 2006 and 2017, the disease reemerged in the US and spread to Canada ranging from Colorado in the west to Indiana in the east. The southern range extended south from Texas and north to Canadian provinces Alberta and Manitoba. The disease was also found in Mexico in 2023 and South Africa in 2024.

== Genetics ==
An annotated nucleotide sequence was expected to be available soon after 2011. The single chromosome is of 3.06 megabases (of which the GC-content is 73.0), mostly collinear, and contains 2 rRNA operons, and 45 tRNAs. As of 2011 when a partial annotation was available, it appeared to contain 50 pseudogenes and no insertion elements. A chloride channel is suspected to be a virulence factor.
