= Primer Premier =

- Developer(s): Premier Biosoft
- Stable release: 6.24
- Operating system: Windows, Mac OS X
- Type: Bioinformatics
- License: commercial
- Website: http://www.premierbiosoft.com

Primer Premier is a bioinformatics software used for various PCR applications. It supports the design of degenerate primers for amplifying a related set of nucleotide sequences for the detection of common traits amongst organisms, as well as to determine heredity.

The software also designs tagged and nested primers for multiplex PCR reactions.

The Primer Premier software supports motif analysis and ORF search along with finding restriction cut sites on the nucleotide sequence.

The software has a built-in nucleotide-protein and protein-nucleotide sequence translator which can be used for designing degenerate primers for codons that code for multiple amino acid sequences. It is also understood that the primers designed by Primer Premier are effective and confirm to the design guidelines laid for designing primers for housekeeping genes with a high G+C%.

The software also designs primers for flanking exons and introns in a gene, though there is no mention of it on the official Primer Premier page on the Premier Biosoft website.

The software calculates the hairpin structure stability and has been used to study its effect on PCR amplification.

== Competitors ==
There are many other software programs that design primers for the PCR reaction. Some of them are listed below:

1. Geneious
2. Primer3
3. DNASTAR's products such as SeqBuilder and PrimerSelect
4. AlleleID (produced by the same company as Primer Premier)
5. PrimerX (for site-directed mutagenesis)
6. GenomePride
7. OLIGO
