= Żarzyn =

- Village
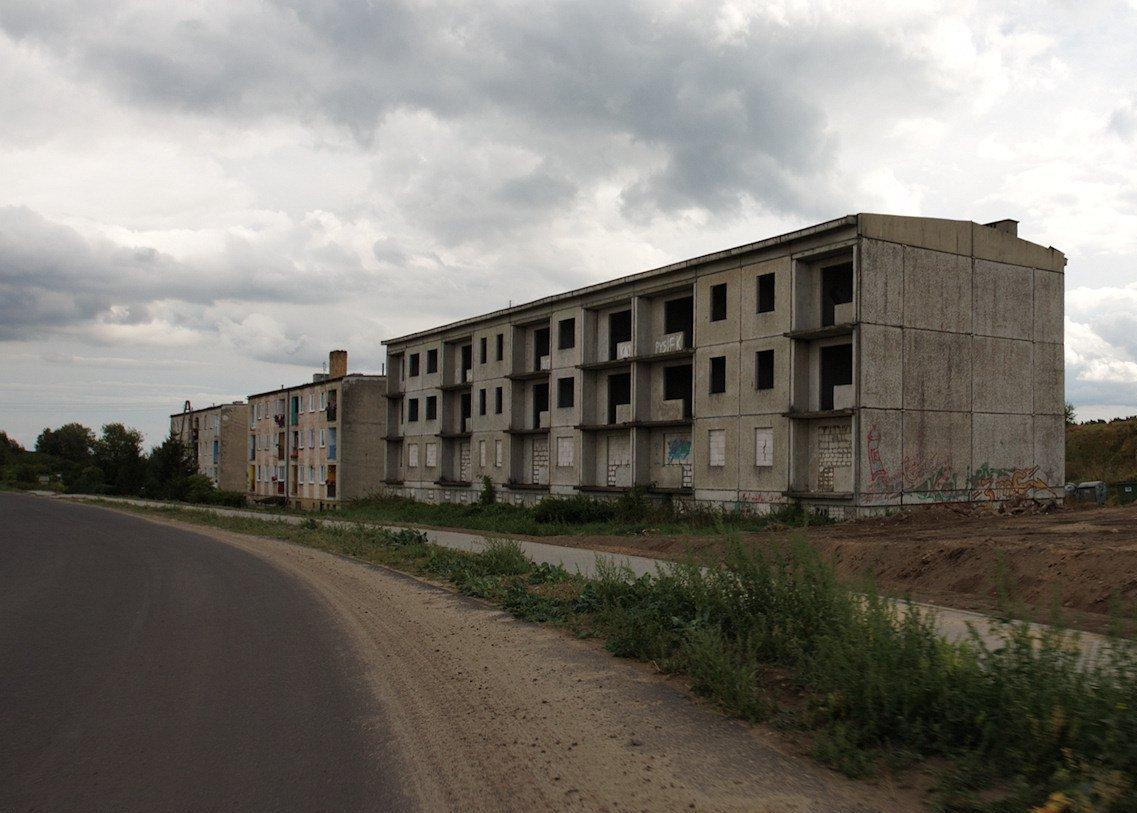

- Location within Poland
- Coordinates: 52°23′15″N 15°25′27″E
- Country: Poland
- Voivodeship: Lubusz
- County: Sulęcin
- Gmina: Sulęcin
- Time zone: UTC+1 (CET)
  - Summer (DST): UTC+2 (CEST)
- Vehicle registration: FSU

Żarzyn [ˈʐaʐɨn] is a village in the administrative district of Gmina Sulęcin, within Sulęcin County, Lubusz Voivodeship, in western Poland.

Żarzyn was a private church village, administratively located in the Poznań County in the Poznań Voivodeship in the Greater Poland Province of the Kingdom of Poland.
