= Wędrzyn =

- Village
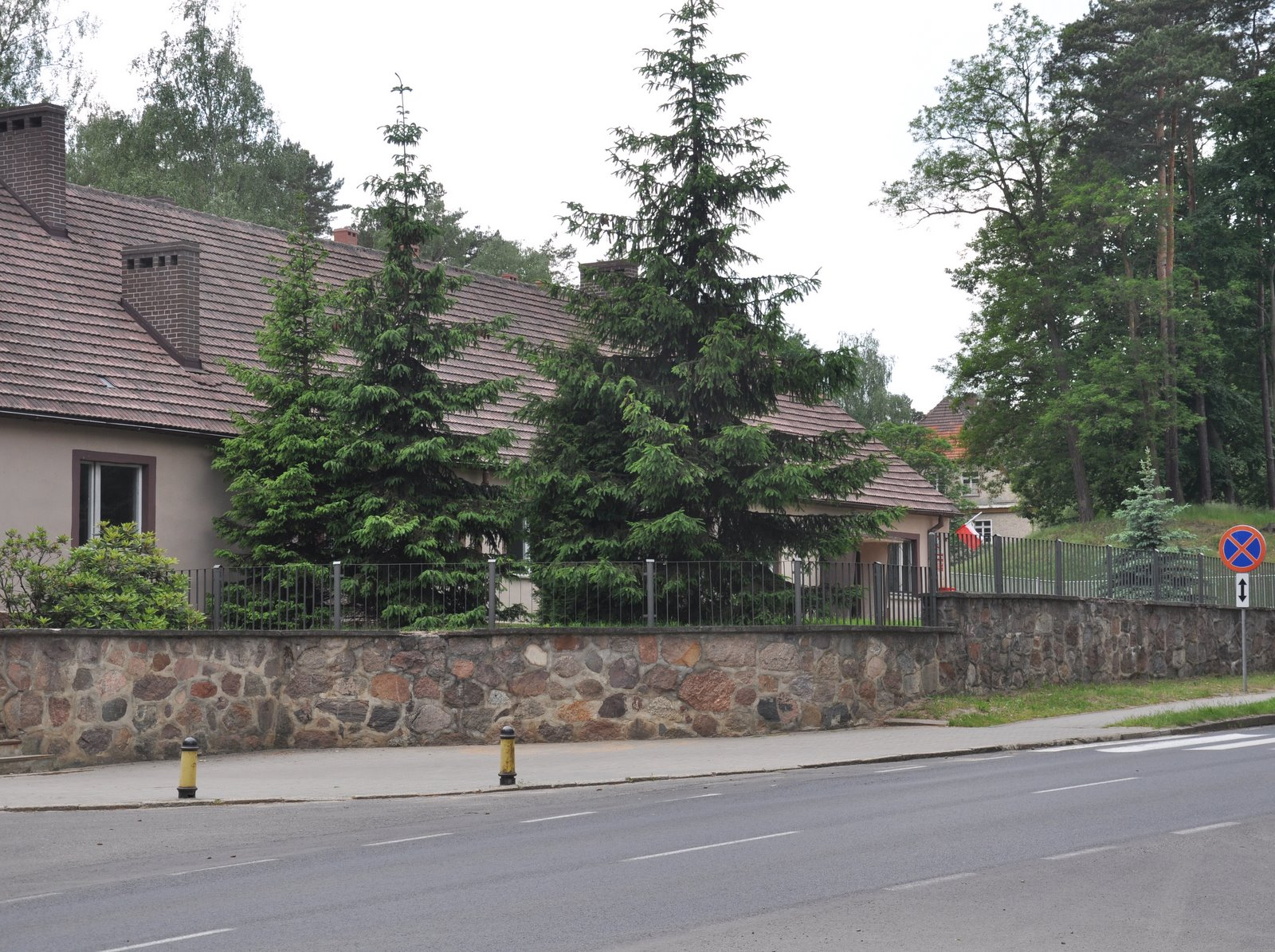
- Military barracks

- Location within Poland
- Coordinates: 52°26′N 15°12′E
- Country: Poland
- Voivodeship: Lubusz
- County: Sulęcin
- Gmina: Sulęcin
- Time zone: UTC+1 (CET)
  - Summer (DST): UTC+2 (CEST)

Wędrzyn [ˈvɛndʐɨn] (German: Wandern) is a village in the administrative district of Gmina Sulęcin, within Sulęcin County, Lubusz Voivodeship, in western Poland.

The oldest known mention of the village comes from 1322 when local Polish Duke Henry IV the Faithful of the Piast dynasty granted it to the Knights Hospitaller. Later on, the village fell to Brandenburg, the Czech Crown, Prussia and Germany in 1871, before being reintegrated with Poland after the World War II in 1945. In the 1930s, a military training ground was built nearby.
