= Tursk, Lubusz Voivodeship =

Tursk
- Village
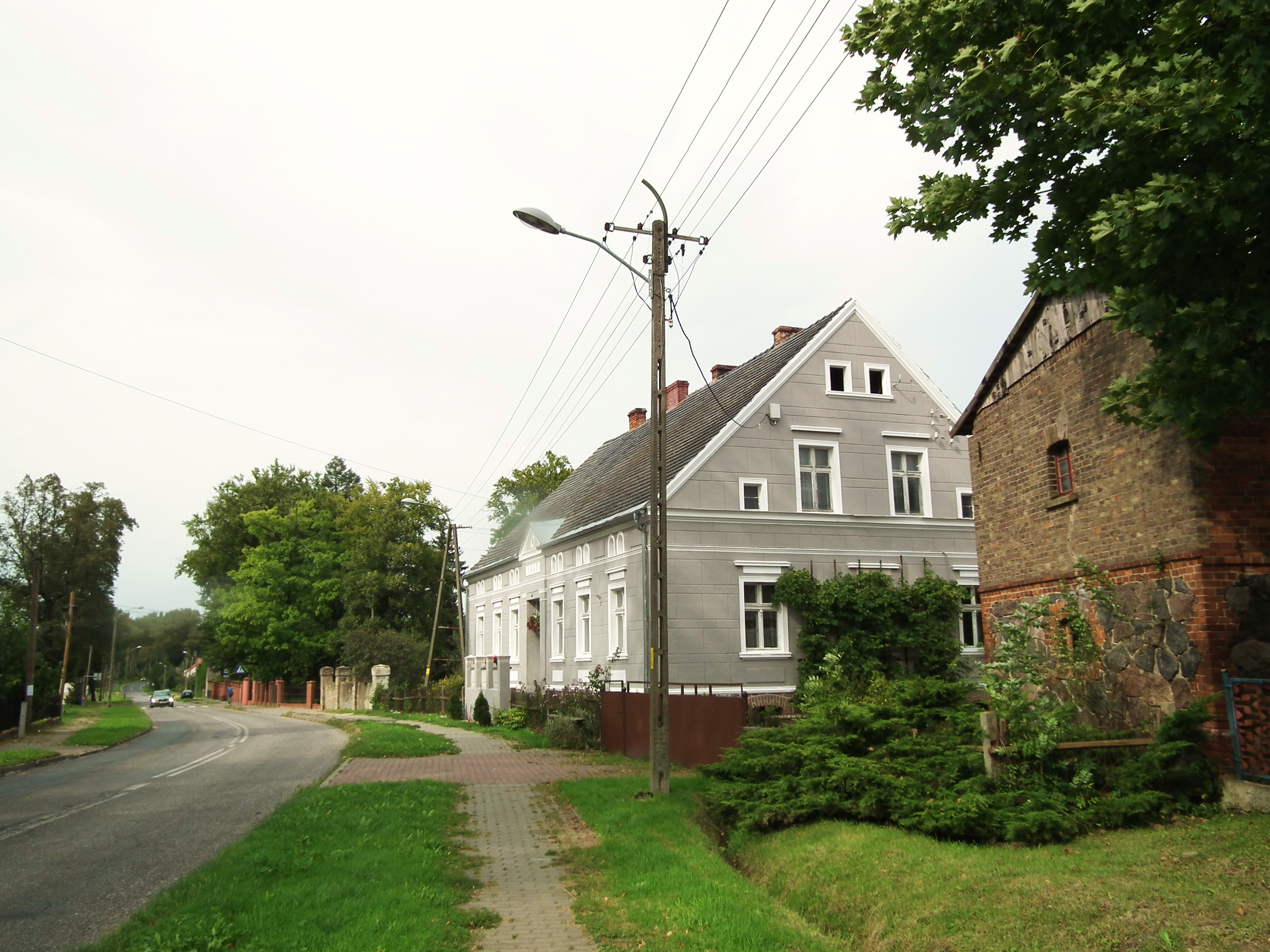

- Location within Poland
- Coordinates: 52°24′N 15°7′E
- Country: Poland
- Voivodeship: Lubusz
- County: Sulęcin
- Gmina: Sulęcin

Tursk [tursk] is a village in the administrative district of Gmina Sulęcin, within Sulęcin County, Lubusz Voivodeship, in western Poland.

== Notable people ==
- Józef Kowalski, Polish-Soviet War veteran
