= Pamiątkowice =

- Settlement
- Location within Poland
- Coordinates: 52°26′53″N 15°15′58″E
- Country: Poland
- Voivodeship: Lubusz
- County: Sulęcin
- Gmina: Sulęcin

Pamiątkowice [pamjɔntkɔˈvit͡sɛ] is a settlement in the administrative district of Gmina Sulęcin, within Sulęcin County, Lubusz Voivodeship, in western Poland.
