= Ostrów, Lubusz Voivodeship =

Ostrów
- Village
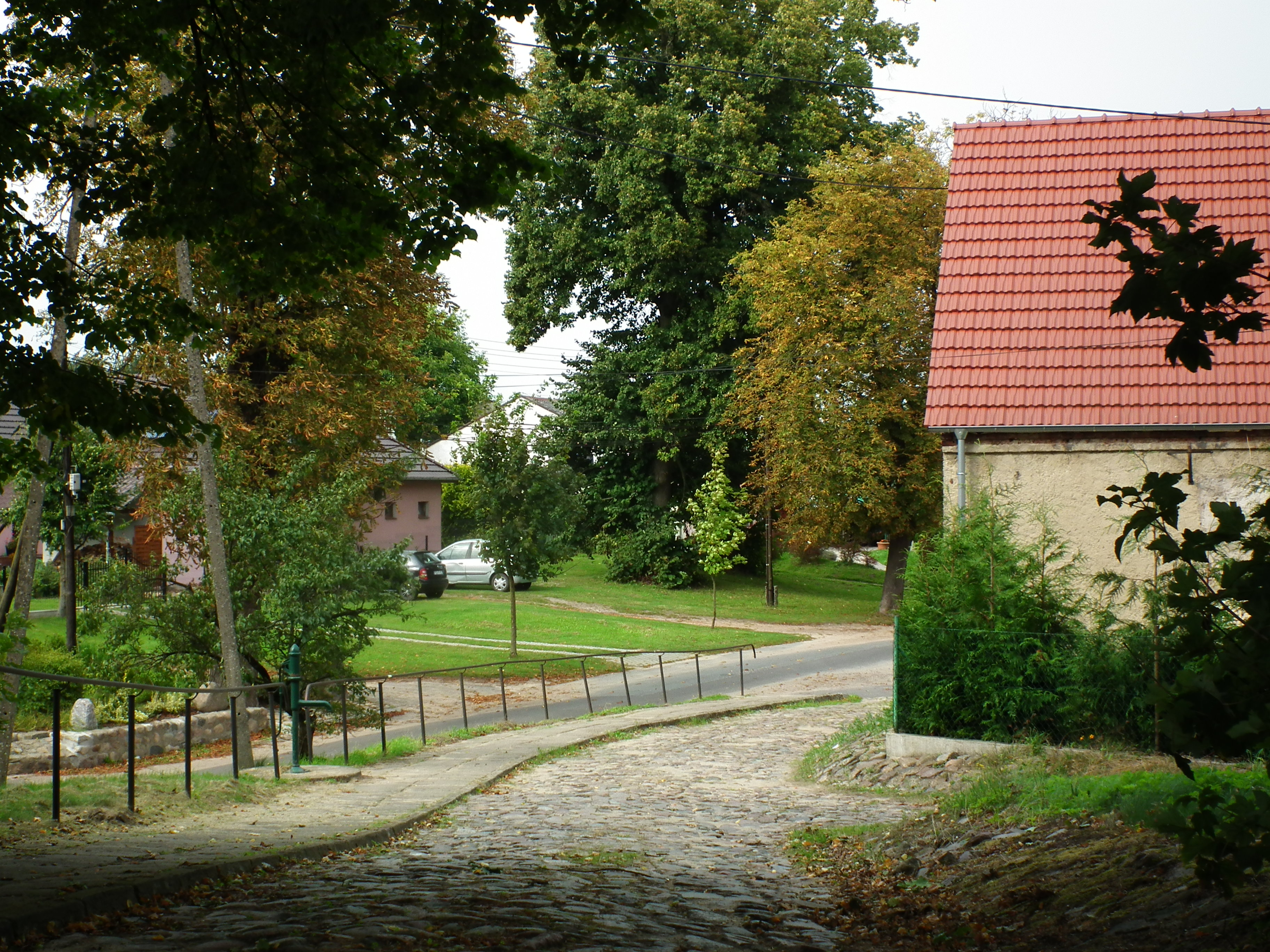

- Location within Poland
- Coordinates: 52°25′19″N 15°6′53″E
- Country: Poland
- Voivodeship: Lubusz
- County: Sulęcin
- Gmina: Sulęcin
- Population: 340

Ostrów [ˈɔstruf] is a village in the administrative district of Gmina Sulęcin, within Sulęcin County, Lubusz Voivodeship, in western Poland.
