= Trzemeszno Lubuskie =

- Village
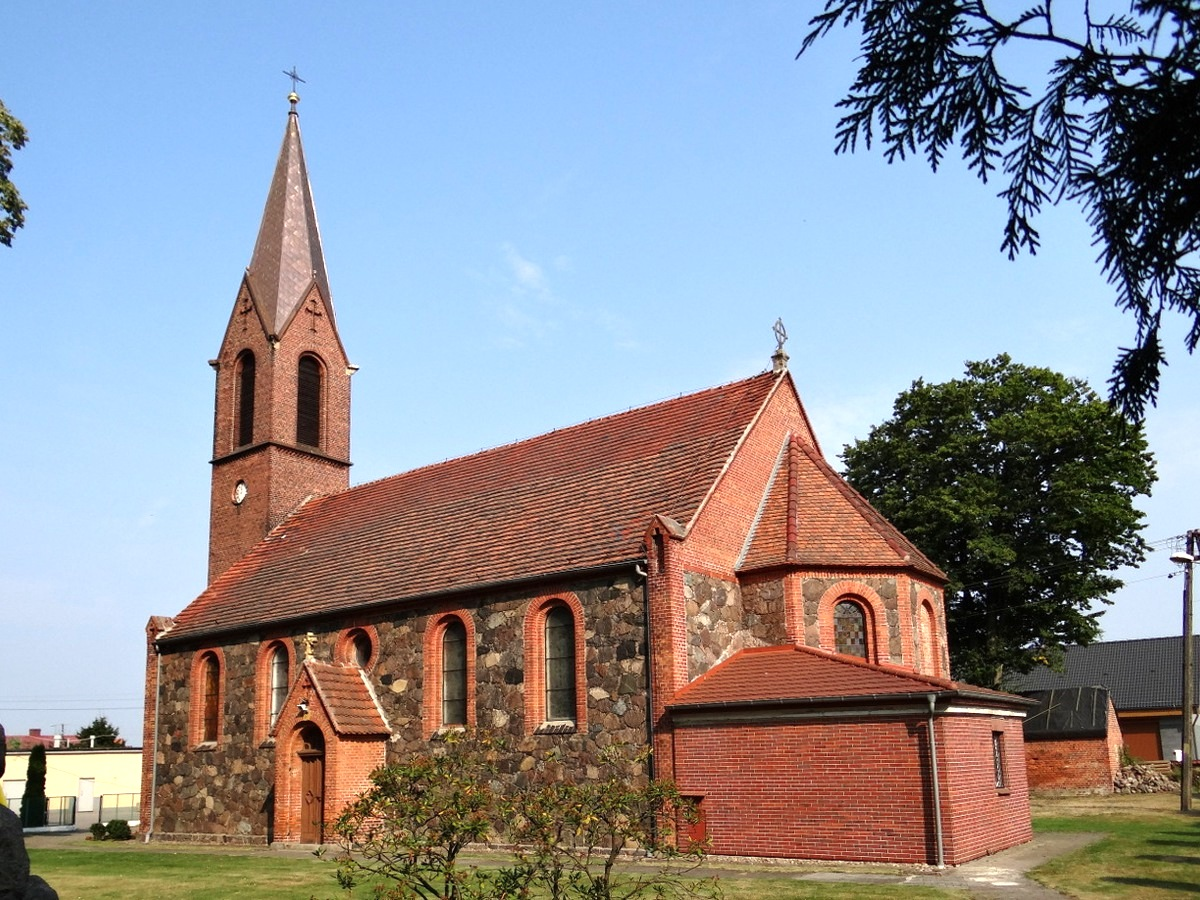
- Our Lady Queen of Poland church in Trzemeszno Lubuskie

- Location within Poland
- Coordinates: 52°26′N 15°15′E
- Country: Poland
- Voivodeship: Lubusz
- County: Sulęcin
- Gmina: Sulęcin

Population
  - Total: 700
- Time zone: UTC+1 (CET)
  - Summer (DST): UTC+2 (CEST)
- Postal code: 69-213
- Vehicle registration: FSU
- Website: http://www.trzemesznolubuskie.vgh.pl

Trzemeszno Lubuskie ([tʂɛˈmɛʂnɔ luˈbuskʲɛ], formerly Czarnomyśl until 1816) is a village in the administrative district of Gmina Sulęcin, within Sulęcin County, Lubusz Voivodeship, in western Poland.

== History ==
The village, formerly known in Polish as Czarmyśl and Czarnomyśl, was a private village, administratively located in the Poznań County in the Poznań Voivodeship in the Greater Poland Province of the Kingdom of Poland. In the course of the Second Partition of Poland in 1793, the village, under the Germanized name of Schermeisel, was annexed by the Kingdom of Prussia. In 1807 it was regained by Poles and included within the short-lived Duchy of Warsaw. After the duchy's dissolution in 1815, the village was re-annexed by Prussia and included within the semi-autonomous Grand Duchy of Posen. In 1816, after a border adjustment, it became part of the Prussian Province of Brandenburg. From 1871 to 1945, Schermeisel belonged to Germany. After World War II, with the implementation of the Oder-Neisse line the village was returned to Poland.

Wołkodar, a secret Warsaw Pact military storage facility for nuclear weapons, was built near the village in the 1960s.

== Sons and daughters ==
- Otto Schmidt-Hannover (1888–1971), German politician, DNVP
