= Gene Designer =

Atum Gene Developer

- Gene Designer Sequence View enables manipulation of sequence elements, codon choices, and oligonucleotide positions. Rapidly search for sequence motifs, restriction sites, and open reading frames.
- Developer: ATUM
- Release: 2006; 20 years ago
- Stable release: 2.01.191 / October 9, 2015; 11 years ago
- Operating system: Windows, macOS, Linux
- Platform: x86, x86-64
- Available in: English
- Type: Molecular biology toolkit
- License: Freeware, registration required
- Website: www.atum.bio/resources/tools/gene-designer

Gene Designer is a computer software package for bioinformatics. It is used by molecular biologists from academia, government, and the pharmaceutical, chemical, agricultural, and biotechnology industries to design, clone, and validate genetic sequences. It is proprietary software, released as freeware needing registration.

== Features ==
Gene Designer enables molecular biologists to manage the full gene design process in one application, using a range of design tools.

- Algorithms for in silico cloning, codon optimization, back translation, and primer design
- Graphic molecular View to display, annotate, and edit constructs
- Customizable database to store, manage, and track genetic elements, genes, and constructs
- Drag and drop interface to move sequence elements within or between constructs (patented feature)
- Search feature for sequence motifs, restriction sites, and open reading frames
- Codon optimize for recombinant protein production in any organism using multiple algorithms
- Remove or add restriction sites or other sequence motifs
- Recode open reading frames
- Check translation frames and fusion junctions
- Design oligonucleotides to sequence primers, includes a real time melting point calculator
- Cloning tool with drag and drop ability to cut, combine, and clone insert and vector

Gene Designer clones with a drag and drop feature. Users can drag a vector and insert into the Cloning Tool; cut, combine and clone. Gene Designer assembles a clone that can then be dropped directly into a project.

== Educator and student use ==
This free software has been incorporated into classroom and lab curricula for synthetic biology, systems biology, bioengineering, and bioinformatics. Students create and complete projects that manage the full gene design process in one application, using a range of design tools.

Examples of use in curricula:

- Synthetic Photonics Course; Utah State University, College of Engineering
- Lab Project using Gene Designer 2.0
- Systems Biology Lesson Overview
- Synthetic Biology Lesson Overview
- Student Projects

== See also ==
- Bioinformatics
- Computational biology
- Gene synthesis
- Vector (molecular biology), Vector DNA, Cloning vector, Expression vector
- Restriction map
- Molecular cloning
- List of open source bioinformatics software
