= Długoszynek =

- Village
- Location within Poland
- Coordinates: 52°23′48″N 15°19′48″E
- Country: Poland
- Voivodeship: Lubusz
- County: Sulęcin
- Gmina: Sulęcin

Długoszynek [dwuɡɔˈʂɨnɛk] is a village in the administrative district of Gmina Sulęcin, within Sulęcin County, Lubusz Voivodeship, in western Poland.
