= Rychlak =

Rychlak is a surname. Notable people with the surname include:

- Gene Rychlak (1968–2019), American powerlifter
- Joseph F. Rychlak (1928–2013), psychologist
- Ronald J. Rychlak (born 1957), American lawyer and author

== See also ==
- Rychlik (disambiguation)
