= Wielowieś, Lubusz Voivodeship =

Wielowieś
- Village
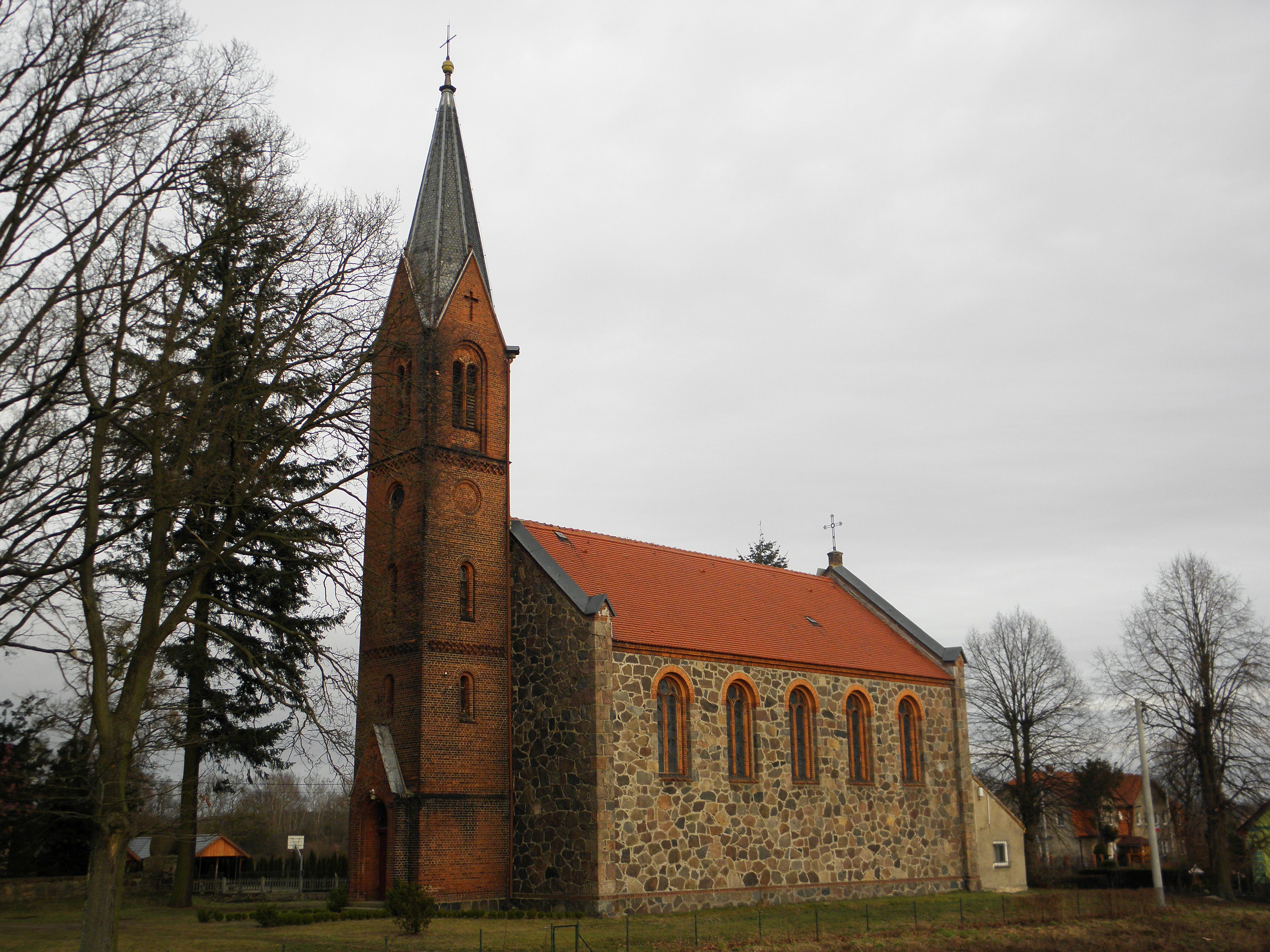
- Catholic church

- Location within Poland
- Coordinates: 52°23′45″N 15°21′36″E
- Country: Poland
- Voivodeship: Lubusz
- County: Sulęcin
- Gmina: Sulęcin
- Population: 231

Wielowieś [vjɛˈlɔvjɛɕ] is a village in the administrative district of Gmina Sulęcin, within Sulęcin County, Lubusz Voivodeship, in western Poland.
