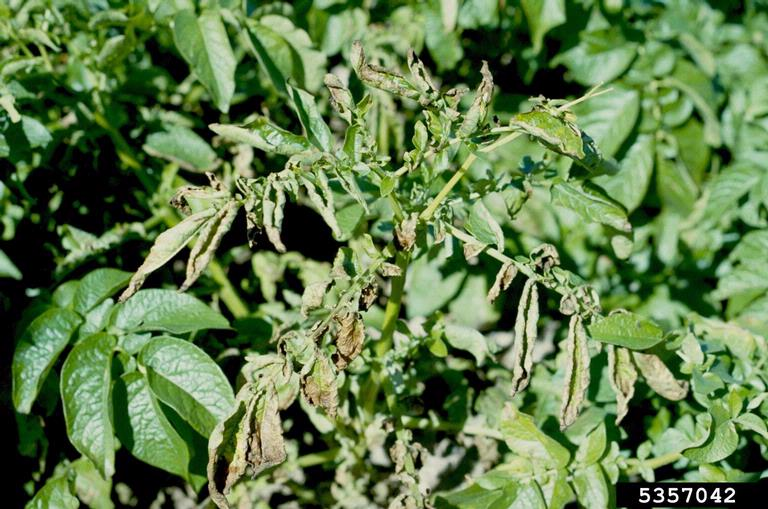
- Potato plant infected with bacterial ring rot of potato caused by Clavibacter sepedonicus

Scientific classification
- Domain: Bacteria
- Kingdom: Bacillati
- Phylum: Actinomycetota
- Class: Actinomycetes
- Order: Micrococcales
- Family: Microbacteriaceae
- Genus: Clavibacter
- Species: C. sepedonicus

Binomial name
- Clavibacter sepedonicus (Spieckermann and Kotthoff 1914) Li et al. 2018

Type strain
- ATCC 33113; CCUG 23908; CFBP 2049; CIP 104844; DSM 20744; ICMP 2535; JCM 9667; LMG 2889; NCPPB 2137; VKM Ac-1405

Synonyms
- Clavibacter sepedonicus (Spieckermann and Kotthoff 1914) Nouioui et al. 2018; "Bacterium sepedonicum" Spieckermann and Kotthoff 1914; Corynebacterium michiganense subsp. sepedonicum (Spieckermann and Kotthoff 1914) Carlson and Vidaver 1982; Corynebacterium sepedonicum (Spieckermann and Kotthoff 1914) Skaptason and Burkholder 1942 (Approved Lists 1980); Clavibacter michiganensis subsp. sepedonicum (Spieckermann and Kotthoff 1914) Davis et al. 1984; Clavibacter michiganense subsp. sepedonicum (Spieckermann and Kotthoff 1914) Davis et al. 1984; Clavibacter michiganense subsp. sepedonicus (Spieckermann and Kotthoff 1914) Davis et al. 1984; Clavibacter michiganensis subsp. sepedonicus corrig. (Spieckermann and Kotthoff 1914) Davis et al. 1984

= Clavibacter sepedonicus =

Species of bacterium

Clavibacter sepedonicus is a species of bacteria in the genus Clavibacter. C. sepedonicus is a high-profile alien plant pathogen of A2 Quarantine status affecting only potatoes. It causes a disease in potatoes known as 'ring rot' due to the way it rots vascular tissue inside potato tubers It is present in parts of Europe but is under statutory control under 'Council Directive 93/85/EEC' of 4 October 1993 on the control of potato ring rot. This means that if an outbreak occurs, the outbreak must be controlled and if possible the disease has to be eradicated. If necessary, prohibitions are put into place to prevent further spread.

A plant showing symptoms of ring rot should be reported to the local plant health authority.

== Hosts and symptoms ==
C. sepedonicus is an economically important pathogen because it affects only potato, which was the 12th highest ranking commodity in 2009, generating $44,128,413,000 globally. Like all bacteria in the genus Clavibacter, C. sepedonicus causes a systemic vascular infection by invading the xylem vessels and multiplying there which sometimes leads to plugged xylem vessels. When diagnosing a C. sepedonicus infection in potato, look for discoloration of the vascular ring within the tuber that has been described as "glassy" or "water-soaked" with the ooze inside having a "cheese-like consistency".

Symptoms of potato 'ring rot' are yellowing of the leaf margins which later turn brown and look like they are burned. Tubers rot from the inside, sometimes progressing to leave hollow shells. Rotting of the tubers is the more common symptom. Infected land cannot be used again for susceptible crops for several years. Among others, United States, Canada, many EU states and Middle Eastern countries have not yet been able to eradicate this pathogen.

== Disease cycle ==
The causal agent of Ring Rot of Potato overwinters many different ways. The bacteria survives in infected tubers in both storage and in the field. Diseased tubers then infect newly planted tubers. The bacterium also may be found as dried slime on machinery or containers. For instance, if a knife cuts into an infected tuber, the next 20 tubers that the knife cuts have a high risk of becoming infected. The bacteria enters the host through wounds and invades the xylem where it multiplies via binary fission. If colonization is successful, the bacteria may plug the xylem vessels. In advanced stages of infection, the bacteria will move out of the vessels and break down the surrounding parenchyma tissue before moving into new vessels. The bacteria may also invade the roots and cause them to deteriorate.

C. sepedonicus spreads by contaminated soil, surfaces, infected seed, wash waters, infected potato waste, etc. It can survive on warehouse walls, boxes, bags etc. On machinery in dry conditions, it can survive at least a month – sometimes in the form of dried bacterial ooze. It is also able to overwinter in soil in association with plant debris. C. sepedonicus will only survive in the soil as long as the host tissue in which it resides persists and resists decomposition by saprophytic microorganisms in the soil. This poor ability to compete as a saprophyte in the absence of a susceptible host makes Clavibacter sp. known as soil invaders as opposed to soil inhabitants.

== Environment ==
North, Northwest and Central Europe have favorable climates for virulence. The disease multiplies rapidly and survives longer in cooler environments around 21 °C. At favorable conditions, the pathogen can survive 63 months in infected potato stems and 18 months in burlap sacks.

== Management ==
In the UK, DEFRA Plant Health and Seed Inspectors (PHSI) and the Scottish Government carry out annual survey work on ware and seed potatoes. Samples are sent to the Fera Science which was formerly known as The Central Science Laboratory (for England and Wales) and to SASA (for Scotland) for latent infection testing (infected but not showing symptoms). Infected crops once identified are intercepted, impounded, and destroyed. additional text. In the EU, quarantine facilities and licences are required to obtain, hold, and/or work with the bacteria and in the UK, Department of Trade and Industry (DTI) export licences are required to export it to countries outside of the EU whether through a third party country or not. The last known outbreak in the UK was in August 2004.

There are no chemicals to treat ring rot of potato. There are no resistant varieties either. If a tuber tests positive for C. sepedonicus, proper authorities should be immediately contacted as this is a quarantine disease in the United States as well Europe.

C. sepedonicus presents a danger of long-distance dispersal due to its ability to survive in seeds.
