= Długoszyn-Kolonia =

- Village
- Location within Poland
- Coordinates: 52°27′33″N 15°04′58″E
- Country: Poland
- Voivodeship: Lubusz
- County: Sulęcin
- Gmina: Sulęcin

Długoszyn-Kolonia [dwuˈɡɔʂɨn kɔˈlɔɲa] is a village in the administrative district of Gmina Sulęcin, within Sulęcin County, Lubusz Voivodeship, in western Poland.
