= Glisno, Gmina Sulęcin =

Glisno
- Village
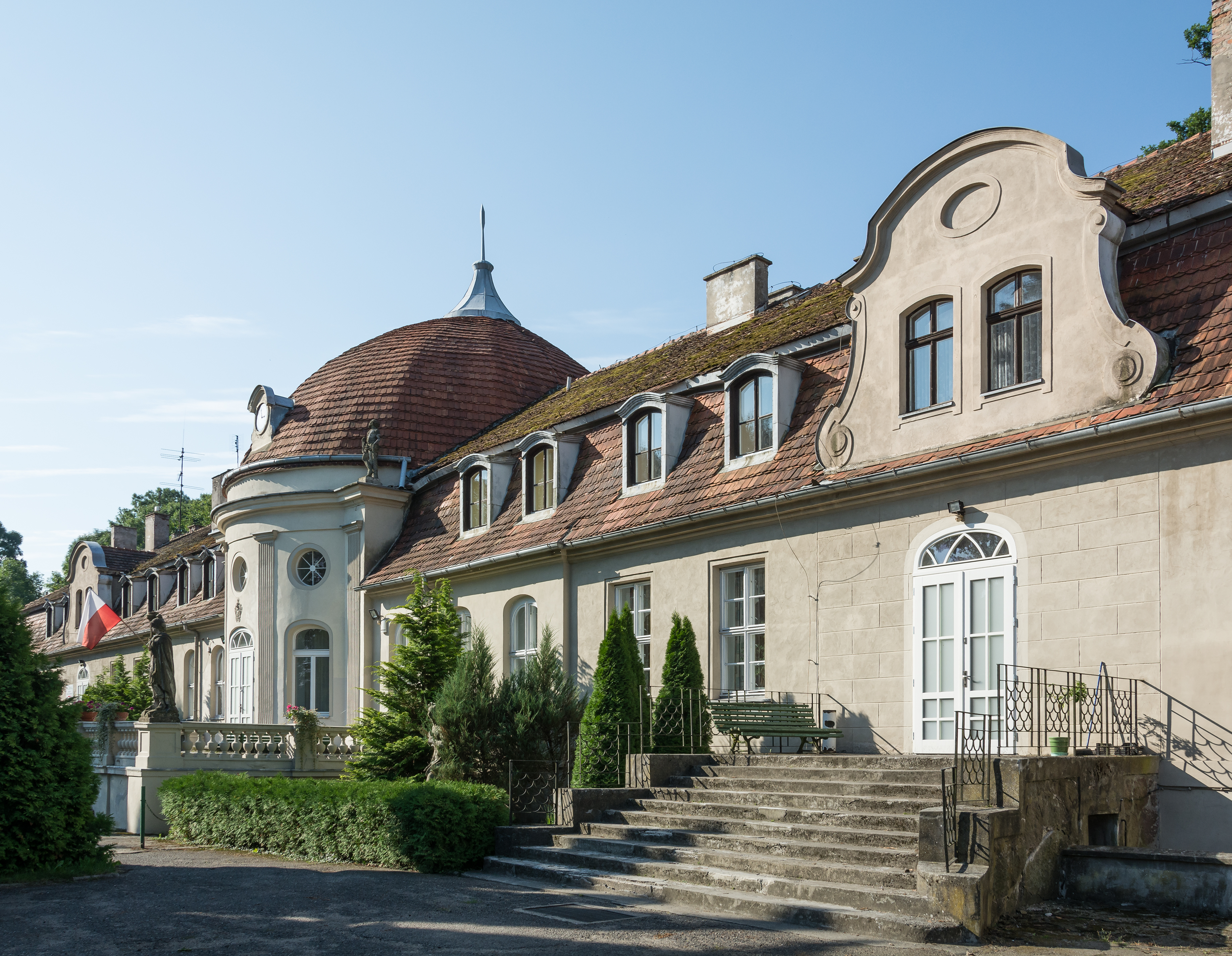
- Palace

- Location within Poland
- Coordinates: 52°28′37″N 15°13′48″E
- Country: Poland
- Voivodeship: Lubusz
- County: Sulęcin
- Gmina: Sulęcin

Glisno [ˈɡlisnɔ] is a village in the administrative district of Gmina Sulęcin, within Sulęcin County, Lubusz Voivodeship, in western Poland.
