= Miechów, Lubusz Voivodeship =

Miechów
- Village
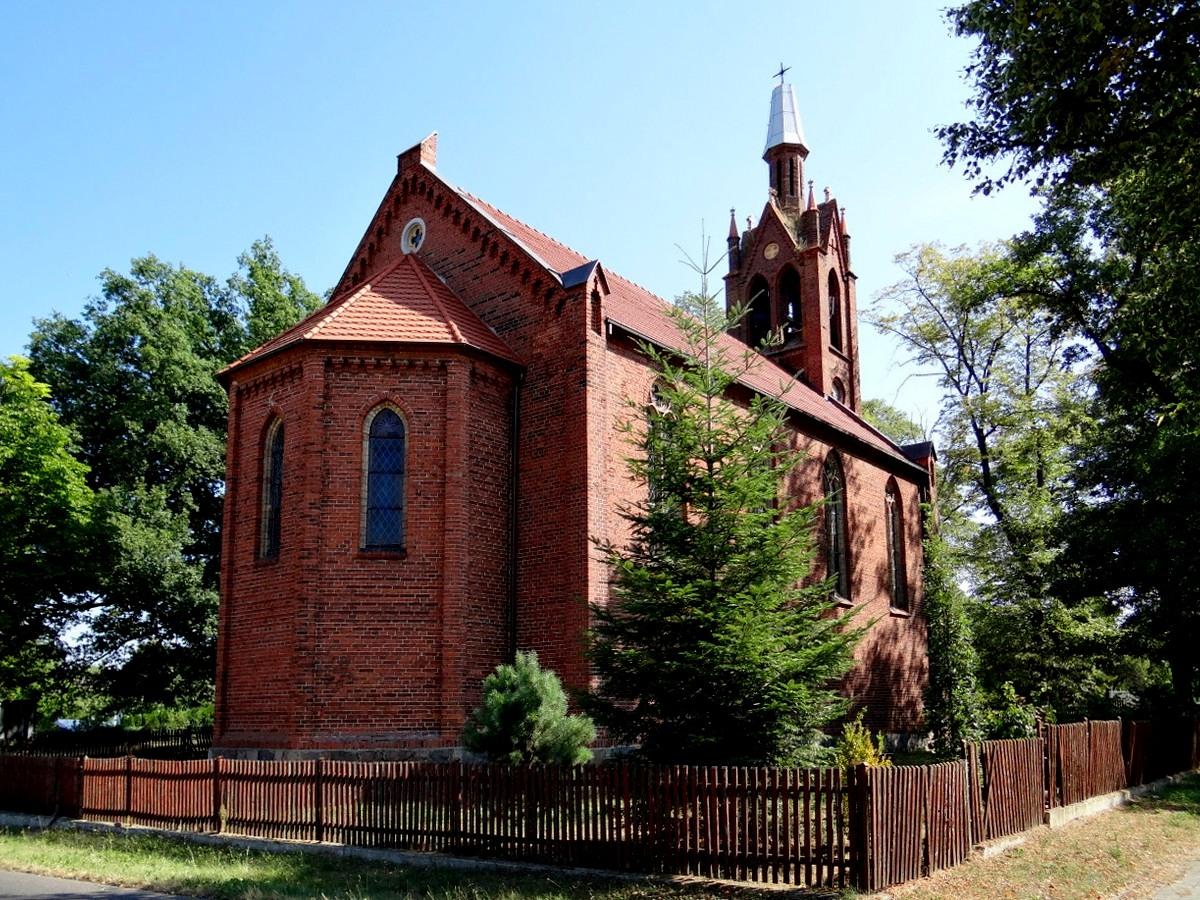
- Catholic church

- Location within Poland
- Coordinates: 52°30′N 15°9′E
- Country: Poland
- Voivodeship: Lubusz
- County: Sulęcin
- Gmina: Sulęcin
- Time zone: UTC+1 (CET)
  - Summer (DST): UTC+2 (CEST)
- Vehicle registration: FSU

Miechów [ˈmjɛxuf] is a village in the administrative district of Gmina Sulęcin, within Sulęcin County, Lubusz Voivodeship, in western Poland.
