= Małuszów, Lubusz Voivodeship =

Małuszów
- Village
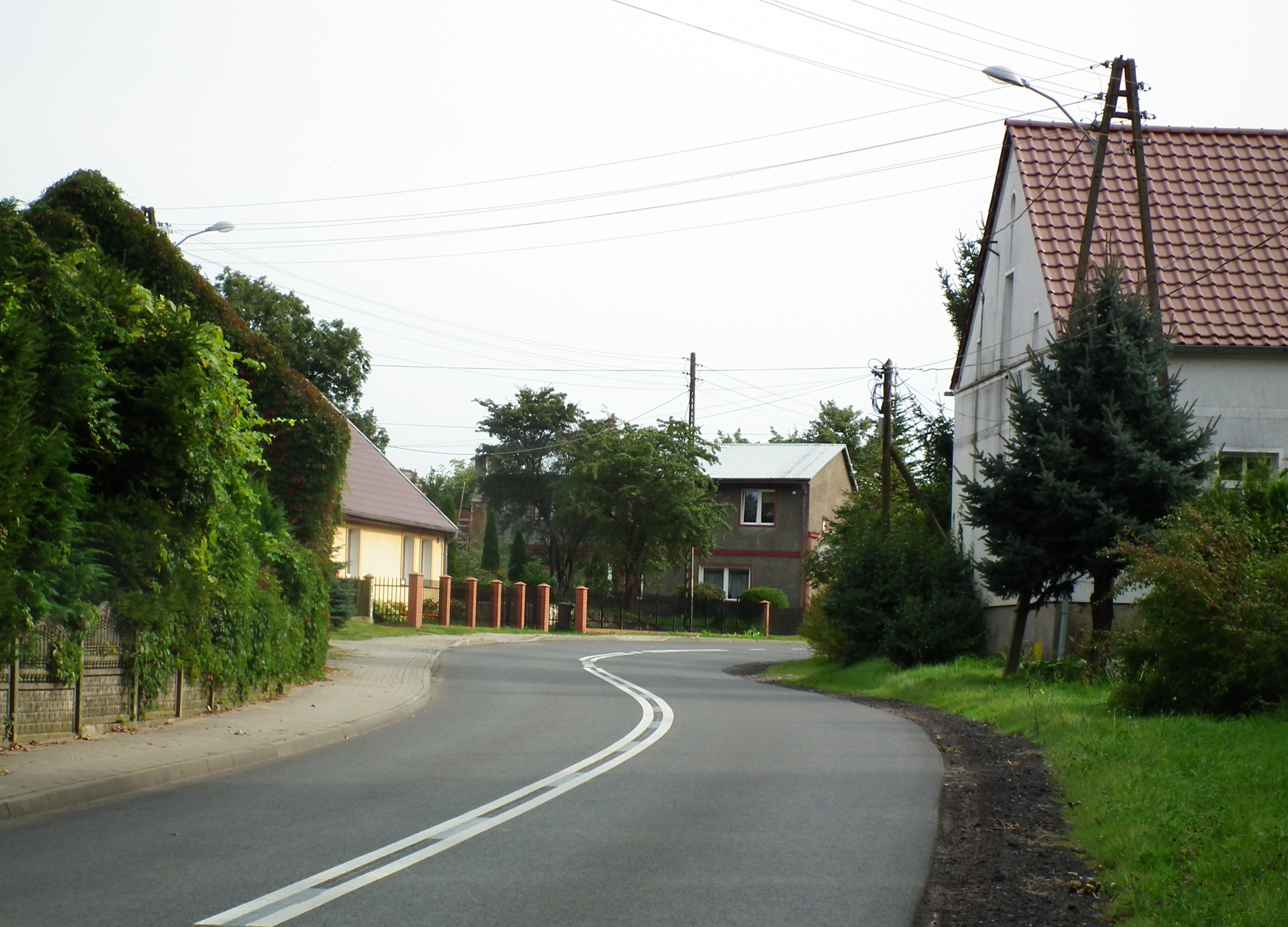

- Location within Poland
- Coordinates: 52°22′N 15°8′E
- Country: Poland
- Voivodeship: Lubusz
- County: Sulęcin
- Gmina: Sulęcin
- Time zone: UTC+1 (CET)
  - Summer (DST): UTC+2 (CEST)
- Vehicle registration: FSU

Małuszów [maˈwuʂuf] is a village in the administrative district of Gmina Sulęcin, within Sulęcin County, Lubusz Voivodeship, in western Poland.

Two Polish citizens were murdered by Nazi Germany in the village during World War II.
