= Clavibacter insidiosus =

Scientific classification
- Domain: Bacteria
- Kingdom: Bacillati
- Phylum: Actinomycetota
- Class: Actinomycetes
- Order: Micrococcales
- Family: Microbacteriaceae
- Genus: Clavibacter
- Species: C. insidiosus

Binomial name
- Clavibacter insidiosus (McCulloch 1925) Li et al. 2018

Synonyms
- "Aplanobacter insidiosum" McCulloch 1925; Clavibacter michiganensis subsp. insidiosum (McCulloch 1925) Davis et al. 1984; Clavibacter michiganense subsp. insidiosum (McCulloch 1925) Davis et al. 1984; Clavibacter michiganensis subsp. insidiosus corrig. (McCulloch 1925) Davis et al. 1984; Corynebacterium insidiosum (McCulloch 1925) Jensen 1934 (Approved Lists 1980); Corynebacterium michiganense subsp. insidiosum (McCulloch 1925) Carlson and Vidaver 1982

Species of bacterium

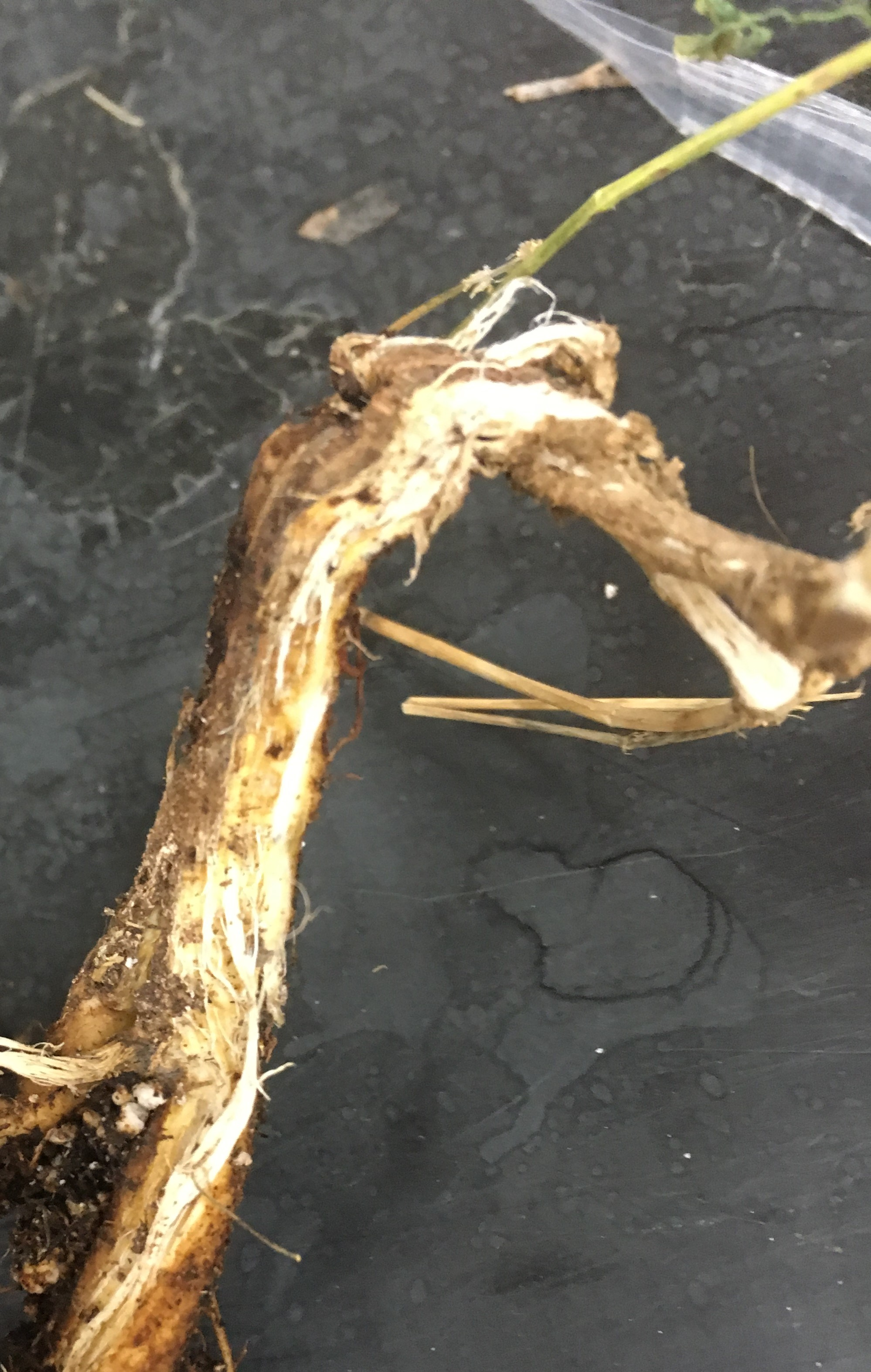
Alfalfa root infected with Clavibacter michiganensis subsp. insidiosus

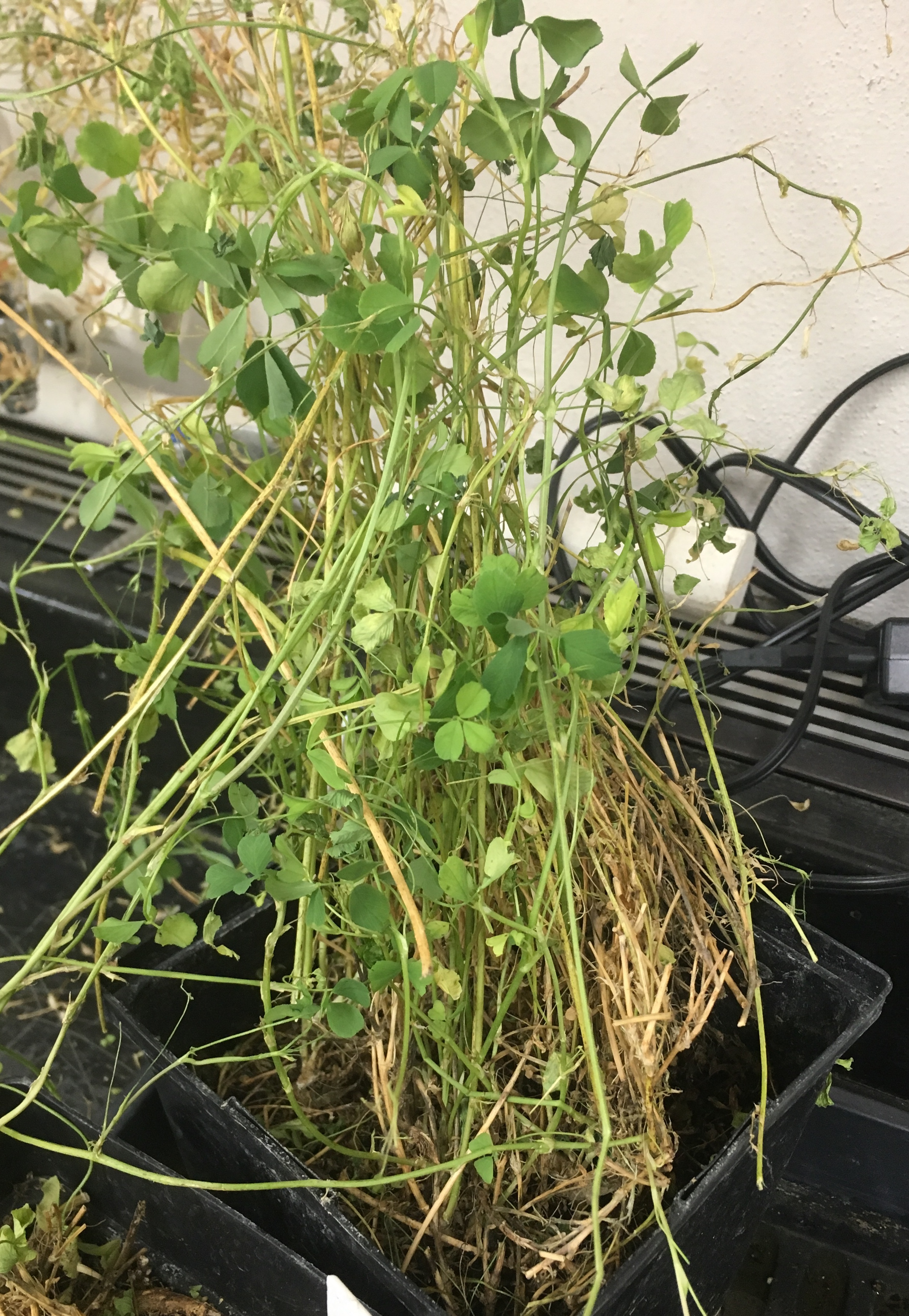
Alfalfa with bacteria wilt caused by Clavibacter michiganensis subsp. insidiosus

Clavibacter insidiosus is a species of Clavibacter. It causes bacterial wilt, with its most notable host being Medicago sativa (alfalfa). Other species in the Medicago genus are also known to be hosts such as Medicago falcata. Additionally, Lotus corniculatus, Melilotus alba, Onobrychis viciifolia, and Trifolium sp. are known hosts.

== Pathology ==
Plants like alfalfa are often mowed, and this causes cut stems. The cut stems increase disease susceptibility be providing wounds for the bacteria to enter. C. insidiosus causes a systemic disease: the leaflets curl up, an indicative symptom of this disease. Occasionally, it causes necrosis of the leaflets. Yellowing of the plant and yellow-brown roots often occurs. This disease is either fatal or causes severe damage to the host with the bacteria leading to stunted growth. C. insidiosus needs to be cultured from the infected plant tissues and PCR-tests must be run to confirm a diagnosis.

Clavibacter insidiosus is typically dispersed by the moving of hay between different agricultural sites. Farm equipment that is not properly sanitized can also spread the pathogen. Water is known to move the bacterium; if an area in not irrigated and there is low rainfall, the disease will usually not be present. Plant wounds, specifically on the stem or roots, increase disease susceptibility (because there is now wound for the bacteria to enter) and are often made by mowing, nematodes, or insects. Stem nematodes often act as a vector. They can carry the bacteria on their surface. If the plant is infected by root-knot nematodes, bacterial wilt is more likely and typically more severe. Infested soil can additionally cause disease. A small number of diseased plants (about 6.3-7.7%) can transmit the bacterium to their seeds.
