= Lidophia graminis =

Twist fungus

Scientific classification
- Kingdom: Fungi
- Division: Ascomycota
- Class: Dothideomycetes
- Order: Dothideales
- Genus: Lidophia
- Species: L. graminis

Binomial name
- Lidophia graminis (Sacc.) J. Walker & B. Sutton

Synonyms
- Dilophia graminis Sacc.; Dilophospora alopecuri (Fr.) Bessey; Dilophospora graminis Fuckel; Metasphaeria graminis (Sacc.) Cooke

Species of fungus

Lidophia graminis, twist fungus, is a fungus found in southern Australia, northern Europe, and the United States. Recent research by scientists from Western Australia has found the fungus is capable of controlling organisms that cause the disease of livestock known as annual ryegrass toxicity. An inoculum of the fungus was developed.
