= Brzeźno, Sulęcin County =

Brzeźno
- Village
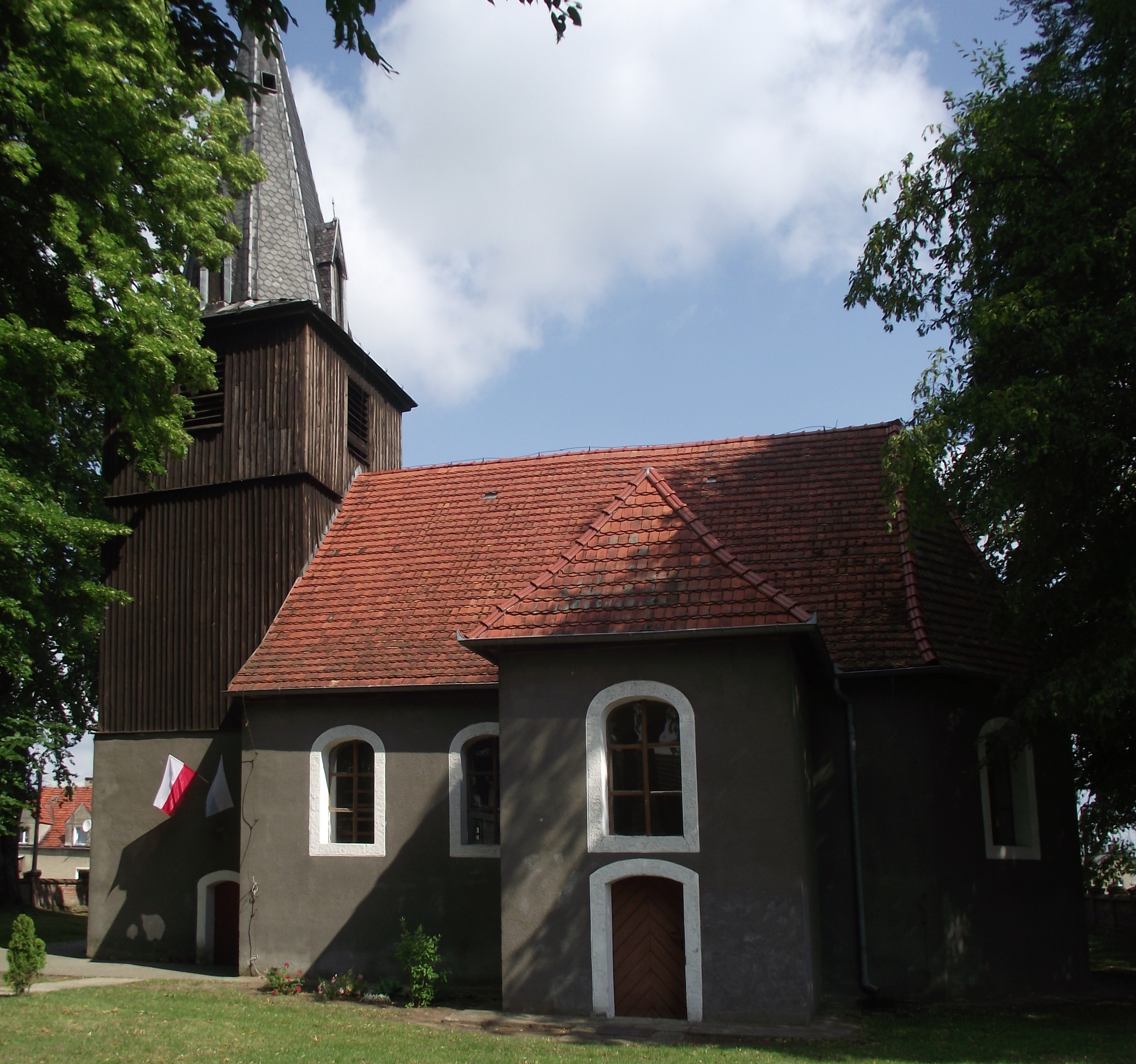
- Church in Brzeźno

- Location within Poland
- Coordinates: 52°25′30″N 15°4′12″E
- Country: Poland
- Voivodeship: Lubusz
- County: Sulęcin
- Gmina: Sulęcin

Brzeźno [ˈbʐɛʑnɔ] is a village in the administrative district of Gmina Sulęcin, within Sulęcin County, Lubusz Voivodeship, in western Poland.
