= ATUM =

American biotechnology company

- Company type: Private
- Industry: Biotechnology
- Founded: 2003
- Founders: Sridhar Govindarajan, Claes Gustafsson, Jeremy Minshull, Jon Ness
- Headquarters: Newark, California, United States
- Products: Artificial gene synthesis, protein engineering, protein production, bioinformatics, cell line development, transposases

ATUM is an American biotechnology contract research organization (CRO) headquartered in Newark, California, United States. Founded in 2003 as DNA2.0, the company provides cell line development, protein engineering, protein expression and gene synthesis services for the development of biotherapeutics, proteins, and genes. It primarily services biotechnology, pharmaceutical, academia, and government clients.

== History ==
ATUM (formerly DNA2.0) was founded in 2003, in Menlo Park, California. DNA2.0 began as a gene synthesis company, and was one of the first companies to apply machine learning and large language models to applications in biotechnology, specifically in gene synthesis. It developed codon optimization strategies, designed to leverage the redundancy in the genetic code to optimize protein expression when the gene was translated. In 2009, The Scientist named the codon design algorithms (later trademarked as GeneGPS) developed by DNA2.0 as one of the "Top 10 Innovations" of the year for life sciences. Gene synthesis rapidly replaced molecular cloning for many academic and corporate labs, as "foundries for the biotechnology age" allowing made-to-order genes for biological research. DNA2.0 was featured on the PBS show Nova ScienceNow to show how genes are created synthetically in a lab. In 2008, the company supplied some of the DNA stretches used to create a synthetic bacterial genome. Dan Rather Reports included DNA2.0 in their episode on synthetic biology and how the field is solving "some of the most important problems facing the world."

The company's services expanded in 2015 to incorporate protein expression capabilities. In 2016, the company acquired MIGS (Molecular Immunology General Solutions), a New Hampshire-based company that used machine learning strategies to express antibodies. After that acquisition, DNA2.0 changed its name to ATUM.

The company is privately held and continues to have all research, development and production in California, currently in their 50,000 sq ft Newark facilities.

GeneGPS underpins all gene design, protein expression, and cell line development projects at ATUM, as they are designed to optimize expression in downstream applications. ProteinGPS (analogous machine learning/AI for protein expression and characteristics) are specialized protein engineering services to optimize antibody and enzyme characteristics.

== Key Products ==
- Leap-In Transposase: Transposases perfectly integrate genes of interest into host cell lines, which increased expression and eliminated the potential for incorrectly integrated proteins, which was a problem for random integration methods. ATUM pioneered the application of transposase systems in the manufacture of biologics. Leap-In Transposase was the first widespread, commercial use of a transposon-based integration and has enabled the manufacture of 54 Investigational New Drugs as of May 2026.
- miCHO: a CHO-K1 cell line designed to as a host for Leap-In transposase integration.
- discoCHO: a CHO-K1 transient expression system designed to mimic manufacturing grade cell lines, allowing critical quality attributes to be identified and tracked prior to manufacturing development.
- Lock-In: a bispecific antibody platform engineered to overcome light chain mispairing.
- lightningHEK: a HEK-based transient antibody expression service designed for screening and early characterization of antibody sequences, including the translation of virtual sequences to expressible protein, in small amounts suitable for high-throughput developability testing.
- Electra Vector System: a universal cloning system that utilizes the type IIS restriction enzyme SapI and T4 DNA ligase in a single-tube reaction.
- ProteinPaintbox: chromogenic, synthetic fluorescent proteins derived via ProteinGPS applications, available in open-access collections of DNA parts (BioBricks Foundation).
- There are over 4,200 published scientific articles using ATUM products and/or services, of which at least 50 include company employees as authors.

== Research tools ==
- Gene Designer is a free bioinformatics software package. It is used by molecular biologists to design, clone and validate genetic sequences.
- A free gRNA design tool with scoring algorithms for CRISPR.
- DNA ATLAS is a free plasmid mapping tool to show features such as promoters, markers, restriction sites and open reading frames in any DNA vector sequence.
- The online Bioinformatics toolbox was selected as a Best of the Web by Genetic Engineering News.

== Partnerships ==
- The Perelman School of Medicine at the University of Pennsylvania will use the GeneGPS technology developed by ATUM primarily to support the Gene Therapy Program's work on HIV-1 vaccine development by optimizing in vivo protein expression.
- The Infection and Immunity Research Centre at St. George's, University of London and Atum partnered to develop plant-based pharmaceuticals.
- Adimab LLC. and ATUM employ an alliance in the area of antibody discovery and biomanufacturing via the design and construction of antibody libraries.
- Cytovance Biologics utilizes GeneGPS from ATUM as part of their Keystone Expression System for microbial strain development for successful biomanufacturing.
- Archer Daniels Midland Company applies ATUM's proprietary protein engineering technology, ProteinGPS, to ADM's industrial enzyme engineering processes.
- ATUM is a sponsor of BioBuilder, a resource for hands-on activities and informative animations on synthetic biology for middle school and high school students and teachers; founded by Dr. Natalie Kuldell at MIT.
