= Grzeszów =

- Village
- Location within Poland
- Coordinates: 52°26′13″N 15°05′36″E
- Country: Poland
- Voivodeship: Lubusz
- County: Sulęcin
- Gmina: Sulęcin

Grzeszów [ˈɡʐɛʂuf] is a village in the administrative district of Gmina Sulęcin, within Sulęcin County, Lubusz Voivodeship, in western Poland.
