= Trzebów, Sulęcin County =

Trzebów
- Village
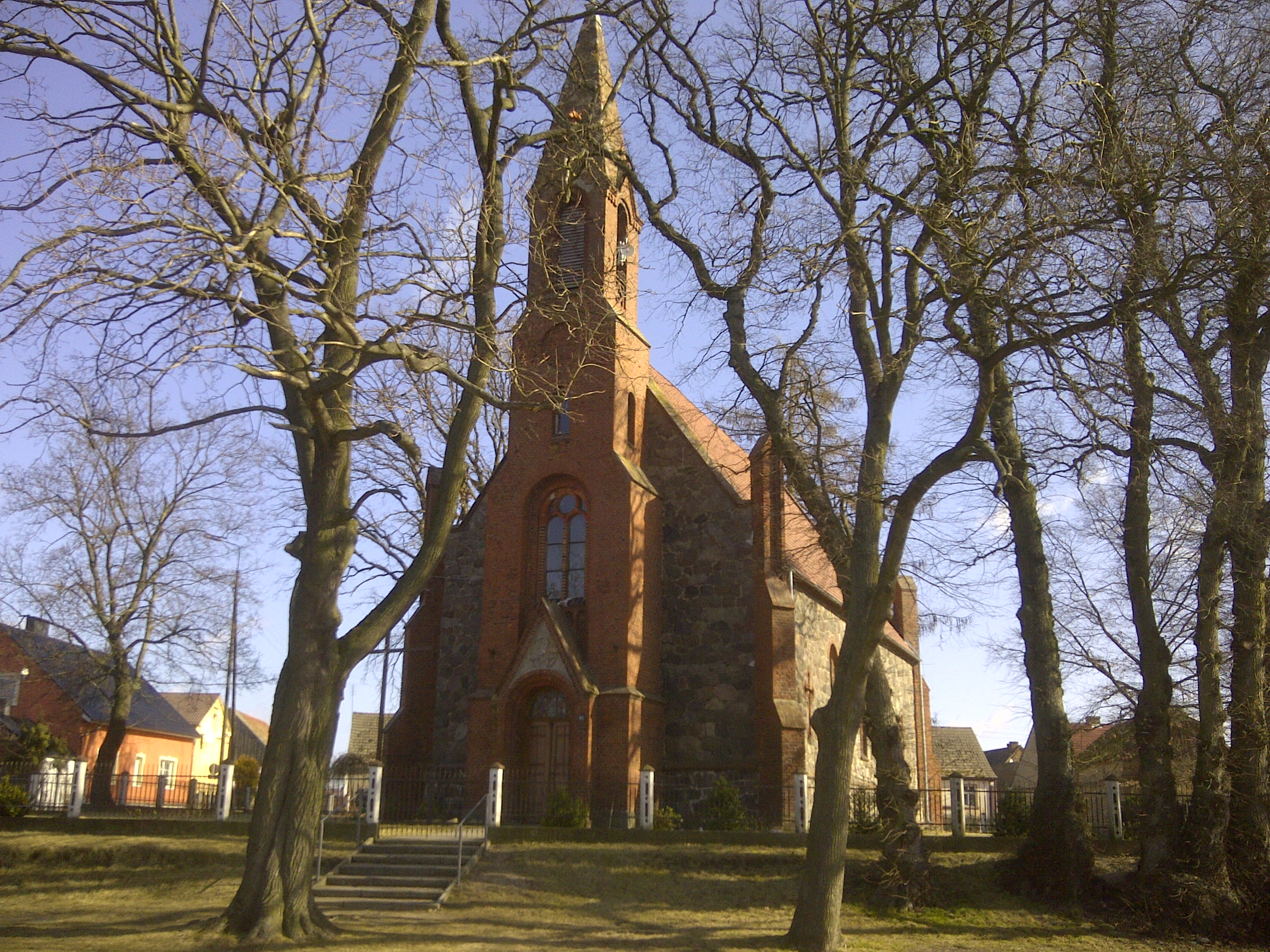

- Location within Poland
- Coordinates: 52°30′17″N 15°01′12″E
- Country: Poland
- Voivodeship: Lubusz
- County: Sulęcin
- Gmina: Sulęcin

Trzebów [ˈtʂɛbuf] is a village in the administrative district of Gmina Sulęcin, within Sulęcin County, Lubusz Voivodeship, in western Poland.
