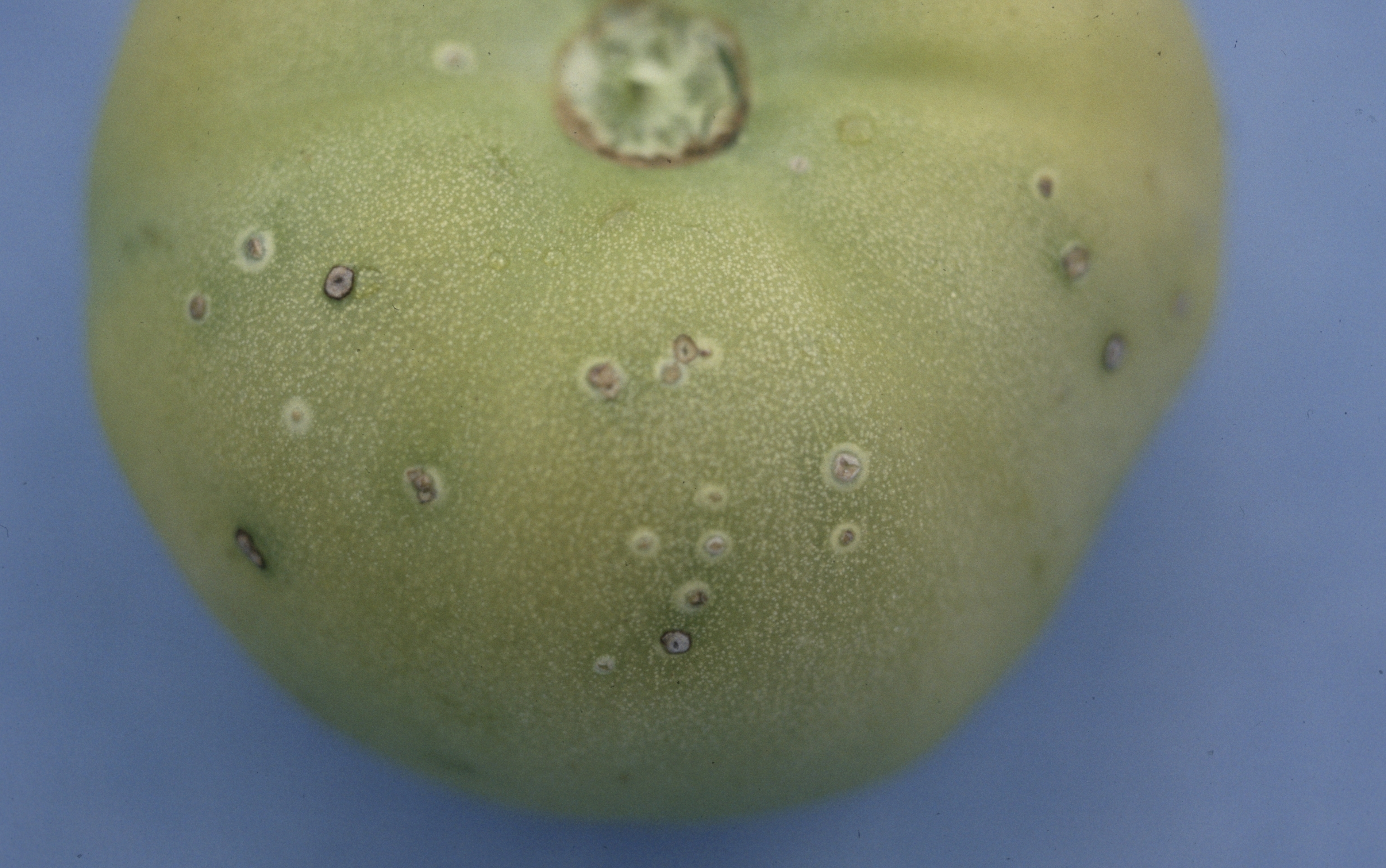
- Symptoms of Clavibacter michiganensis on tomato

Scientific classification
- Domain: Bacteria
- Kingdom: Bacillati
- Phylum: Actinomycetota
- Class: Actinomycetes
- Order: Micrococcales
- Family: Microbacteriaceae
- Genus: Clavibacter
- Species: C. michiganensis

Binomial name
- Clavibacter michiganensis corrig. (Smith 1910) Davis et al. 1984

Subspecies
- C. m. subsp. californiensis Yasuhara-Bell and Alvarez 2015; C. m. subsp. chilensis Yasuhara-Bell and Alvarez 2015; C. m. subsp. michiganensis corrig. (Smith 1910) Davis et al. 1984; C. m. subsp. phaseoli González and Trapiello 2014

Synonyms
- Aplanobacter michiganense [sic] (Smith 1910) Smith 1914; Bacterium michiganense Smith 1910; Corynebacterium michiganense (Smith 1910) Jensen 1934; Mycobacterium flavum subsp. michiganense (Smith 1910) Krasil’nikov 1941; Phytomonas michiganensis (Smith 1910) Bergey et al. 1923; Pseudomonas michiganensis (Smith 1910) Stevens 1913

= Clavibacter michiganensis =

Species of bacterium

Clavibacter michiganensis is an aerobic non-sporulating Gram-positive plant pathogenic actinomycete of the genus Clavibacter. Clavibacter michiganensis has several subspecies. Clavibacter michiganensis subsp. michiganensis causes substantial economic losses worldwide by damaging tomatoes and potatoes.

== Context ==
Clavibacter michiganensis, also known as Ring Rot, is an unusual genus of phytopathogenic bacteria in that it is gram-positive and does not have a type three secretion system. All Clavibacter species and subspecies have a type B2γ cell wall crosslinked at a diaminobutyrate residue. Clavibacter is an aerobic bacterium with a coryneform morphology. There is no mycelium and no spores are produced.

Clavibacter michiganensis infects the primary host in one of three ways: wounds, hydathodes, or by contaminated seed. If the bacteria reach a suitable quorum, the result is a systemic vascular infection. In the first stages of invasion, C. michiganensis resides as a biotrophic pathogen in the xylem vessels.

Clavibacter has a complex history of taxonomical names. For a long time, there was only one recognized species within the genus Clavibacter. There are nine subspecies within the michiganensis species. Recently, some strains have been reclassified into other genera. This complex history stems from the difficulty in characterizing bacteria. Unlike fungi, the morphology of bacteria is not very sufficient for taxonomical purposes. To this end, strains of a phytopathogenic bacteria, called pathovars, are distinguished by cultural (selective media), physiological, biochemical (e.g. secreted enzymes the chemical responses of the plant), or pathological characteristics (including the range of susceptible hosts).

Recently, two strains of this bacteria – subsp. sepidonicum and subsp. michiganensis – have had their genomes sequenced and annotated. There is still much to discover about this pathogen-host interaction but now that the genome has been sequenced, the rate of discoveries will likely increase. One of the main goals pertaining to research of these bacterial genomes is to develop resistant varieties. Unfortunately, no resistant varieties have yet been found.

== Genetics ==
The species has a single chromosome.

== C. m. subsp. michiganensis ==
C. m. subsp. michiganensis is the causative agent of bacterial wilt and canker of tomato (Lycopersicon esculentum).

=== Hosts and symptoms ===
When the infection occurs in an early stage of the tomato plant there may be wilting on leaves because Clavibacter michiganensis subsp. michiganensis enter the plant by wounds, including root wounds, and if the bacterium gets to the xylem then a systemic infection is likely that may plug the xylem vessels. The wilting may only show on one side of the leaf and may recover during cooler periods. The entire system of xylem within the plant allows the bacteria to form titers of up to 10^{9} bacteria per gram of plant tissue. Wilting may eventually spread to all leaves and these leaves, along with their petioles, may also show distorted, curled growth. One way to diagnose a severe vascular infection is to pinch the stem. If the epidermis and outer layer of the cortex separate from the inner stem then there is severe vascular infection. These exposed parts will have a soapy feel. Canker lesions, though rare, may develop on the stem. These cankers are necrotic regions where the epidermis is gone. As the bacteria continues its colonization, the canker will deepen and expand. In terms of fruit development, tomatoes may fail to develop altogether or may look marbled because they are ripening unevenly.

If infection occurs at a late stage of plant development, plants are able to survive and generate fruits. However, the plant may appear stressed rather than wilted and may develop white interveinal areas that will develop into brown necrotic tissue. Often the seeds are infected as well.

Superficial infections increase the risk of epidemics. They occur when the bacteria multiply on the epidermis of the host, enter through stomata, or enter through a very shallow wound that does not allow the pathogen to reach the xylem tissue. The host may look like it was rubbed with cornmeal or coarse flour but it is actually a series of blisters that me be raised or sunken and appear white to pale orange. The most common leaf symptom is a dark brown spot surrounded by a sort of orange-like area on the edge of the leaf. Fruits may develop "bird's eye" spotting, which are pale green to white raised pustules that have a brown center and chlorotic halo. Pictures of these symptoms are available at the cited reference.

However, latent infections are common.

The Clavibacter michiganensis subsp. michiganensis wild type strain NCPPB382 carries two plasmids associated with virulence: pCM1 and pCM2. The avirulent strain, CMM100, does not contain these plasmids. Strains that carried one of the two plasmids were found to be virulent but wilting symptoms were delayed. The virulent and avirulent strains produced the same amount of exopolysaccharides, suggesting that EPS does not play a significant role in pathogenicity.

=== Disease cycle ===
The causal agent of bacterial wilt and canker of tomato survives in or on seeds for up to 8 months but occasionally also in plant refuse in the soil. The pathogen can be spread long distances because of its association with seeds. The risk of spreading the bacteria to healthy tomato plants is greatest during transplanting, tying, and suckering or any time when the host may be wounded. Once the bacteria enters the plant through a wound, it will move and multiply primarily in the xylem vessels. Once established, the bacteria may move into the phloem, pith, and cortex. Infection can result in either systemic or superficial disease. Systemic infections appear in 3–6 weeks and the risk of secondary infection goes up with water-splashing. The common occurrence of latent infections – presence of the pathogen within the host yet the host shows no symptoms – makes this pathogen especially dangerous.

However, the assumption that C. michiganensis does not overwinter in the soil is not without controversy. The genome of C. michiganesis has recently been sequenced and new theories will surely arise once more work has been completed. What is known is that Cmm can use hydrolysis products as carbon and energy sources by means of a number of ATP-binding cassette transporters and α- and β-glucosidases. This suggests that Cmm can survive in the soil as long as there is decaying host material present. It has also been determined that the genome of subsp. michiganensis does not have genes that encode for nitrate and nitrate reductases. This means that the bacteria depends on previously reduced nitrogen compounds or amino acids for its nitrogen source. Also lacking in the Cmm genome are genes for assimilatory sulfate reduction, which is associated with an auxotrophy for methionine – one of two amino acids that contain sulphur.

Cmm has a pathogenicity island (PI) that is encoded in the chromosome and is probably associated with colonization and plant defense evasion or suppression. This island has been subdivided into two subregions: chp and tomA. Serine proteases of the families S1A, Ppa, and PpA-E are encoded in the chp subregion as well as subtilase SbtA.

=== Environment ===
Warm temperature in the range of 23–28 °C (73–82 °F) and the high relative humidity (>80%) are optimal environments for Clavibacter michiganesis subsp. michiganesis, a tomato bacterial canker symptom development. In humid or wet weather, slimy masses of bacteria ooze through the cracks to the surface of the stem, from which they are spread to leaves and fruits and cause secondary infections Infected host plants will show severe symptoms on hot days when there is a high transpiration rate since the bacteria may plug the xylem vessels.

=== Management ===
The best way to control a disease is use of healthy seeds that have already been acid extracted. In addition, using chemical treatments such as copper hydroxide or streptomycin in the seed bed, removing or isolating diseased crops can be helpful to reduce the rate of infection.
