= Vector NTI =

Software package

- Developer: Life Technologies
- Stable release: Vector NTI Express v1.1.1 (Mac & Windows); Vector NTI Advance v11.5.2 (Windows & Mac w/PC Emulation) / September 20, 2012
- Operating system: Microsoft Windows XP, Windows 7
- Type: Molecular biology Suite of Sequence Analysis & Design Software Tools (Curate, Discover, Design, Provision, Confirm)
- License: Proprietary
- Website: Vector NTI home

Vector NTI was a commercial bioinformatics software package used by many life scientists in the early 2000s to work, among other things, with nucleic acids and proteins in silico. It allowed researchers to, for example, plan a DNA cloning experiment on the computer before actually performing it in the lab.

It was originally created by InforMax Inc, North Bethesda, MD in 1993 and versions in the early 2000s were well reviewed at the time. However, in 2008 it was locked and turned into a commercial software after 2008 which created problems for locked in users who were forced to buy the software to continue accessing their data on newer computers. What was previously a single software package was subsequently split into Vector NTI Express, Advanced, and Express Designer.

Vector NTI was discontinued by its corporate parent Thermo Fisher at the end of 2019 and support ceased a year later.

== Features ==
- create, annotate, analyse, and share DNA/protein sequences
- perform and save BLAST searches
- design primers for PCR, cloning, sequencing or hybridisation experiments
- plan cloning and run gels in silico
- align multiple protein or DNA sequences
- search NCBI's Entrez, view, and save DNAs, proteins, and citations
- edit chromatogram data, assemble into contigs

== See also ==
- Bioinformatics
- Cloning vector
- Computational biology
- Expression vector
- List of open source bioinformatics software
- Restriction map
- Vector (molecular biology)
- Vector DNA
