= Rychlik, Lubusz Voivodeship =

Rychlik
- Village
- Location within Poland
- Coordinates: 52°24′N 15°4′E
- Country: Poland
- Voivodeship: Lubusz
- County: Sulęcin
- Gmina: Sulęcin

Rychlik [ˈrɨxlik] is a village in the administrative district of Gmina Sulęcin, within Sulęcin County, Lubusz Voivodeship, in western Poland.
