= Rychlicki =

Rychlicki (feminine: Rychlicka) is a Polish surname. It may be either a toponymic or patronymic surname derived from a location named Rychlik, or a nickname or given name derived from the word rychły, "quick". Notable people with the surname include:

- Kamil Rychlicki (born 1996), Luxembourgish volleyball player
- Teresa Rychlicka-Kasprzyk (born 1950), Polish volleyball player
- Zbigniew Rychlicki (1922–1989), Polish graphic artist, illustrator of children's books
