= Podbiele, Lubusz Voivodeship =

Podbiele
- Settlement
- Location within Poland
- Coordinates: 52°27′5″N 15°17′56″E
- Country: Poland
- Voivodeship: Lubusz
- County: Sulęcin
- Gmina: Sulęcin

Podbiele [pɔdˈbjɛlɛ] is a settlement in the administrative district of Gmina Sulęcin, within Sulęcin County, Lubusz Voivodeship, in western Poland.
