= Netprimer =

Web-based tool for analysing primers used in PCR to amplify a DNA sequence

NetPrimer
- Developer: Premier Biosoft
- Stable release: 1.10 / 6 May 2002
- Platform: Java applet
- Type: Bioinformatics
- License: commercial
- Website: http://www.premierbiosoft.com/netprimer/

NetPrimer is a gratis web-based tool used for analysing primers used in PCR to amplify a DNA sequence. The software predicts the melting temperature of the primers using the nearest neighbor thermodynamic algorithm. The accurate prediction of the melting temperature (Tm) is one of the most important factors that governs the success of a PCR reaction.

NetPrimer also analyzes the thermodynamically important secondary structures such as hairpins, self and cross dimers, runs and repeats. These structures significantly affect the primer efficiency and therefore the success of a PCR reaction.

NetPrimer can be used to determine the best primer pairs for a given set of experimental conditions. The program assigns a rating to each primer analyzed. The rating is based on the proximity of the thermodynamic parameters to their ideal scores.

In addition to the primer quality, its molecular weight and optical activity (both in nmol/A260 and μg/A260) are also presented for quantitation. Primers are analyzed for their GC% (Guanine-Cytosine content). This important parameter determines their annealing strength.

== Business model ==
Although Netprimer is provided without charge, it is not free software. Users must register for access and thereby receive advertising of Premier Biosoft's other products.
