= AlleleID =

Oligo-designing software

- Developer(s): PREMIER Biosoft
- Stable release: 7.80 / 29 June 2013
- Operating system: Windows, Macintosh
- Type: Bioinformatics
- License: commercial
- Website: http://www.premierbiosoft.com

AlleleID designs oligos for strain differentiation and taxa specific assays. This aids in bacterial identification, pathogen detection and species identification. The software is designed to run on Windows and Macintosh operating system.

AlleleID aligns sequences to locate differences in DNA and to find conserved regions and then designs oligos to amplify and detect only the species or strains of interest from the mix. The platforms for which AlleleID includes support are:

1. Quantitative PCR: Designs species specific and taxa specific qPCR assays
2. Microarrays: Designs species specific and taxa specific microarrays
3. xMAP: Designs oligos for Direct Hybridization Assays (DHA) and ASPE assays
4. MLPA: Designs probes for copy number detection and SNP studies
