= Józef Kowalski (supercentenarian) =

Polish soldier

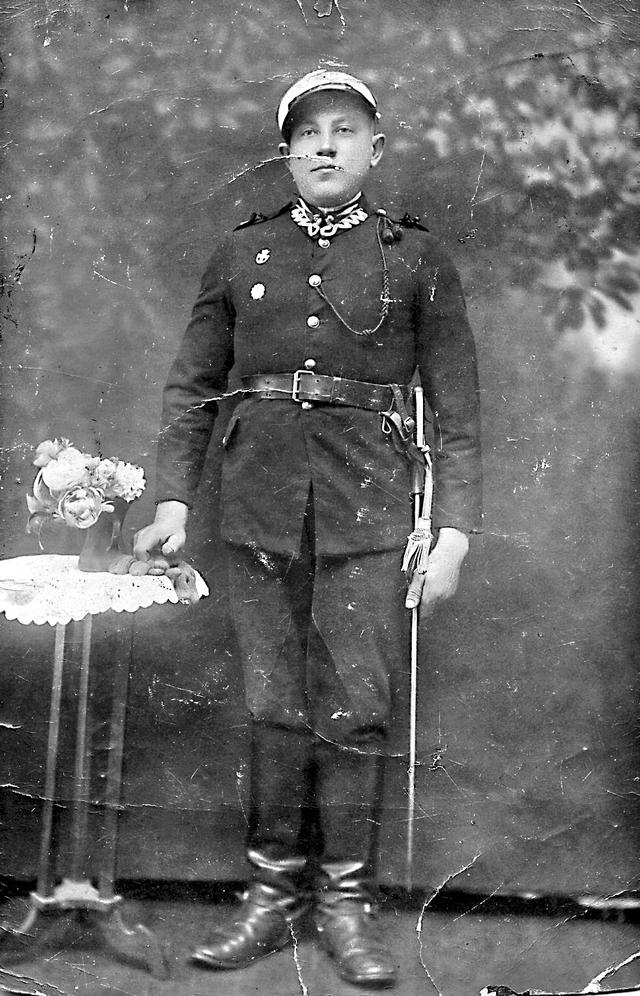
- Born: 2 February 1900; Wicyń, Kingdom of Galicia and Lodomeria, Austria-Hungary (now Ukraine)
- Died: 7 December 2013 (aged 113 years, 308 days); Tursk, Lubusz Voivodeship, Poland
- Military career
- Allegiance: Poland
- Branch: Polish Army
- Service years: 1919–1921; 1939
- Rank: Captain
- Unit: 22nd Regiment Ułanów
- Conflicts: Polish-Soviet War; Battle of Warsaw; Battle of Komarów; Second World War; Invasion of Poland
- Awards: Order of Polonia Restituta; "Pro Memoria" Medal

Józef Kowalski (2 February 1900 – 7 December 2013) was a Polish supercentenarian claimant, who was the last surviving military veteran of the Polish-Soviet War.

== Biography ==
Kowalski was born in Wicyń, Galicia, Austria-Hungary (now Ukraine) and was a military veteran who served in the Polish Army in the 22nd Uhlan Regiment. He served in several important battles of the war, including the Battle of Warsaw and Battle of Komarów. In World War II, he took part in the September Campaign. After being captured he was held in a concentration camp.

On 2 February 2010, his claimed 110th birthday, he was awarded the Officer's Cross of the Order of Polonia Restituta for his war service by Polish President Lech Kaczyński He lived in Tursk, near Sulęcin, in western Poland a care home.

On 23 February 2012 Kowalski was promoted to the rank of kapitan, and on 16 August 2012 he was nominated to become an honorary citizen of the city of Wołomin, having already become an honorary citizen of both Warsaw and Radzymin.
