= Restriction map =

Diagram of restriction sites within a DNA sequence

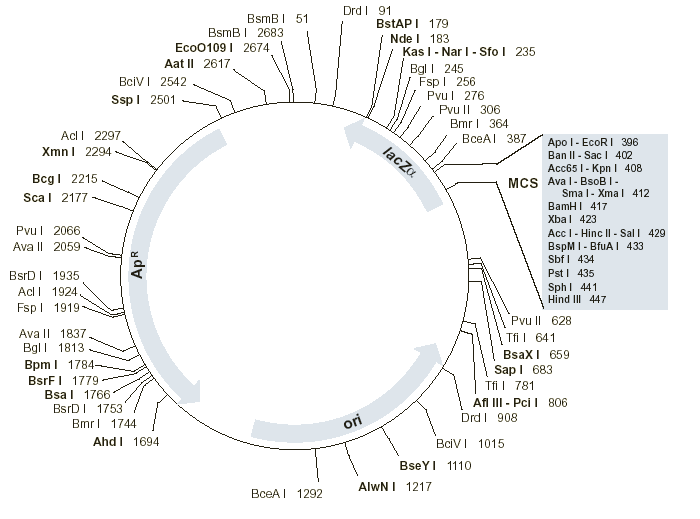
Restriction map of the pUC19 cloning vector. Total length: 2686 bp

A restriction map is a map of known restriction sites within a sequence of DNA. Restriction sites are sites on DNA where restriction enzymes, can cut the DNA at or near the site. In molecular biology, restriction maps are used as a reference to make plasmids or other relatively short pieces of DNA, and sometimes for longer genomic DNA.

== History ==
One of the 1978 recipients of the Nobel Prize for the discovery of restriction enzymes and their applications, Daniel Nathans, introduced the use of restriction enzymes to map genomes. He was the first to apply restriction enzymes to cutting DNA at specific sites and was able to use this technique to map the genome of the SV40 virus. His work enabled gene mapping, cloning, and development of prenatal tests for genetic diseases.

Before sequencing was automated, it was expensive to sequence an entire DNA strand. To find the relative positions of restriction sites on a plasmid, a technique involving single and double restriction digests is used. Based on the sizes of the resultant DNA fragments the positions of the sites can be estimated. Restriction mapping is a very useful technique when used for determining the orientation of an insert in a cloning vector, by mapping the position of an off-center restriction site in the insert.

== Method ==
There are several valid approaches to construct a restriction map of a DNA sequence. One approach is to sequence the whole molecule and to run the sequence through a computer program that will find the recognition sites that are present for every restriction enzyme known. However, restriction maps are traditionally determined by gel electrophoresis. There are other ways of mapping features on DNA for longer length DNA molecules, such as mapping by transduction.

== Applications ==
- Verifying cloning experiments. After inserting DNA into a vector, cutting the vector with known restriction enzymes is expected to produce fragments of predictable sizes. If the experimental fragment sizes match the predicted restriction map, the cloning experiment was successful.
- Mapping of small genomes. Using restriction maps, researchers were able to determine the relative location of genes in small genomes, such as those of plasmids, viruses, and organelles.
- Optical whole-genome mapping. Researchers can directly image restriction sites to create physical whole chromosome and whole genome maps.

== See also ==
- Vector NTI, bioinformatics software used among other things to predict restriction sites on a DNA vector
- RFLP, method used to differentiate exceedingly similar genomes, among other things
