= Wojciech Rychlik =

Wojciech Rychlik is a biologist and photographer, born in Poland and living in the USA since 1980. Rychlik received his Ph.D. in 1980 from the Polish Academy of Sciences. Currently, he is a president of Molecular Biology Insights, Inc. located in Cascade, Colorado.

The main focus of Rychlik's research was PCR primer design. He is known for developing the OLIGO Primer Analysis Software., the first software optimizing conditions for PCR. Before moving to the industry sector in 1991, he was instrumental in discovery of human protein synthesis initiation factor eIF-4 mRNA working as Assistant Res. Professor at the University of Kentucky, Lexington, Kentucky.

Rychlik is a nature photographer, member of the Photographic Society of America. In 2007 and 2008 he was the top-ranked exhibitor in PSA stereo electronic section. As a photographer he is better known as Wojtek Rychlik, who published books about Colorado Mountains. His first book was a 230-page atlas of mountain lakes in Colorado's Sangre de Cristo Mountains, "Lakes of the Sangres", and the most significant was a catalog of Front Range Mountains, a 572-page atlas "Eagle’s View of the Front Range". Some others are included in the References section.
