= Gmina Sulęcin =

Gmina Sulęcin Sulęcin Commune
- Gmina
- Flag Coat of arms
- Interactive map of Gmina Sulęcin
- Coordinates (Sulęcin): 52°27′N 15°7′E
- Country: Poland
- Voivodeship: Lubusz
- County: Sulęcin
- Seat: Sulęcin

Area
  - Total: 319.72 km^{2} (123.44 sq mi)

Population (2019-06-30)
  - Total: 15,767
  - Density: 49.315/km^{2} (127.73/sq mi)
  - Urban: 10,117
  - Rural: 5,650
- Website: http://www.sulecin.pl

Gmina Sulęcin is an urban-rural gmina (administrative district) in Sulęcin County, Lubusz Voivodeship, in western Poland. Its seat is the town of Sulęcin, which lies approximately 33 kilometres (21 mi) south of Gorzów Wielkopolski and 63 km (39 mi) north-west of Zielona Góra.

The gmina covers an area of 319.72 square kilometres (123.4 sq mi), and as of 2019 its total population is 15,767.

The gmina contains part of the protected area called Łagów Landscape Park.

== Villages ==
Apart from the town of Sulęcin, Gmina Sulęcin contains the villages and settlements of Brzeźno, Długoszyn, Długoszyn-Kolonia, Długoszynek, Drogomin, Glisno, Grochowo, Grzeszów, Małuszów, Miechów, Ostrów, Pamiątkowice, Podbiele, Rychlik, Trzebów, Trzemeszno Lubuskie, Tursk, Wędrzyn, Wielowieś, Żarzyn and Żubrów.

== Neighbouring gminas ==
Gmina Sulęcin is bordered by the gminas of Bledzew, Krzeszyce, Łagów, Lubniewice, Lubrza, Międzyrzecz, Ośno Lubuskie and Torzym.

== Twin towns – sister cities ==
Gmina Sulęcin is twinned with:

- Beeskow, Germany
- Friedland, Germany
- Kamen, Germany
- Nowy Tomyśl, Poland
