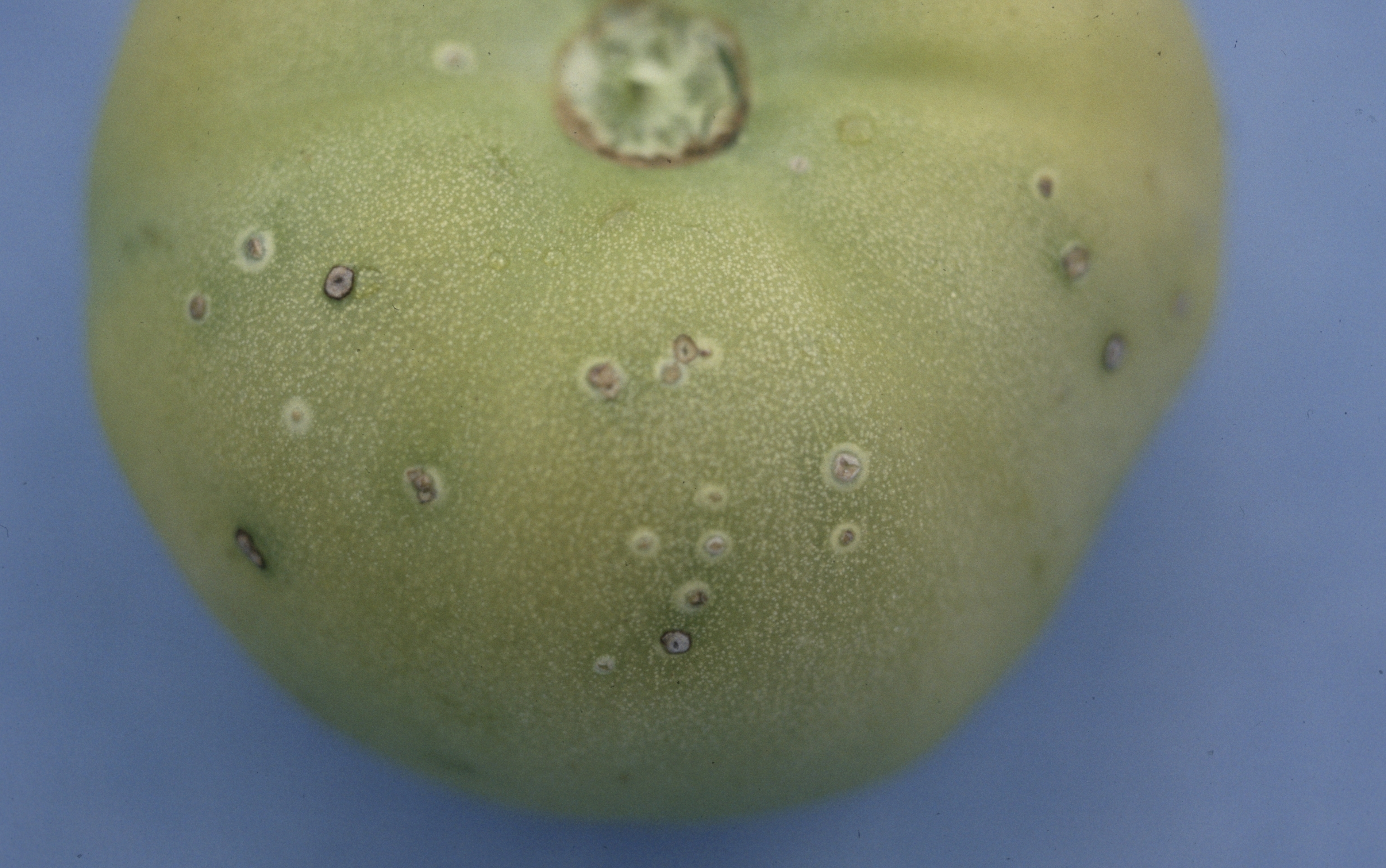
- Symptoms of Clavibacter michiganensis on tomato.

Scientific classification
- Domain: Bacteria
- Kingdom: Bacillati
- Phylum: Actinomycetota
- Class: Actinomycetes
- Order: Micrococcales
- Family: Microbacteriaceae
- Genus: Clavibacter; Davis et al. 1984

Type species
- Clavibacter michiganensis corrig. (Smith 1910) Davis et al. 1984

Species
- C. capsici (Oh et al. 2016) Li et al. 2018; C. insidiosus (McCulloch 1925) Li et al. 2018; C. michiganensis corrig. (Smith 1910) Davis et al. 1984; C. nebraskensis (Vidaver and Mandel 1974) Li et al. 2018; C. sepedonicus (Spieckermann and Kotthoff 1914) Li et al. 2018; C. tessellarius (Carlson and Vidaver 1982) Li et al. 2018; C. zhangzhiyongii Tian et al. 2021

= Clavibacter =

Genus of bacteria

Clavibacter is a genus of aerobic Gram-positive bacteria.
