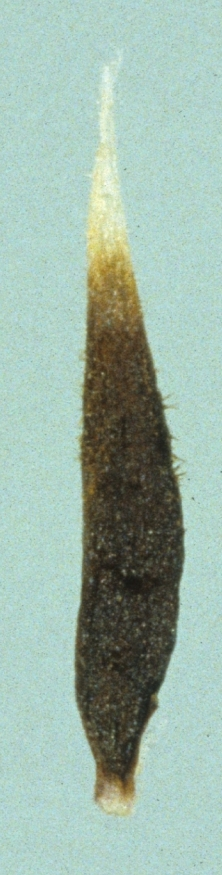
- gall made by Anguina funesta

Scientific classification
- Domain: Eukaryota
- Kingdom: Animalia
- Phylum: Nematoda
- Class: Secernentea
- Order: Tylenchida
- Family: Anguinidae
- Genus: Anguina
- Species: A. funesta

Binomial name
- Anguina funesta Price, J.M. Fisher & Kerr, 1979

= Anguina funesta =

Species of roundworm

Anguina funesta is a plant pathogenic nematode.
