= Neumark =

Region in the Margraviate of Brandenburg

Coordinates: 50°39′26″N 12°21′19″E

Neumark or East Brandenburg Neumark or Ostbrandenburg (German) Nowa Marchia (Polish) Terra trans Oderam (Latin)
- Region of the Margraviate of Brandenburg
- 1252–1945
- Coat of arms of Brandenburg, shared by the Neumark

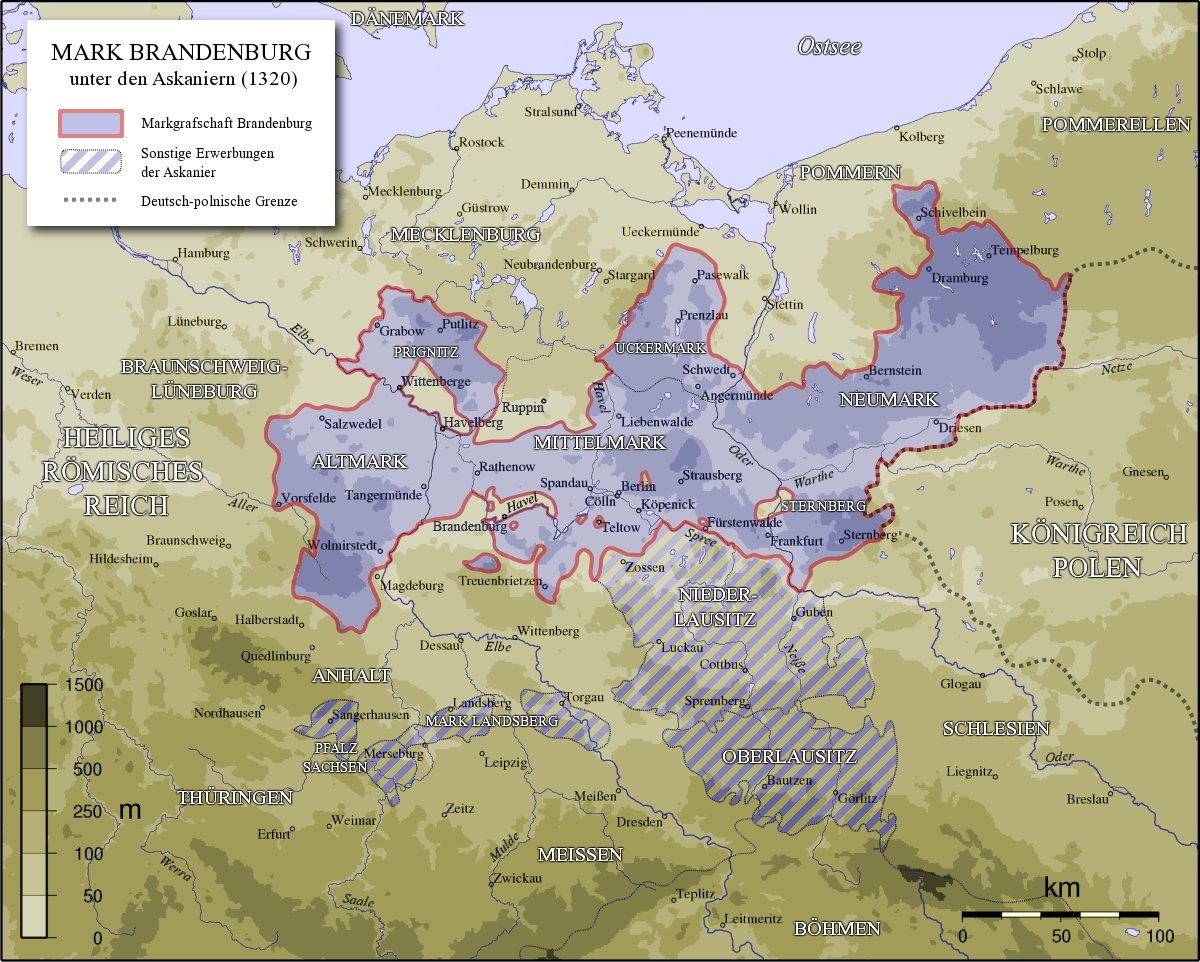
- The Margraviate of Brandenburg c. 1320, showing the Neumark as the portion reaching out to the east. Cross-hatched are territories also acquired by the House of Ascania outside of Brandenburg.
- Capital: Soldin
- Historical era: Middle Ages; Modern era
  - Lubusz Land bought by Mgvt Brandenburg and Abp Magdeburg: 1252
  - Pawned to the Teutonic Knights: 1402–1463^{a}
  - Partitioned to form Brandenburg-Küstrin: 1535–1571
  - Electors inherited Duchy of Prussia: 1618
  - Expanded on abolition of Posen-West Prussia: 1938
  - Potsdam Agreement awarded most of Neumark to Poland: 1 August 1945
  - Reorganised to Lubusz Voivodeship: 1 January 1999
Preceded by
Lubusz Land
Succeeded by
Lubusz Voivodeship
West Pomeranian Voivodeship
Brandenburg
- Today part of: Poland; Germany
- a: Pawned to the Teutonic Knights in 1402, who gained complete control of the territory by 1429. Pawned back to Brandenburg in 1455, whose reacquisition of the territory was completed in 1463.

The Neumark (German pronunciation: [ˈnɔʏmaʁk]), also known as the New March (Polish: Nowa Marchia) or as East Brandenburg (German: Ostbrandenburg [ˈɔstˌbʁandn̩bʊʁk]), was a region of the Margraviate of Brandenburg and its successors located east of the Oder River.

Called the Lubusz Land while part of medieval Poland, the territory later known as the Neumark gradually became part of the German Margraviate of Brandenburg from the mid-13th century. As Brandenburg-Küstrin the Neumark formed an independent state of the Holy Roman Empire from 1535 to 1571; after the death of the margrave John, a younger son of Joachim I Nestor, Elector of Brandenburg, it returned to Elector John George, the margrave's nephew and Joachim I Nestor's grandson. With the rest of the Electorate of Brandenburg, it became part of the Kingdom of Prussia in 1701 and part of the German Empire in 1871 when each of those states first formed. After World War I the entirely ethnic German Neumark remained within the Free State of Prussia, itself part of the Weimar Republic (Germany).

After World War II the Potsdam Conference assigned the majority of the Neumark to Polish administration, and since 1945 has remained part of Poland. Polish settlers largely replaced the expelled German population. Most of the Polish territory became part of the Lubusz Voivodeship, while the northern towns Choszczno (Arnswalde), Myślibórz (Soldin), and Chojna (Königsberg in der Neumark) belong to the West Pomeranian Voivodeship. Some territory near Cottbus, which was administratively part of the Government Region of Frankfurt (coterminous with the Neumark) after the 1815 Congress of Vienna, became part of East Germany in the 1940s, becoming part of Germany after reunification in 1990.

== Location ==
The Oder marked the borders of the Neumark in the west and south; in the north it bordered Pomerania, and in the east Greater Poland until the Partitions of Poland in the late 18th century. From the 1772 First Partition of Poland it bordered the Prussian Netze District in the east, which had largely been carved out of the northern part of Greater Poland. After the 1793 Second Partition of Poland the remainder of Greater Poland became part of the Province of South Prussia. In 1807 South Prussia and the southern part of the Netze District (among other areas) became part of the Napoleonic Duchy of Warsaw, while the northern part of the Netze District was merged into the Province of West Prussia; the Neumark shared borders with both.

After 1815 (Congress of Vienna) the Neumark was dissolved, largely becoming part of Regierungsbezirk Frankfurt of the Province of Brandenburg. Most of the eastern border of the Neumark became that of Brandenburg/Frankfurt with West Prussia (Province of Prussia 1829–1878) and the Grand Duchy of Posen (Province of Posen from 1848).

The Warta and Noteć Rivers and their swamp regions dominated the landscape of the region. At the time of the Neumark's greatest territorial extent (at the end of the 17th century), the region included the following later Kreise (districts) and towns:

=== In the Brandenburgian Region of Frankfurt ===
- Arnswalde (1818–1945; from 1938 part of Pomeranian Region of Posen-West Prussia), based in Neuwedell (till 1908), thereafter in Arnswalde
- Crossen (Oder) (1818–1945), based in Crossen upon Oder
- Friedeberg (1816–1945; from 1938 part of Pomeranian Region of Posen-West Prussia), based in Friedeberg in the New March
- Königsberg (New March) (1816–15 March 1946, remainder west of the Oder merged into Angermünde, Lebus and Oberbarnim districts), based in Königsberg in the New March
- Landsberg (Warthe) (1818–1945), based in Landsberg upon Warthe
- Soldin (1818–1945), based in Soldin
- Sternberg, (1816–1873; partitioned into Oststernberg and Weststernberg), based in Zielenzig (till 1852), thereafter in Drossen

=== In the Pomeranian Region of Köslin ===
- Dramburg (1816–1945; from 1938 part of Pomeranian Region of Posen-West Prussia), based in Dramburg
- Schivelbein (1816–1945), based in Schivelbein

== History ==
=== Ancient history ===
In the Bronze Age the area which became the Neumark fell within the area of the Lusatian culture. In the Iron Age the Jastorf culture operated in this region, identified sometimes with Germanic and sometimes with Celtic tribes.

As its inhabitants moved westward, the region became depopulated during the Migration Period. After AD 500 West Slavic tribes gradually repopulated the area, which became a forest borderland between Pomerania and Greater Poland. According to the Bavarian Geographer's description, the Miloxi inhabited the future Neumark region: they had 47 settlements between the Oder and Poznań.

=== Middle Ages ===
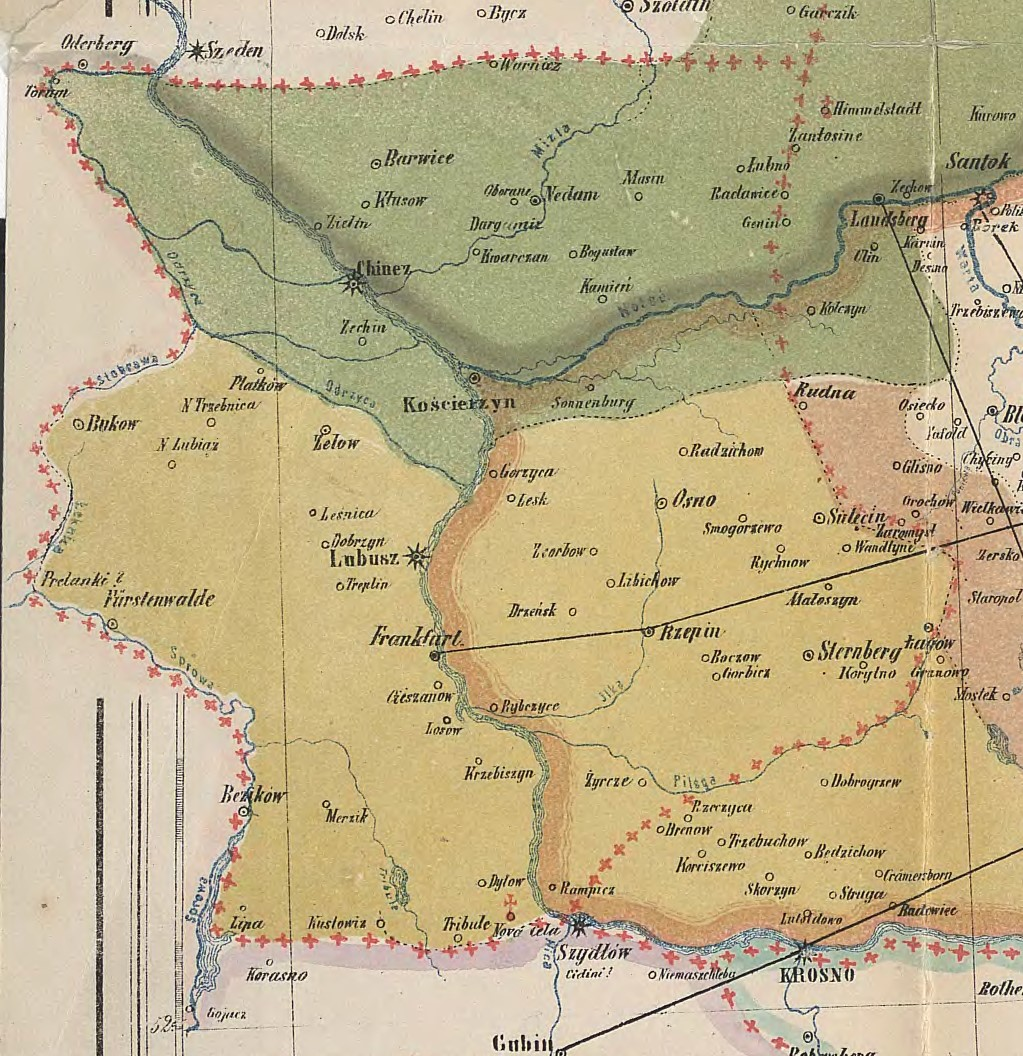
Lubusz Land – core of the future Neumark – during the Piast period (marked in yellow)

The region came under the sovereignty of the first Polish state during the 10th-century rule of Mieszko I (died 992) and Bolesław I (ruled 992–1025), Dukes of the Polans. Polish rulers incorporated the future Neumark territory as the Lubusz Land and by the beginning of the 13th century the previously depopulated region had a thinly-spread population of Poles.

Beginning in the 1230s, Low-German–speaking colonists from the Holy Roman Empire began settling north and south of the Warta and Noteć Rivers upon the initiative of Pomeranian and Polish lords (see Ostsiedlung). The lords invited members of the Knights Templar and Knights Hospitaller to establish monasteries, near which settlements began to develop. To fortify the borderland Pomeranian and Polish dukes built castles in the north, around which settlements also grew.

The Ascanian margraves of Brandenburg, starting with Albert the Bear (ruled 1157–1170), aspired to extend their dominion east of the Oder. They had gained a foothold east of the river by 1242 and in 1252 the Margraviate of Brandenburg and the Archbishopric of Magdeburg purchased the Lubusz Land. In 1253 they founded Frankfurt an der Oder as a river-crossing and as a staging-point for further expansion eastward. Through land purchases, marriage pacts, and services to Poland's Piast dynasty, the Ascanians extended their territory eastward to the Drawa River and northward to the Parsęta River. For instance, the Polish castellany of Santok, an important base and crossing point over the Warta near its junction with the Noteć, was sought by Pomerania. To relieve himself of the trouble of maintaining the fortress, Duke Przemysł I of Greater Poland granted the castellany to Margrave Conrad as a dowry for his daughter Konstancja. To safeguard the region Margrave John I founded the town of Landsberg an der Warthe (now Gorzów Wielkopolski) in 1257. The Templars sold Soldin to the Ascanians in 1261, and the town began to become a center for the region.

Most of the colonists who settled in Brandenburg's new eastern territory came from Magdeburg or the Altmark ("Old March"). Unlike in the rest of Brandenburg (where the Ascanians settled knights in open villages) the margraves began constructing castles in their land east of the Oder to guard against Poland. The Slavic inhabitants of the region gradually became Germanized. Because the new Terra trans Oderam, or "land across the Oder", formed an extension of the Margraviate of Brandenburg, it became known as the Neumark ("New March") after the middle of the 15th century.

With the extinction of the Ascanian line in 1320, Brandenburg's interest in the Neumark decreased. Neither the margraves of the Wittelsbach (1323–1373) nor those of the Luxembourg dynasties concerned themselves with developing their easternmost territory further. The political vacuum allowed Poland to reassert its influence in the area, while robber barons terrorized the populace.

=== Teutonic Knights ===
Brandenburg pawned the Neumark to the Teutonic Knights in 1402, and it passed completely under their control in 1429, although the Order neglected the region as well. After the Teutonic Knights' defeat in the Battle of Grunwald (Tannenberg) in 1410, the future Grand Master Michael Küchmeister von Sternberg used the Neumark as a staging ground for an army of German and Hungarian mercenaries which he later used against the forces of King Władysław II Jagiełło of Poland. This allowed the Order to retain much of its territory in the First Peace of Thorn in 1411.

In 1454/1455 the Knights' mismanagement led to their pawning of the Neumark back to Brandenburg, by then led by Elector Frederick II of the Hohenzollern dynasty (Treaties of Cölln and Mewe). After Frederick completed the re-acquisition of Neumark in 1463 for 40,000 guilders, the region belonged to Brandenburg for the following centuries, with the exception of the time between 1535 and 1571. Frederick II wrote for his successors "that the said land, the New Mark, shall belong to German territory and to the worshipful Electorate of the Mark of Brandenburg, with which it was incorporated at the institution of the Electorate, and shall so remain, and shall never pass to those who speak not the German tongue".

=== Brandenburg-Küstrin ===
Margraviate of Brandenburg-Küstrin Markgrafschaft Brandenburg-Küstrin (German)
- 1535–1571
- Flag of Brandenburg Coat of arms of Brandenburg

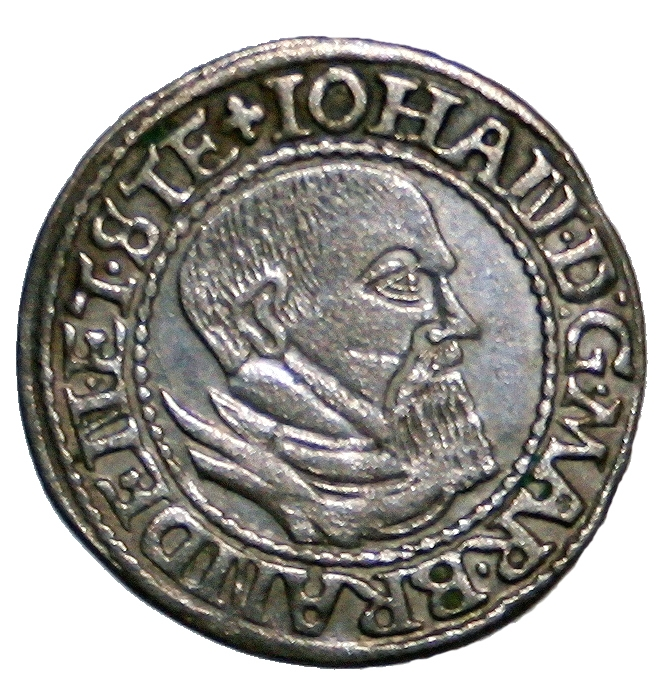
- A groschen of John, Margrave of Brandenburg-Küstrin, 1545
- Status: Margraviate
- Capital: Soldin (to 1548)^{a}; Küstrin (from 1548)^{b}
- Government: Principality
- Margrave
- Historical era: Early modern age
  - Partitioned from Brandenburg: 1535
  - Reabsorbed into Brandenburg: 1571
Preceded by	Succeeded by
Margraviate of Brandenburg	Margraviate of Brandenburg
- Today part of: Poland Germany
- 1. Soldin is now the Polish city of Myślibórz.; 2. Küstrin straddled the Oder-Neisse line, so was partitioned after World War II and is now Kostrzyn nad Odrą in Poland and the Küstriner Vorland in Germany.

After the death of Elector Joachim I Nestor in 1535, Brandenburg's territory west of the Oder (the Kurmark) went to his older son Joachim II Hector, while the Neumark went to his younger son John, who began ruling the Neumark as an independent margraviate and consolidated the land. An enthusiastic supporter of the Protestant Reformation, John succeeded in converting the Neumark to Lutheranism and in confiscating church property. He lived frugally and acquired wealth for his treasury through usury and hiring out mercenary companies.

The division of Brandenburg resulted in trade wars between the brothers, as Crossen and Landsberg competed with the Kurmark's Frankfurt for mercantile primacy. The two margraves eventually compromised – at the economic expense of Stettin. (The brothers also reconciled out of concern for their territories during the Schmalkaldic War of 1546–47.)

In 1548 John's administration moved from Soldin to Küstrin. With the death of both brothers within ten days of each other in 1571, the Neumark became reunited with the Kurmark under Joachim II's son, John George.

=== Brandenburg-Prussia ===
In 1618, East Brandenburg became part of Brandenburg-Prussia after the electors' inheritance of the Duchy of Prussia. During the Thirty Years' War (1618–1648) both Swedish and Imperial troops plundered, ravaged and burnt the land, while plague epidemics in 1626 and 1631 killed much of the populace. While occupied by Swedish troops the region had to contribute 60,000 thalers and 10,000 Wispel of rye.

=== Kingdom of Prussia ===
Map of the Neumark (c. 1720)

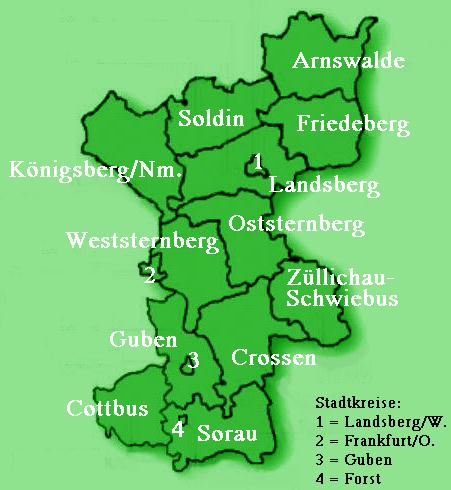
Districts in the Neumark as of 1873

After the declaration of the Kingdom of Prussia in 1701, the situation in the Neumark began to improve. King Frederick I initiated new waves of colonization. Many French Huguenots, forced to flee from religious persecution in France, arrived as settlers. The textile industry also began to develop in the Neumark. The Seven Years' War caused the region to regress in its development, as high contributions were exacted from the population for the war effort and the Neumark was the setting for battles such as at Kunersdorf. Under Frederick II, increased land reclamation and economic consolidation resulted from the drainage of the Warta and Notec areas.

The reorganization of Prussia after the territorial changes – resulting from the Congress of Vienna in 1815 – changed the political makeup of the Neumark. The districts of Dramburg and Schivelbein and the northern part of the Arnswalde district with the town of Nörenberg became part of the Province of Pomerania. The Neumark's remaining territory was incorporated into the newly created Frankfurt Region of the Province of Brandenburg.

=== Germany ===
With the formation of the Prussian-led German Empire in 1871 the Neumark — along with the rest of Brandenburg — became part of a unified German state. In the Weimar Republic's National Assembly of 1 November 1919, the majority of the region voted for the Social Democratic Party of Germany (SPD). The Neumark populace mostly voted for the German National People's Party in the elections for the German Reichstag on 20 May 1928, with a small island of SPD voters. In the Reichstag vote of December 1924 1,900 votes were cast for the Polish People's Party out of a population of 570,000. In 1925 the Neumark had 3,500 Polish speakers. In the Reichstag vote of 6 November 1932, the Nazi Party won the election in the region.

When the Nazi authorities dissolved the province of Posen-West Prussia in 1938, they expanded the Frankfurt Region to include the districts of Schwerin and of Meseritz, although the New Marcher districts of Arnswalde and of Friedeberg were reassigned to Pomerania. According to the 1939 census, the Neumark had a population of 645,000 residents, including 3,000 non-Germans. The dialect spoken in much of the territory was the East Low German Brandenburgisch dialect.

==== Infrastructure before 1945 ====
The Neumark region long featured agriculture and forestry. The medium-sized towns were mostly Ackerbürgerstädte, or farmer-citizen-towns. The textile industry became prominent in the 19th century. With the construction of modern roadways, of the Fernverkehrstraße 1 (an arterial road from Berlin to Königsberg), and of the Prussian Eastern Railway, the Neumark also began to develop industrially. Such development was primarily geared toward agricultural needs and was concentrated near the cities of Landsberg and Küstrin, and the Neumark did not become nearly as industrialized or densely populated as other German areas such as the Ruhr, Saxony, or Upper Silesia.

==== World War II ====
Near the end of World War II, the Soviet Red Army reached the Neumark at the end of January 1945. Because the Red Army had advanced so quickly, the civilian population of the region suffered greatly from warfare and occupying troops because they had not prepared to flee in time. More than 40,000 New Marchers were killed in action as soldiers.

Under the terms demanded by the Soviet Union in the Potsdam Agreement, the region was put under Polish administration after the Potsdam Conference and eventually became part of Poland. Germans remaining in the region were expelled. Poles, some of whom had themselves been expelled from the Polish areas annexed by the Soviet Union settled the region. A small part of the German population, mostly technicians for the water supply companies, were retained and used for compulsory labour; they were allowed to emigrate to Germany in the 1950s. Older estimates indicated that of the pre-war population of 645,000, only 5,000 of the inhabitants from 1939 remained in the province in 1950.

==== Villages in today's Germany west of the Oder ====
After the regulation of the river Oder in the 18th century the western border of the New March was not adapted to the Oder's new partially more eastern course. Thus the New Marcher villages west of the Oder, now the German-Polish border, remained with post-World War II Germany.

Formerly located within the District of Königsberg in the New March were the villages Adlig Reetz, Alt and Neu Bleyen, Altglietzen, Altreetz, Altwustrow, Bralitz, Croustillier, Drewitz Ausbau (a locality of Bleyen), Gabow, Güstebieser Loose, Hohenwutzen, Karlsbiese, Karlshof, Königlich Reetz (a locality of Oderaue), Küstrin-Kietz, Neuenhagen in the New March, Neuküstrinchen (a locality of Oderaue), Neulietzegöricke, Neuranft, Neurüdnitz, Neutornow, Neuwustrow, Schaumburg in the Oderbruch (a locality of Bleyen), Schiffmühle, Zäckericker Loose and Zelliner Loose (a locality of Letschin). The villages of Aurith and Kunitz-Loose (a locality of Wiesenau) formed part of the Weststernberg district.

=== Poland ===
The Oder-Neisse line delimiting Germany and Poland split several localities of the region into divided cities:

- Küstrin was separated into German Küstrin-Kietz and Polish Kostrzyn nad Odrą,
- Frankfurt an der Oder was split into German Frankfurt (Oder) and Polish Słubice,
- Guben was divided into German Guben and Polish Gubin,
- Bad Muskau was split into German Bad Muskau and Polish Łęknica,
- Forst was divided into German Forst and Polish Zasieki,
- Görlitz was separated into German Görlitz and Polish Zgorzelec.

To replace the expelled indigenous German population, Soviet authorities re-settled Neumark with Poles and Ukrainians from territories of Poland annexed by the Soviet Union. From 1975 to 1998 the former Neumark territory was divided between the Voivodeships of Gorzów and Zielona Góra with a small section around Chojna in Szczecin Voivodeship. Since the reorganization of Polish voivodeships on 1 January 1999, almost all of the former Neumark region lies within the Lubusz Voivodeship.

==== Modern inhabitants ====
During the Polish post-war census of December 1950, data about the pre-war places of residence of the inhabitants as of August 1939 was collected. In case of children born between September 1939 and December 1950, their origin was reported based on the pre-war places of residence of their mothers. Thanks to this data it is possible to reconstruct the pre-war geographical origin of the post-war population. The same area corresponding to 1939 East Brandenburg east of the Oder-Neisse line (which became part of Poland in 1945) was inhabited as of December 1950 by:

1950 population by place of residence back in 1939:
Region (within 1939 borders):	Number	Percent
Autochthons (1939 DE/FCD citizens)	14,809	3,3%
Polish expellees from Kresy (USSR)	187,298	42,1%
Poles from abroad except the USSR	10,943	2,5%
Resettlers from the City of Warsaw	8,600	1,9%
From Warsaw region (Masovia)	16,926	3,8%
From Białystok region and Sudovia	3,772	0,8%
From pre-war Polish Pomerania	19,191	4,3%
Resettlers from Poznań region	88,427	19,9%
Katowice region (East Upper Silesia)	4,725	1,1%
Resettlers from the City of Łódź	2,377	0,5%
Resettlers from Łódź region	22,954	5,2%
Resettlers from Kielce region	14,203	3,2%
Resettlers from Lublin region	19,250	4,3%
Resettlers from Kraków region	12,587	2,8%
Resettlers from Rzeszów region	13,147	3,0%
place of residence in 1939 unknown	5,720	1,3%
Total pop. in December 1950	444,929	100,0%

Over 95% of the 1950 population were newcomers to the region, with less than 5% residing in German East Brandenburg already back in August 1939 (so called autochthons, who had German citizenship before World War II and were granted Polish citizenship after 1945). The largest group among new inhabitants were Poles expelled from areas of Eastern Poland annexed by the Soviet Union. The second largest group were people from neighbouring pre-war Poznań Voivodeship of Poland (historical Greater Poland region), comprising one-fifth of post-war inhabitants.

== See also ==
- Bishopric of Lebus
- List of cities and towns in the Neumark
