= List of cities and towns in the Neumark =

The following is a list of cities and towns in the Neumark, Germany, as used until 1945.

City/Town	District (Kreis)	Pop. in 1939	Polish name
Arnswalde	Arnswalde	11,738	Choszczno
Bärwalde	Königsberg/Nm.	3,580	Mieszkowice
Berlinchen	Soldin	7,621	Barlinek
Bernstein	Arnswalde/Soldin	2,728	Pełczyce
Bobersberg	Crossen	1,122	Bobrowice
Crossen	Crossen	7,526	Krosno Odrzańskie
Dramburg	Dramburg	7,301	Drawsko Pomorskie
Driesen	Friedeberg	5,887	Drezdenko
Drossen	Weststernberg	5,310	Ośno Lubuskie
Falkenburg	Dramburg	6,002	Złocieniec
Friedeberg	Friedeberg	6,134	Strzelce Krajeńskie
Fürstenfelde	Königsberg/Nm.	1,636	Boleszkowice
Kallies	Dramburg	4,019	Kalisz Pomorski
Königsberg/Nm.	Königsberg/Nm.	6,288	Chojna
Königswalde	Oststernberg	1,431	Lubniewice
Küstrin	Königsberg/Nm.	23,771	Kostrzyn nad Odrą
Landsberg/W.	Stadtkreis	45,928	Gorzów Wielkopolski
Lippehne	Soldin	4,531	Lipiany
Mohrin	Königsberg/Nm.	1,286	Moryń
Neudamm	Königsberg/Nm.	7,488	Dębno
Neuwedell	Arnswalde	2,745	Drawno
Nörenberg	Arnswalde/Saatzig	3,040	Ińsko
Reetz	Arnswalde	3,595	Recz
Reppen	Weststernberg	6,429	Rzepin
Rothenburg/Oder	Crossen/Grünberg	1,431	Czerwieńsk
Schifelbein	Belgard	9,420	Świdwin
Schönfließ	Königsberg/Nm.	2,843	Trzcińsko-Zdrój
Soldin	Soldin	6,284	Myślibórz
Sommerfeld	Crossen	10,928	Lubsko
Sonnenburg	Oststernberg	3,400	Słońsk
Sternberg	Oststernberg	1,936	Torzym
Woldenberg	Friedeberg	5,103	Dobiegniew
Zehden	Königsberg/Nm.	1,769	Cedynia
Zielenzig	Oststernberg	5,867	Sulęcin
Züllichau	Züllichau-Schwiebus	9,630	Sulechów

This article is a translation of the German Wikipedia's Liste der Städte in der Neumark article.

== See also ==
- List of placenames in the Province of Pomerania
- List of German exonyms for places in Poland
