= Torzym =

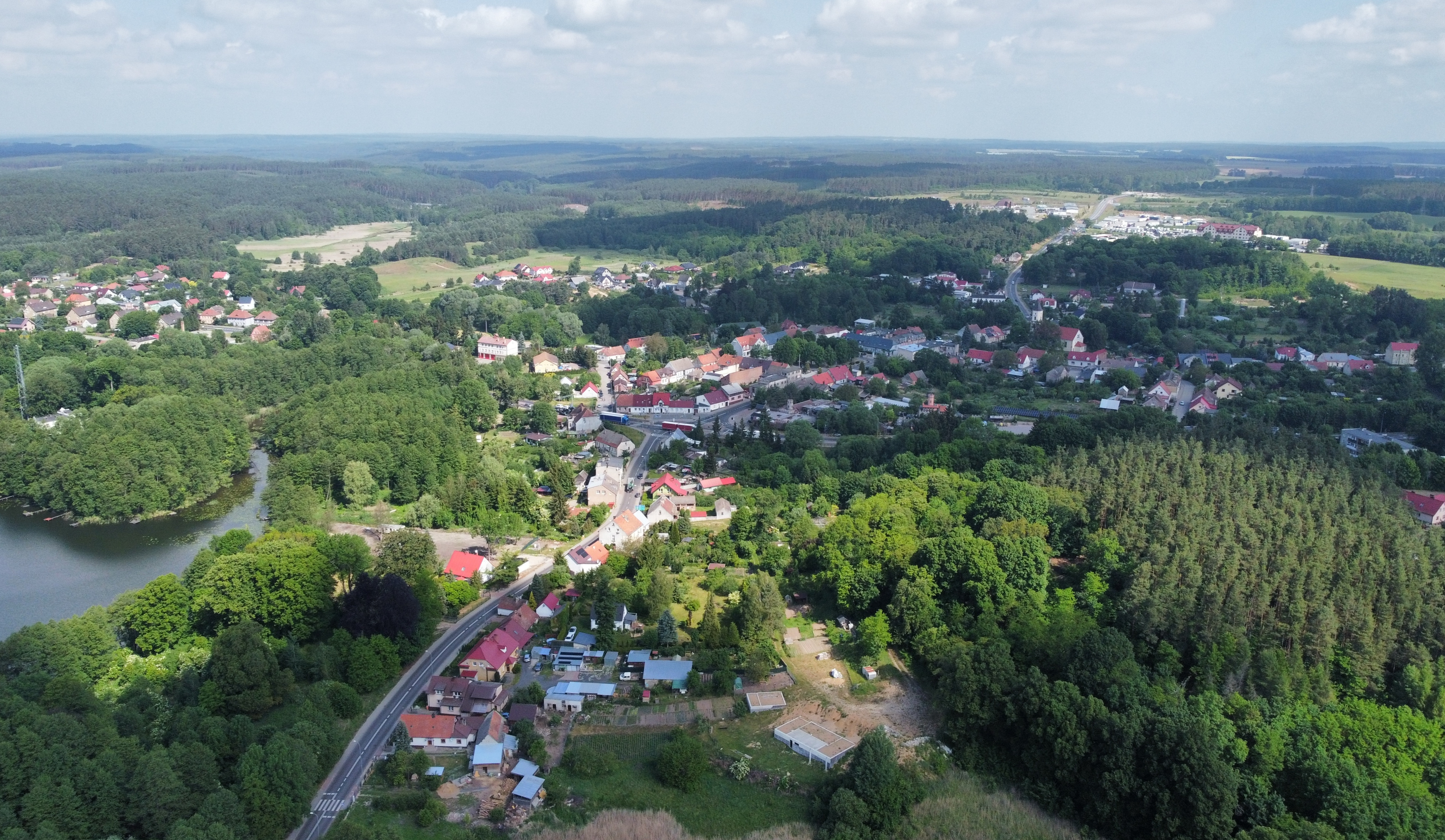
- Aerial view of Torzym

- Flag Coat of arms

- Location within Poland
- Coordinates: 52°18′46″N 15°4′40″E
- Country: Poland
- Voivodeship: Lubusz
- County: Sulęcin
- Gmina: Torzym
- Town rights: 1375

Area
  - Total: 9.11 km^{2} (3.52 sq mi)

Population (2019-06-30)
  - Total: 2,526
  - Density: 277/km^{2} (718/sq mi)
- Time zone: UTC+1 (CET)
  - Summer (DST): UTC+2 (CEST)
- Postal code: 66-235
- Vehicle registration: FSU
- Website: www.torzym.pl

Torzym [ˈtɔʐɨm] (German: Sternberg in der Neumark) is a small town in Sulęcin County, Lubusz Voivodeship, in western Poland. It is the administrative seat of the urban-rural Gmina Torzym.

== Geography ==
Torzym is situated on the Ilanka creek, a right tributary of the Oder, in the historic Lubusz Land. The town centre is located about 36 km (22 mi) east of the border with Germany at Słubice. Torzym station is a stop on the Warsaw–Kunowice railway line. The town also has access to the parallel A2 autostrada, part of the major European route E30, at the Torzym junction.

== History ==
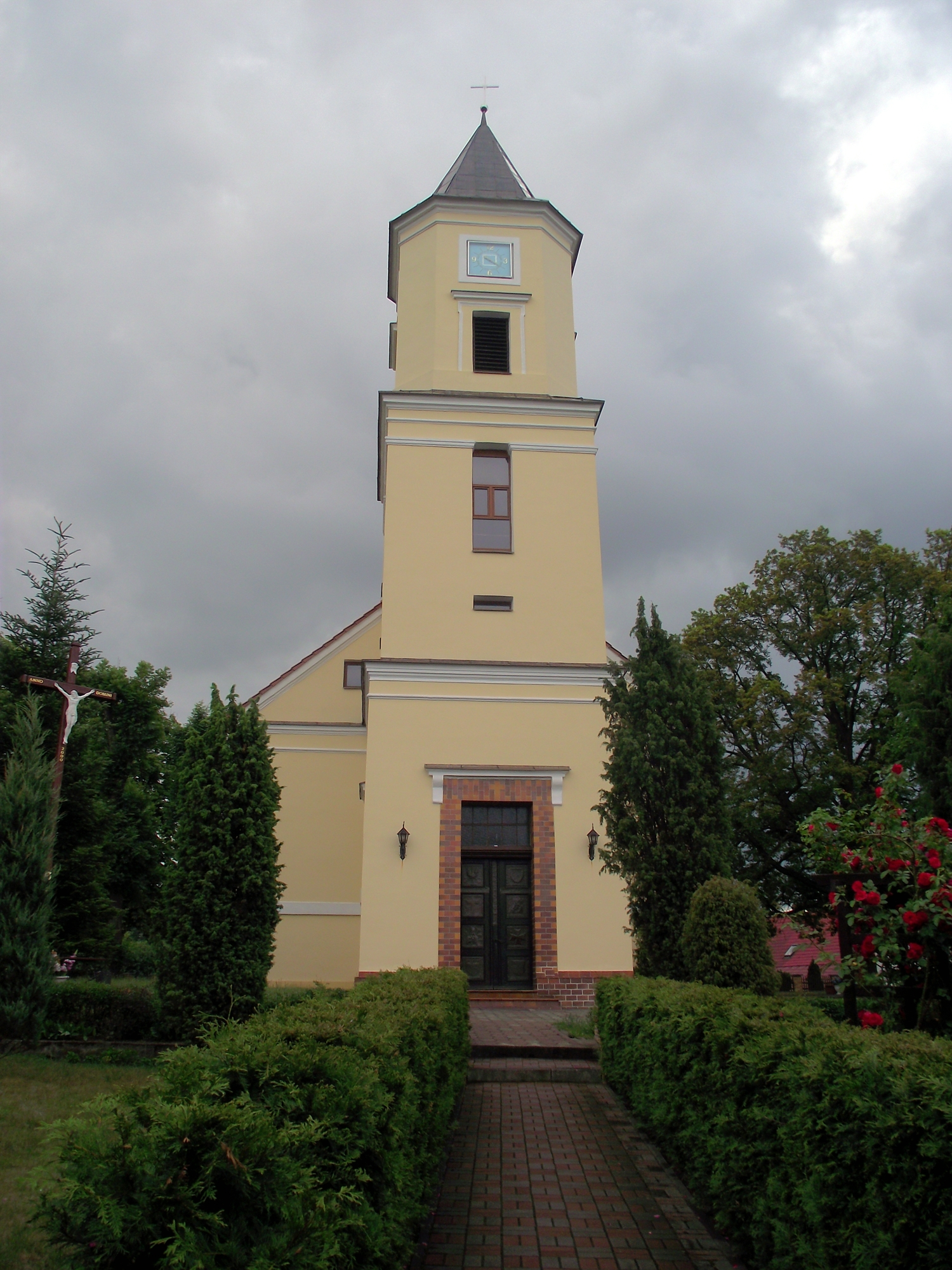
Exaltation of the Holy Cross

The region of Lubusz Land formed part of Poland since the creation of the state in the 10th century. The settlement arose sometime after 1249, when Lubusz Land was sold by the High Duke of Poland Bolesław II Rogatka to the Archbishops of Magdeburg. Located on the trade route from Frankfurt (Oder) to Poznań in Greater Poland, a fortress at the site was probably named after Konrad von Sternberg, Prince-Archbishop of Magdeburg from 1266 until 1277. In 1287, the Magdeburg archbishop Eric of Brandenburg gave the estates in pawn to his elder brothers, the Ascanian margraves of Brandenburg. Under Brandenburg rule, the whole area east of the Oder river from about 1300 was called "Sternberg Land" (Sternberger Land).

After a war broke out over control of the region in 1319, the town came under Polish control again, as part of the Duchy of Głogów, but by 1326 it fell to Brandenburg again.

Between 1373 and 1415 the town was part of the Lands of the Bohemian (Czech) Crown. In 1375 it was granted town privileges. Several manors arose in the surrounding area, held by local nobles; the citizens mainly relied on cattle trade, brewing, and distilleries. The castle probably was slighted during a 1506 expedition of the Hohenzollern elector Joachim I Nestor of Brandenburg against several robber barons devastating his country.

After the Napoleonic Wars, Sternberg Land was incorporated into the Prussian Province of Brandenburg and recalled in an 1816-founded Landkreis with its administrative seat in Zielenzig (Sulęcin), and from 1852 in Drossen (Ośno Lubuskie). Part of the larger Regierungsbezirk Frankfurt, in 1873 the district was divided in two, Weststernberg (Drossen) and Oststernberg (Zielenzig) with Sternberg proper. The Protestant parish church was rebuilt between 1831 and 1834 in a Neoclassical style according to plans designed by Karl Friedrich Schinkel. From 1871 to 1945 the town was part of Germany. During World War II, from 1940 to 1942, Nazi Germany operated a forced labour camp for Jewish men in the town. During the final stages of the war, in early 1945, a German-perpetrated death march of prisoners of various nationalities from the dissolved camp in Żabikowo to the Sachsenhausen concentration camp passed through the town.

The town was heavily damaged during the Vistula–Oder Offensive of the Red Army in the last weeks of World War II. After Nazi Germany's defeat in the war, Torzym became part of Poland after the Polish-German border was moved to the Oder-Neisse line in 1945. It was known as Toruń Lubuski between 1945 and 1946.

Torzym regained the status of a town in 1994.

== Demographics ==
Historical population

Year	Pop.	±%
1843	1,423	—
1871	1,594	+12.0%
1880	1,567	−1.7%
1890	1,564	−0.2%
1900	1,636	+4.6%

Year	Pop.	±%
1910	1,677	+2.5%
1925	2,112	+25.9%
1939	2,158	+2.2%
2010	2,462	+14.1%

== Twin towns – sister cities ==
See twin towns of Gmina Torzym.
