= Charlotte Zinke =

German politician

Member of the Reichstag of the Weimar Republic
- In office 1930–1933

Personal details
- Born: Charlotte Emilie Ernestine Maetschke; 23 June 1891 Zielenzig, Province of Brandenburg, Prussia, German Empire
- Died: 6 November 1944 (aged 53) Ravensbrück concentration camp
- Party: Communist Party of Germany
- Other political affiliations: Social Democratic Party

Charlotte Zinke (23 June 1891 – 6 November 1944, née Maetschke) was a German politician of the Communist Party (KPD) and a representative in the Reichstag.

== Life ==
The young Charlotte Emilie Ernestine Maetschke was born and raised in Zielenzig (now Sulęcin, Poland), in the vicinity of Frankfurt an der Oder. While young she travelled to the Ruhr area in search of work and a future. She arrived in Mülheim, where she learned bricklaying and later met Communist Party functionary Willy Zinke. They were married on 17 December 1910.

Active initially in the Social Democratic Party, Zinke joined the Communist Party in Essen-Frohnhausen in 1920, and from 1927 to 1930 held the office of district women's chief (Bezirksfrauenleiterin) for the Communist Party for the Ruhr area. In 1928 she was elected to the Landtag of Prussia, in 1929 to the Essen City Parliament, and finally in 1930 to the German Reichstag, to which she belonged until 1933.

Following the Nazi seizure of power, Zinke went into hiding in Essen and in the Waldeck countryside before emigrating to the Netherlands in the spring of 1933. In January 1934, she returned with her husband to Essen, where she was questioned by police. In 1934, she was expelled from the Communist Party because she was unwilling to participate in illegal actions. After the assassination attempt on Hitler in July 1944, she was arrested on 26 August 1944 by the Gestapo as part of the mass arrest "Aktion Gitter" and was taken into "protective custody" in Essen. At the end of September 1944, she was transferred to the Ravensbrück concentration camp. While in transit there, Zinke was able to smuggle out a last note to her husband. Almost unreadable, it says: "Hopefully I have the strength to endure it all." („Hoffentlich habe ich die Kraft, das alles auszuhalten.“) Zinke was murdered on 6 November 1944.

== Memorials ==
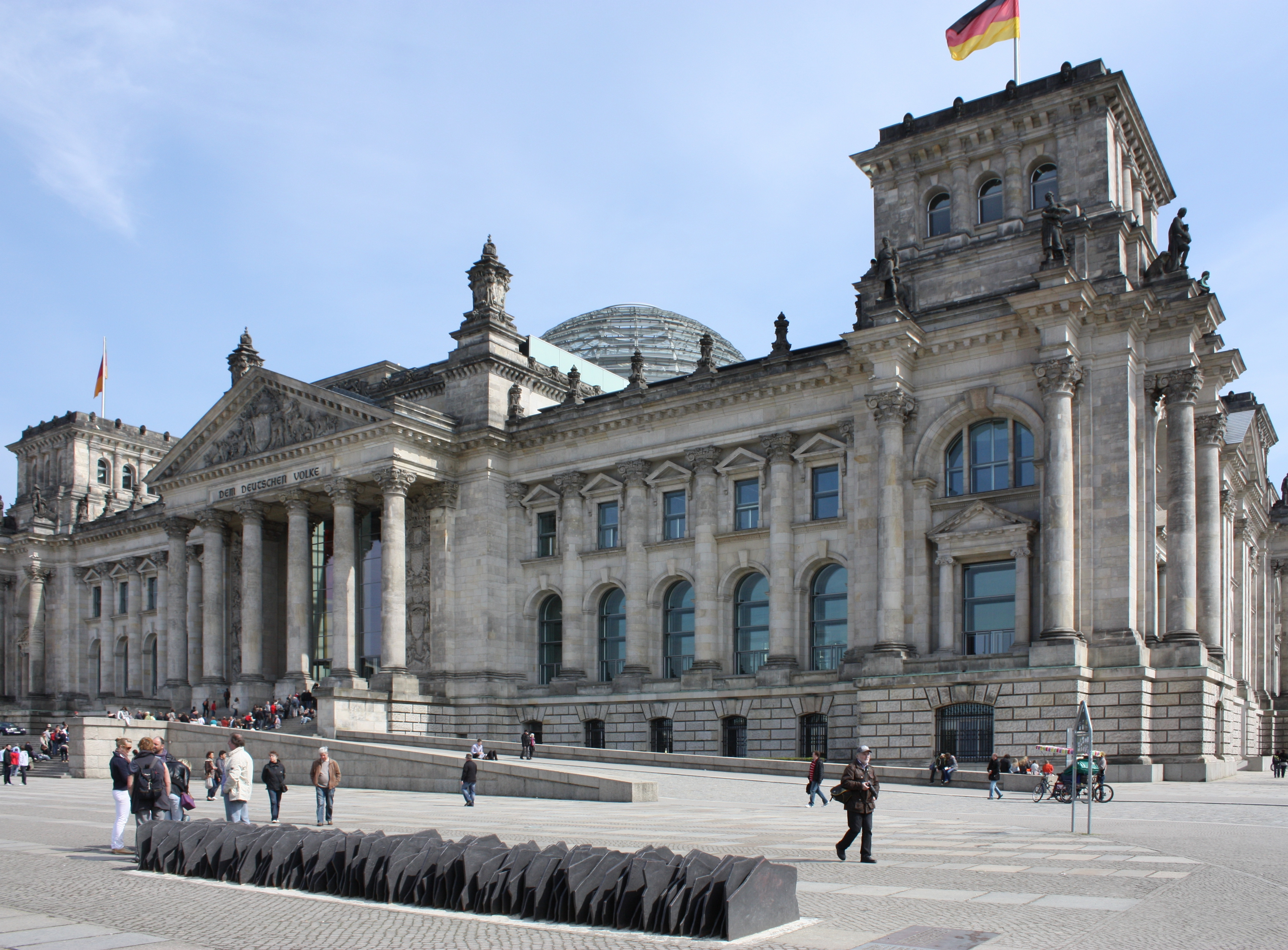
Memorial plaque at the Reichstag

In Berlin, since 1992 Zinke's name appears on one of the 96 plaques in the Memorial to the Murdered Members of the Reichstag, on the corner of Scheidemannstraße / Republic Square in Berlin near the Reichstag building. In 2006, in front of her former residence in Essen-Haarzopf (Fängerhofstraße 35), a Stolperstein for Charlotte Zinke was installed.

== Literature ==
- Hermann Weber, Andreas Herbst: Deutsche Kommunisten. Biographisches Handbuch 1918 bis 1945. Karl Dietz Verlag, Berlin 2004, ISBN 3-320-02044-7, pp. 898
