= Regierungsbezirk Frankfurt =

Frankfurt Regierungsbezirk Frankfurt
- Regierungsbezirk
- Map of Brandenburg highlighting the former Regierungsbezirk of Frankfurt (in red)
- Country: Prussia/German Empire
- Province/State: Brandenburg/Prussia
- Established: 1815
- Disestablished: 1945
- Region seat: Frankfurt (Oder)

Area
  - Total: 20,731 km^{2} (8,004 sq mi)

Population (1939)
  - Total: 1,316,590
  - Density: 63.508/km^{2} (164.49/sq mi)

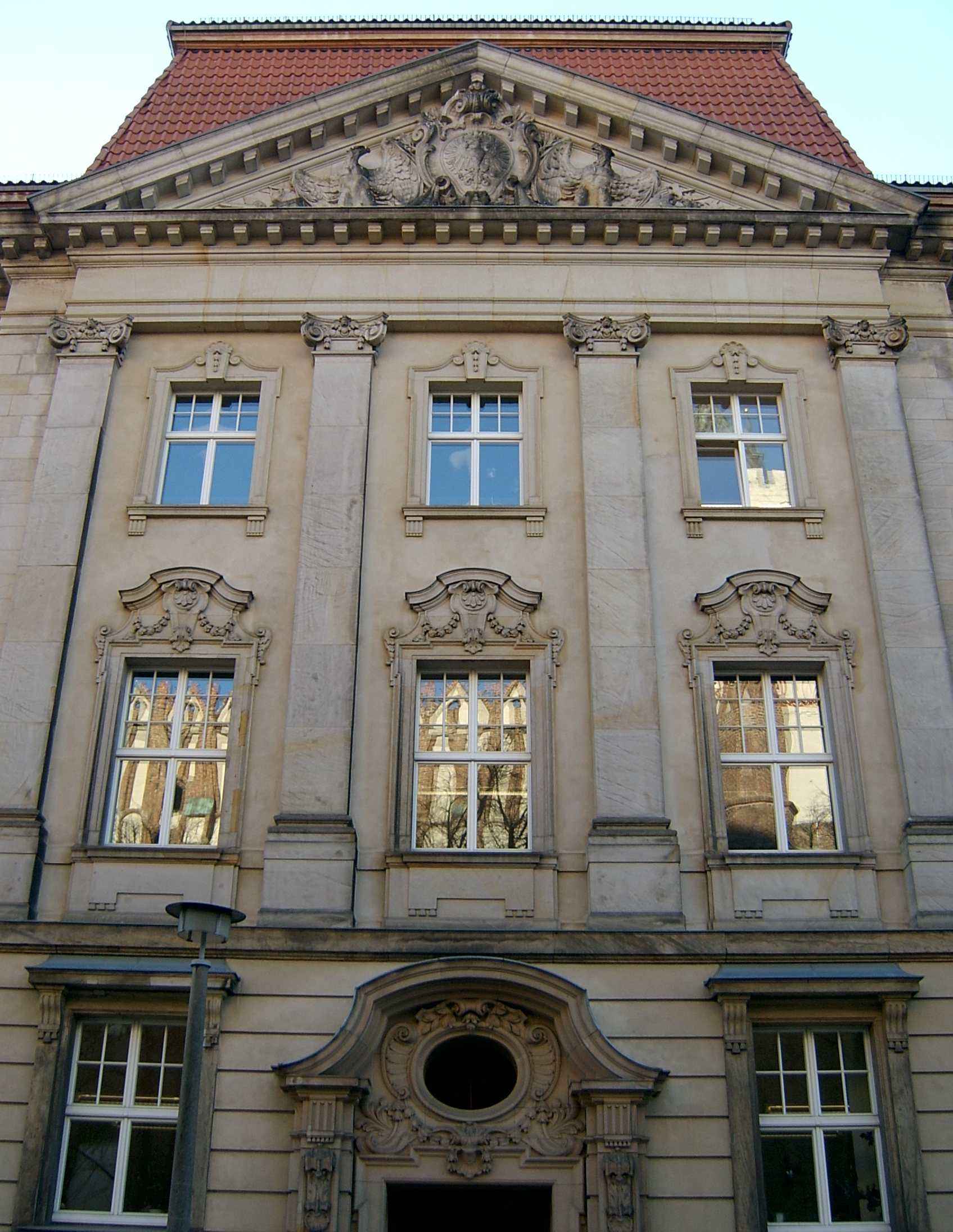
Frankfurt former regional Government House, now Viadrina University, main building.

The Frankfurt Region was a government region in the Prussian Province of Brandenburg between 1815 and 1945. Its administrative capital was Frankfurt (Oder). Today its western part is in the State of Brandenburg while the eastern part, following frontier changes agreed by the Soviet Union in 1945, is part of Poland, roughly corresponding to the Lubusz Voivodeship.

It was created in 1815, when Prussia reorganised its internal administration. It comprised the mostly rural eastern part of Brandenburg, including the New March and Lower Lusatia. From 1871 Prussia itself was part of the newly founded German Empire.

In 1938 the districts of Arnswalde and Friedeberg were disentangled from the Frankfurt Region and merged into the new government region called Frontier of Posen-West Prussia, which was incorporated into the Province of Pomerania. At the same time the districts of Meseritz and Schwerin (Warthe), were transferred out of what had previously been defined as the Province of Posen-West Prussia, now becoming part of the Frankfurt Region.

In aggregate these changes reduced the land area of the Frankfurt Region from 20,731 km^{2} to 18,390 km^{2}.

In 1945 the part of the region to the east of the Oder and Western Neisse rivers (the Oder–Neisse line) became part of Poland while the western part fell within the Soviet Zone of occupation in Germany. West of the Oder–Neisse line, the Land of Brandenburg, created in 1946, was not administratively subdivided into "government regions". Three years later, however, the newly evolving East German state undertook further administrative reforms in 1952 and the western areas of the former Frankfurt Region became part of the new Frankfurt Bezirk (district).

== Demographics ==
According to the Prussian census of 1890, the Frankfurt Region had a population of 1,137,157, of which 1,090,794 (95.92%) spoke German, 36,720 (3.23%) spoke Sorbian, 4,813 (0.42%) spoke Polish, 413 (0.04%) spoke Czech, and 3,993 (0.35%) identified as bilingual (speaking German and another language).

== Administrative Districts ==
Urban districts (Stadtkreise)

- Cottbus/Chóśebuz (1886–1950, and from 1954; 1947–1952, and from 1990 part of Brandenburg state)
- Forst (Lusatia)/Baršć (1897–1950; quarters west of the Oder merged in Cottbus district; from 1947 part of Brandenburg state)
- Frankfurt upon Oder (till 1827, 1877–1950, and from 1952; 1947–1952, and from 1990 part of Brandenburg state)
- Guben (1884–1950; quarters west of the Oder merged in Cottbus district; from 1947 part of Brandenburg state)
- Landsberg upon Warthe (1892–1945)

Rural districts (Kreise)

- Arnswalde (1818–1945; from 1938 part of Pomerania province), based in Neuwedell (till 1908), thereafter in Arnswalde
- Calau (1818–1950; from 1947 part of Brandenburg state), based in Calau
- Cottbus (1818–1952; from 1947 part of Brandenburg state), based in Cottbus/Chóśebuz
- Crossen (Oder) (1818–1945), based in Crossen upon Oder
- Cüstrin (till 1836; merged in Königsberg district), based in Küstrin
- Friedeberg (1816–1945; from 1938 part of Pomerania province), based in Friedeberg in the New March
- Guben (1818–1950; from 1947 part of Brandenburg state), based in Guben
- Königsberg (New March) (1816–15 March 1946, remainder west of the Oder merged into Angermünde, Lebus and Oberbarnim districts), based in Königsberg in the New March
- Landsberg (Warthe) (1818–1945), based in Landsberg upon Warthe
- Lebus (1816–1950; from 1947 part of Brandenburg state), based in Frankfurt upon Oder
- Luckau (1816–1952; from 1947 part of Brandenburg state), based in Luckau
- Lübben (Spreewald) (1816–1952; in 1835 Beeskow area ceded to Beeskow-Storkow; from 1947 part of Brandenburg state), based in Lübben in Spreewald/Lubin (Błota)
- Meseritz (1818–1945; till 1938 part of Posen-West Prussia), based in Meseritz
- Oststernberg (1873–1945; partitioned from Sternberg district), based in Zielenzig
- Schwerin (Warthe) (1887–1945; till 1938 part of Posen-West Prussia), based in Schwerin upon Warthe
- Soldin (1818–1945), based in Soldin
- Sorau (Lusatia) (1816–1 April 1946, remainder west of the Oder merged into Cottbus, Forst and Spremberg districts), based in Sorau in Lower Lusatia
- Spremberg (Lusatia) (1818–1993; in 1825 southern area ceded to the Silesian Hoyerswerda; 1947–1952, and from 1990 part of Brandenburg state), based in Spremberg
- Sternberg, (1816–1873; partitioned into Ost- and Weststernberg), based in Zielenzig (till 1852), thereafter in Drossen
- Weststernberg, (1873–1945; partitioned from Sternberg district), based in Drossen (till 1904), thereafter in Reppen
- Züllichau-Schwiebus; (1818–1945), based in Züllichau

== Regional presidents (Regierungspräsidenten) ==
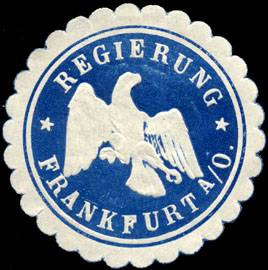
Sealing stamp of the Frankfurt Region, Weimar period

- 1848–1849: Karl Otto von Raumer
- 1850–1851: Karl Otto von Manteuffel
- 1851–1855: Carl Wilhelm von Bötticher
- 1856–1862: Werner von Selchow
- 1862–1867: Ferdinand von Münchhausen
- 1867–1873: Ferdinand von Nordenflycht
- 1890–1902: Jesco von Puttkamer
- 1902–1903: Ludwig von Windheim
- 1903–1906: Kurt von Dewitz
- 1906–1908: Rudolf von Valentini
- 1908–1918: Count Friedrich von Schwerin
- 1918–1919: Carl von Fidler
- 1919–1930: Ludwig Bartels
- 1930–1932: Wilhelm Fitzner
- 1932–1933: Kurt Schönner
- 1933–1935: Felix Eichler
- 1935–1936: Hermann Bresgen
- 1937–1945: Heinrich Refardt
