= Province of Brandenburg =

Province of Prussia (1815–1947)

Province of Brandenburg Provinz Brandenburg (German)
- Province of Prussia
- 1815–1947
- Flag (1815–1945) Coat of arms

- Brandenburg (red), within the Kingdom of Prussia (blue), within the German Empire

Anthem
- "Märkische Heide, märkischer Sand" (German) (English: "Brandenburglied")
- Capital: Potsdam (1815–1827); Berlin (1827–1843); Potsdam (1843–1918); Charlottenburg (1918–1920); Berlin (1920–1946)
- Area
  - 1939: 38,274 km^{2} (14,778 sq mi)
- Population
  - 1939: 3,023,443
- History
  - Established: 1815
  - Greater Berlin Act: 1 October 1920
  - Disestablished: 1947
- Political subdivisions: Potsdam; Frankfurt
Preceded by
Margraviate of Brandenburg
Succeeded by
Berlin
State of Brandenburg
District of Western Pomerania
District of Lower Silesia
- Today part of: Germany: ∟Berlin; ∟Brandenburg; ∟Mecklenburg-Vorpommern; ∟Saxony; ∟Saxony-Anhalt; Poland: ∟Lubusz; ∟West Pomerania

The Province of Brandenburg (German: Provinz Brandenburg) was a province of Prussia from 1815 to 1947. Brandenburg was established in 1815 from the Kingdom of Prussia's core territory, comprising the bulk of the historic Margraviate of Brandenburg (excluding Altmark) and the Lower Lusatia region. It became part of the German Empire in 1871 and was a province of the Free State of Prussia from 1918 until Prussia was dissolved in 1945 after World War II. With reduced territory it then became the East German State of Brandenburg, which was dissolved in 1952. Following the reunification of Germany in 1990, Brandenburg was re-established as a federal state of Germany.

Brandenburg's provincial capital alternated between Potsdam, Berlin and Charlottenburg at various times during its existence.

== Geography ==
Physical map of the Province of Brandenburg in 1905

The province comprised large parts of the North German Plain, stretching from the Elbe river in the west to beyond the Oder in the east, where the Neumark region bordered on the Prussian Grand Duchy of Posen (Province of Posen from 1848). Other neighbouring provinces were Pomerania in the northeast, Silesia in the southeast, and Prussian Saxony in the southwest. Brandenburg also shared a common border with the grand duchies of Mecklenburg-Schwerin and Mecklenburg-Strelitz in the northwest as well as with Anhalt in the west.

Beside the Elbe and Oder river areas, the province covered large parts of the Spree and Havel basins. The largest cities were Berlin, located in the centre of the province, along with its growing suburbs of Spandau, Charlottenburg, Schöneberg and Neukölln. Larger towns were the royal residence Potsdam, the regional capital Frankfurt (Oder), Landsberg (present-day Gorzów Wielkopolski, Poland), the historic capital Brandenburg an der Havel, plus Cottbus, Forst and Guben (today Gubin, Poland) in Lower Lusatia.

== History ==
=== Pre-provincial period ===
The first people who are known to have inhabited Brandenburg were the Germanic Suebi. During the Migration Period, they were succeeded by the Polabian Slavs, whose fortress at Brandenburg an der Havel was conquered by the German king Henry the Fowler in 928/29. Henry subdued the Slavic tribes up to the Oder river and his son Otto I established the marca Geronis on their territory, with the government first conferred to the Saxon count Gero.

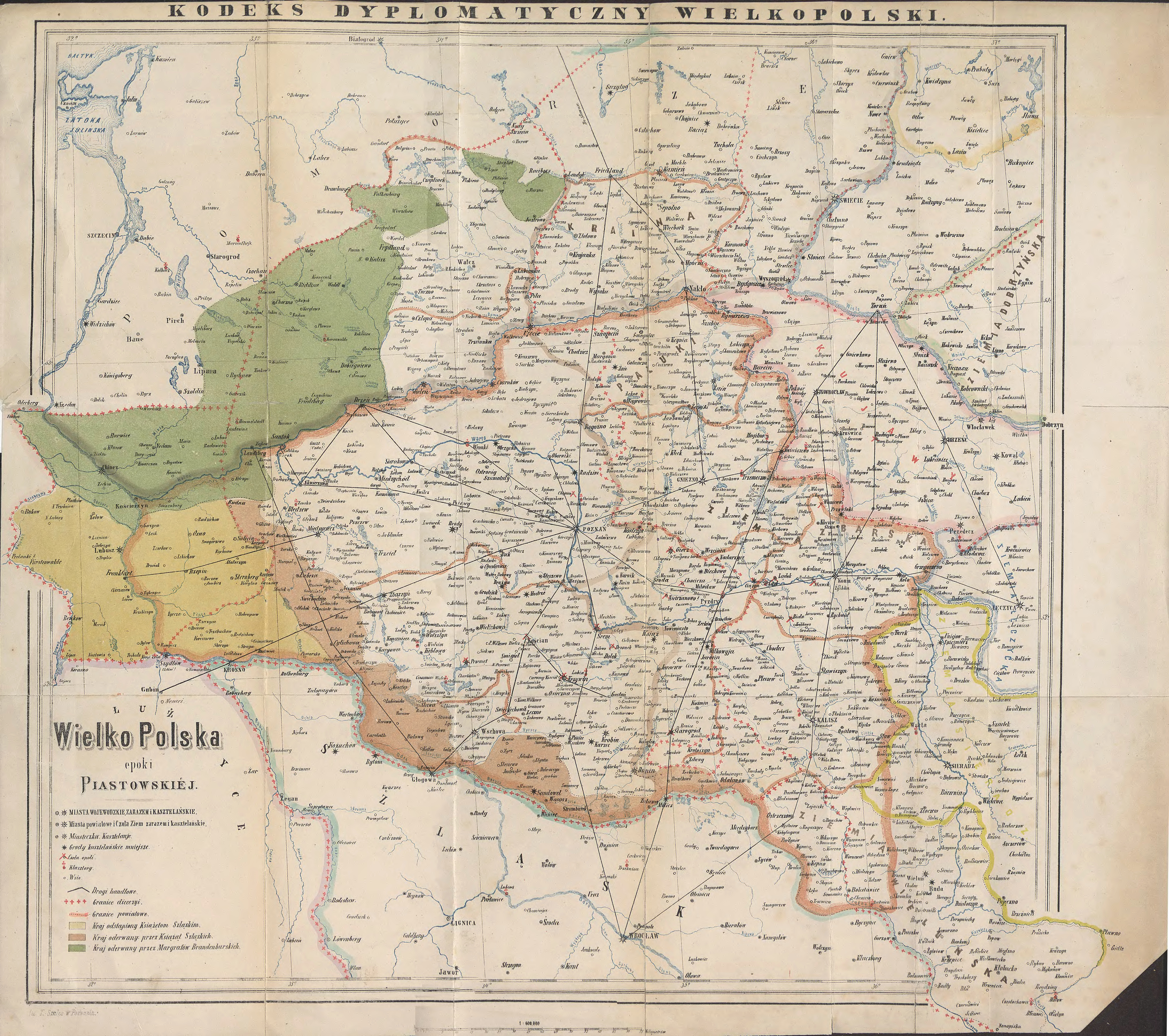
19th-century map of the 13th-century Duchy of Greater Poland of then fragmented Poland. Territories annexed by Brandenburg from Poland marked in yellow (Lubusz Land) and green (northwestern Greater Poland)

The Northern March was split off from the marca Geronis in 965, and large parts of it were lost in the Great Slav Rising of 983. The margravial title did not become hereditary until the time of Albert the Bear, another Saxon count from the noble House of Ascania, who established the Margraviate of Brandenburg in 1157. His son Margrave Otto I achieved the dignity of an arch-chamberlain of the Holy Roman Empire in 1177. Emperor Charles IV, by the Golden Bull of 1356, confirmed the electoral dignity of the Brandenburg margraves and in 1373 assigned the electorate to his son Wenceslaus. The Elector of Brandenburg held the seventh rank among the electors of the Empire and had five votes in the Council of Princes.

In 1415 Brandenburg was acquired by Burgrave Frederick of Nuremberg, the first member of the Swabian House of Hohenzollern to rule the margraviate. Over the centuries, the Hohenzollerns gradually rose to one of the most important dynasties of the Empire, rivalling the ruling House of Habsburg of the Holy Roman Empire, a process that intensified with the Protestant Reformation and the inheritance of the Polish Duchy of Prussia in 1618. The margraviate formed the core of the Brandenburg–Prussian state, and the "Great Elector" Frederick William I made various accessions to the territory, with the Treaty of Königsberg of 1656 marking a significant turn in its evolution. By the 1657 Treaty of Wehlau, Frederick William reached full sovereignty in his Prussian territories, which enabled his son Frederick I (Frederick III of Brandenburg) to assume the crown of a "King in Prussia" in 1701.

=== Establishment of the province ===
Map of province of Brandenburg (1896)

The Margraviate remained a constituent part of Prussia until after the Napoleonic Wars and the 1815 Congress of Vienna, when the Kingdom's administration was divided into ten provinces. Most of the Margraviate's territory was incorporated into the new province of Brandenburg, most notably the Mittelmark between the rivers Elbe and Oder and the Neumark region east of the Oder River. The Altmark, on the western bank of the Elbe, was incorporated into the Prussian Province of Saxony. The Province of Brandenburg also encompassed the territory of Lower Lusatia (where Cottbus had been a Brandenburgian exclave since the 15th century) as well as the area around Belzig and Jüterbog, all annexed from the Kingdom of Saxony because it had allied with Napoleon.

Population growth
Year	Population
1820	1,375,719
1850	2,156,736
1875	3,126,411
1910	4,092,616
1925	2,592,419

The Province, headed by an Oberpräsident, was subdivided into two governorates (Regierungsbezirke) named after their respective capitals, Potsdam in the northwest (incorporating the Mittelmark, Prignitz and the Uckermark) and Frankfurt (Oder) in the southeast (with the Neumark and Lower Lusatia). The provincial government was at first situated at the Potsdam royal residence. In 1827 it moved to Berlin, returned to Potsdam in 1843 and in 1918 settled in Charlottenburg. The Prussian capital Berlin originally formed part of the province, but in the course of the Industrial Revolution from the 1830s onwards it quickly developed to a major metropolis. From 1871 it was capital of the German Empire, and on 1 April 1881 it was made an autonomous city district (Stadtkreis Berlin) without, however, completely leaving the province. On 1 October 1920, Berlin was formally separated from the Province of Brandenburg.

In spite of the fact that serfdom had been officially abolished by the 1807 Prussian reforms, Brandenburg's rural outer regions were still characterised by the large-scale land holdings of the Junker nobility, similar to the situation in the eastern Prussian provinces of Silesia, Pomerania and East Prussia. The conditions in the countryside remained largely unchanged even during the Revolutions of 1848 that led to violent fights in the streets of Berlin. The large estates had to deal with low soil quality and – except for brown coal in Lower Lusatia – the lack of natural resources. Provincial life was portrayed in the novels of Theodor Fontane, especially in his 1862–89 descriptive work Wanderungen durch die Mark Brandenburg ("Ramblings through the Mark Brandenburg").

=== Free State of Prussia ===
The Province of Brandenburg in the Weimar Republic after the 1920 expansion of Berlin. The remainder of the Free State of Prussia is the area with the lightest shade.

After World War I, the Kingdom of Prussia was replaced by the Free State of Prussia as part of the Weimar Republic. Brandenburg became a province of the Free State without any change in size, although as a result of Germany's territorial losses under the terms of the 1919 Treaty of Versailles, it had a 35 km (22 mi) long border with the Second Polish Republic. The 1920 Greater Berlin Act expanded the borders of the German capital, incorporating numerous surrounding districts and towns from Brandenburg, including Charlottenburg, the seat of its provincial government. As a result of the expansion, Brandenburg lost half of its population and two-thirds of its tax base.

After Adolf Hitler was named Chancellor of Germany on 30 January 1933, the Nazi Gauleiter Wilhelm Kube was appointed Oberpräsident of Brandenburg. He was succeeded by Emil Stürtz in 1936. Brandenburg was home to the concentration camps Sachsenhausen and Ravensbrück and the residences of important Nazi leaders such as Hermann Göring's Carinhall.

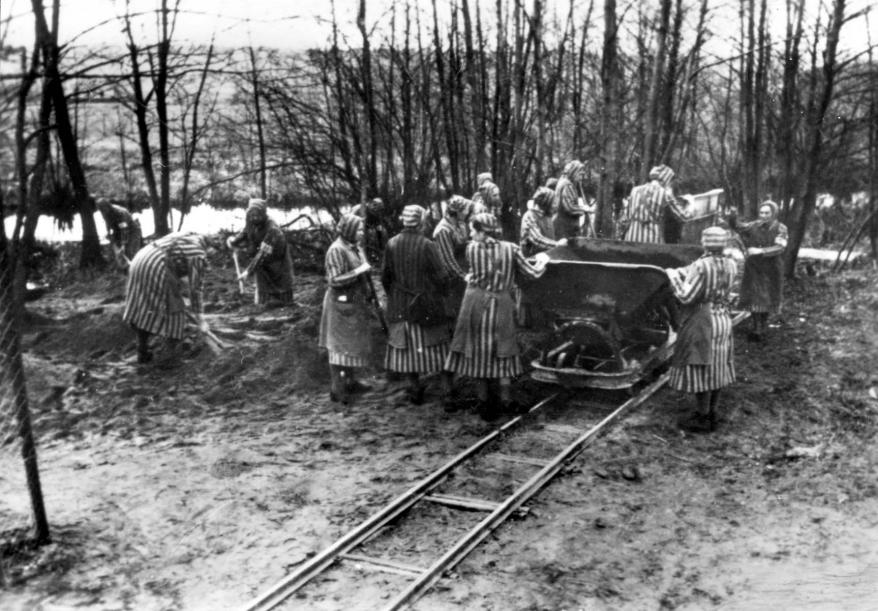
Female prisoners at Ravensbrück concentration camp, 1939

During the war, Germany operated several prisoner-of-war camps with numerous forced labour subcamps in the province. They included Stalag III-A, Stalag III-B, Stalag III-C, Stalag III-D, Oflag II-A, Oflag III-A, Oflag III-B, Oflag III-C, Oflag 8 and Oflag 80 for Polish, Belgian, British, Dutch, French, Serbian, Italian, American, Czechoslovak, Soviet, Romanian, Greek, Bulgarian and other Allied POWs. In early 1945, the death marches of prisoners from various dissolved camps passed through the region.

In the late days of World War II, Brandenburg was the site of the bloody battles against the Soviet and Polish armies at the Seelow Heights, Halbe and finally the Battle of Berlin.

In 1945, after the war, the Neumark territory east of the Oder–Neisse line was ceded to the Republic of Poland to form the Zielona Gora Voivodeship (part of Poznan Voivodeship between 1945 and 1950; it became Lubusz Voivodeship in 1998 after merging with Gorzów Voivodeship). The remaining territory was part of the Soviet occupation zone as the state of Brandenburg, with its capital at Potsdam. It became part of East Germany when it was established in 1949. Along with the other states of East Germany, Brandenburg was dissolved in 1952 and divided into administrative districts. Brandenburg's territory roughly corresponded with the districts of Potsdam, Frankfurt/Oder and Cottbus. In 1990, following German reunification, Brandenburg was re-established as a state of the Federal Republic of Germany.

== Demographics ==
Mother tongues and religious confessions of Brandenburg, 1905

According to the 1905 census, the total population of the Province of Brandenburg was 3,531,906 persons, of whom 97% declared German to be their mother tongue. Notable language minorities included Sorbians, who constituted 1% of the provincial population and overwhelmingly inhabited largely rural areas in Lower Lusatia, north of Cottbus in the Spreewald. Polish speakers, who constituted 1.3% of the population, were mostly concentrated in urban areas and the lignite mining regions in Lower Lusatia, as well as in farming communities in the Uckermark.

The following tables contain data collected by the Prussian statistical office from the census of 1905:

Region	German	Polish, Masurian, and Kashubian	Wendish	English	Another language	German & another language	Total
Regierungsbezirk Potsdam	2,280,372 (97.9%)	30,233 (1.3%)	179 (0.0%)	2,604 (0.1%)	10,162 (0.4%)	6,335 (0.3%)	2,329,885
Regierungsbezirk Frankfurt	1,144,647 (95.2%)	16,224 (1.3%)	34,614 (2.9%)	64 (0.0%)	2,625 (0.2%)	3,847 (0.3%)	1,202,021
Province Brandenburg	3,425,019 (97.0%)	46,457 (1.3%)	34,793 (1.0%)	2,668 (0.1%)	12,787 (0.4%)	10,182 (0.3%)	3,531,906

Haupt- und Residenzstadt Berlin	German	Polish, Masurian, and Kashubian	Russian	Czech	Another language	German & another language	Total
Berlin	1,981,923 (97.1%)	24,281 (1.2%)	4,434 (0.2%)	2,440 (0.1%)	14,713 (0.7%)	12,357 (0.6%)	2,040,148

Regierungsbezirk Potsdam
Kreis	German	Polish, Masurian, and Kashubian	Wendish	English	Another language	German & another language	Total
Prenzlau	58,440 (95.0%)	2,834 (4.6%)	(0.0%)	(0.0%)	130 (0.2%)	134 (0.2%)	61,538
Templin	47,991 (96.8%)	1,382 (2.8%)	(0.0%)	3 (0.0%)	86 (0.2%)	92 (0.2%)	49,554
Angermünde	63,690 (97.7%)	1,313 (2.0%)	(0.0%)	14 (0.0%)	41 (0.1%)	144 (0.2%)	65,202
Oberbarnim	95,605 (98.8%)	954 (1.0%)	(0.0%)	27 (0.0%)	116 (0.1%)	113 (0.1%)	96,815
Lichtenberg (Stadtkreis)	54,420 (98.2%)	598 (1.1%)	(0.0%)	8 (0.0%)	134 (0.2%)	231 (0.4%)	55,391
Niederbarnim	330,048 (98.2%)	3,470 (1.0%)	28 (0.0%)	215 (0.1%)	1,133 (0.3%)	1,236 (0.4%)	336,130
Charlottenburg (Stadtkreis)	230,044 (96.0%)	4,192 (1.7%)	30 (0.0%)	980 (0.4%)	3,097 (1.3%)	1,289 (0.5%)	239,632
Schöneberg (Stadtkreis)	137,608 (97.6%)	1,053 (0.7%)	35 (0.0%)	535 (0.4%)	1,275 (0.9%)	504 (0.4%)	141,010
Rixdorf (Stadtkreis)	150,945 (98.3%)	1,234 (0.8%)	5 (0.0%)	20 (0.0%)	638 (0.4%)	730 (0.5%)	153,572
Deutsch Wilmersdorf (Stadtkreis)	61,374 (96.5%)	631 (1.0%)	27 (0.0%)	395 (0.6%)	914 (1.4%)	227 (0.4%)	63,568
Teltow	306,883 (97.8%)	4,323 (1.4%)	30 (0.0%)	255 (0.1%)	1,537 (0.5%)	780 (0.2%)	313,808
Beeskow-Storkow	46,046 (98.7%)	517 (1.1%)	2 (0.0%)	(0.0%)	37 (0.1%)	47 (0.1%)	46,649
Jüterbog-Luckenwalde	72,549 (99.4%)	243 (0.3%)	6 (0.0%)	5 (0.0%)	120 (0.2%)	44 (0.1%)	72,967
Zauch-Belzig	84,259 (99.6%)	262 (0.3%)	(0.0%)	6 (0.0%)	66 (0.1%)	40 (0.0%)	84,633
Potsdam (Stadtkreis)	60,850 (99.1%)	174 (0.3%)	1 (0.0%)	51 (0.1%)	206 (0.3%)	132 (0.2%)	61,414
Spandau (Stadtkreis)	69,004 (98.2%)	1,000 (1.4%)	2 (0.0%)	15 (0.0%)	97 (0.1%)	184 (0.3%)	70,302
Osthavelland	75,628 (97.8%)	1,357 (1.8%)	9 (0.0%)	5 (0.0%)	85 (0.1%)	233 (0.3%)	77,317
Brandenburg a./Havel (Stadtkreis)	50,463 (98.5%)	607 (1.2%)	(0.0%)	8 (0.0%)	131 (0.3%)	30 (0.1%)	51,239
Westhavelland	63,998 (97.5%)	1,481 (2.3%)	1 (0.0%)	2 (0.0%)	73 (0.1%)	52 (0.1%)	65,607
Ruppin	75,772 (98.1%)	1,315 (1.7%)	3 (0.0%)	11 (0.0%)	70 (0.1%)	31 (0.0%)	77,202
Ostprignitz	66,572 (98.9%)	672 (1.0%)	(0.0%)	3 (0.0%)	30 (0.0%)	30 (0.0%)	67,307
Westprignitz	78,183 (98.9%)	621 (0.8%)	(0.0%)	46 (0.1%)	146 (0.2%)	32 (0.0%)	79,028
Total (Reg. Potsdam)	2,280,372 (97.9%)	30,233 (1.3%)	179 (0.0%)	2,604 (0.1%)	10,162 (0.4%)	6,335 (0.3%)	2,329,885

Regierungsbezirk Frankfurt
Regierungsbezirk Potsdam	German	Polish, Masurian, and Kashubian	Wendish	English	Another language	German & another language	Total
Königsberg I.Neumark	95,018 (98.5%)	1,304 (1.4%)	1 (0.0%)	4 (0.0%)	78 (0.1%)	100 (0.1%)	96,505
Soldin	45,730 (98.1%)	796 (1.7%)	1 (0.0%)	1 (0.0%)	47 (0.1%)	33 (0.1%)	46,608
Arnswalde	41,043 (97.8%)	885 (2.1%)	(0.0%)	3 (0.0%)	37 (0.1%)	19 (0.0%)	41,987
Friedeberg I./Neumark	53,378 (98.8%)	512 (0.9%)	1 (0.0%)	(0.0%)	20 (0.0%)	103 (0.2%)	54,014
Landsberg a./Warthe (Stadtkreis)	35,787 (96.9%)	200 (0.5%)	(0.0%)	9 (0.0%)	776 (2.1%)	162 (0.4%)	36,934
Landsberg (Landkreis)	55,222 (99.2%)	399 (0.7%)	(0.0%)	1 (0.0%)	19 (0.0%)	49 (0.1%)	55,690
Lebus	91,858 (97.3%)	2,190 (2.3%)	(0.0%)	5 (0.0%)	318 (0.3%)	84 (0.1%)	94,455
Frankfurt a./Oder (Stadtkreis)	63,412 (98.6%)	690 (1.1%)	2 (0.0%)	10 (0.0%)	56 (0.1%)	134 (0.2%)	64,304
Weststernberg	43,390 (99.4%)	213 (0.5%)	1 (0.0%)	(0.0%)	44 (0.1%)	19 (0.0%)	43,667
Oststernberg	44,452 (99.9%)	41 (0.1%)	(0.0%)	(0.0%)	2 (0.0%)	6 (0.0%)	44,501
Züllichau-Schwiebus	46,640 (98.3%)	735 (1.5%)	(0.0%)	(0.0%)	33 (0.1%)	41 (0.1%)	47,449
Krossen	59,042 (99.6%)	163 (0.3%)	1 (0.0%)	1 (0.0%)	13 (0.0%)	32 (0.1%)	59,252
Guben (Stadtkreis)	36,343 (99.2%)	130 (0.4%)	32 (0.1%)	12 (0.0%)	68 (0.2%)	51 (0.1%)	36,636
Guben (Landkreis)	42,895 (97.9%)	134 (0.3%)	424 (1.0%)	1 (0.0%)	355 (0.8%)	24 (0.1%)	43,833
Lübben	33,659 (99.5%)	73 (0.2%)	76 (0.2%)	1 (0.0%)	18 (0.1%)	18 (0.1%)	33,845
Luckau	69,174 (98.9%)	703 (1.0%)	15 (0.0%)	2 (0.0%)	42 (0.1%)	15 (0.0%)	69,951
Calau	76,365 (89.6%)	5,463 (6.4%)	2,316 (2.7%)	2 (0.0%)	240 (0.3%)	838 (1.0%)	85,224
Kottbus (Stadtkreis)	44,862 (97.0%)	300 (0.6%)	864 (1.9%)	3 (0.0%)	75 (0.2%)	166 (0.4%)	46,270
Kottbus (Landkreis)	19,051 (38.2%)	123 (0.2%)	29,989 (60.1%)	(0.0%)	11 (0.0%)	710 (1.4%)	49,884
Forst (Stadtkreis)	33,541 (99.4%)	24 (0.1%)	53 (0.2%)	4 (0.0%)	39 (0.1%)	91 (0.3%)	33,752
Sorau	83,917 (98.3%)	632 (0.7%)	94 (0.1%)	2 (0.0%)	204 (0.2%)	485 (0.6%)	85,334
Spremberg	29,868 (93.6%)	514 (1.6%)	744 (2.3%)	3 (0.0%)	130 (0.4%)	667 (2.1%)	31,926
Total (Reg. Frankfurt)	1,144,647 (95.2%)	16,224 (1.3%)	34,614 (2.9%)	64 (0.0%)	2,625 (0.2%)	3,847 (0.3%)	1,202,021

== Government ==
The Prussian central government appointed an Oberpräsident ("upper president") for every province who carried out the state's functions on the provincial level and supervised the implementation of central policy at the lower levels of administration. In 1824 Brandenburg established a provincial Landtag (parliament). It served in an advisory role on proposed laws, with no decision-making or budgetary authority. Its primary function was administrative. Elections of its members were estates-based: the nobility and clergy received half of the seats in the Landtag, and representatives of the cities, farmers and hereditary tenants the remainder. Voting rights for all estates were based on landholdings of a specified size.

Under its 1848 constitution, the Kingdom of Prussia set up a two-chamber Landtag that served as the representative assembly for all of Prussia's provinces. The members of its lower house, the Prussian House of Representatives, were elected using the Prussian three-class franchise, which weighted votes based on the amount of taxes paid.

The provincial ordinance of 1875 strengthened self-rule within the provinces. Brandenburg's Landtag elected a provincial executive body, a provincial committee (Provinzialausschuss) and a head of province, the Landesdirektor ("Provincial Director"). The estates-based election system was abolished in favor of an indirect election: the district councils of each urban and rural district (Kreis) elected two members to the Landtag. It convened once a year to adopt the provincial budget. Its other responsibilities were administrative, overseeing such areas as public works, social welfare, urban development and the arts and sciences.

The first Weimar era Landtag election took place under the indirect voting system of the imperial period. It was not until the 1921 election that a universal, direct and equal franchise was used; three years later, the first woman was elected to the Landtag. Its functions remained non-legislative. As in the Empire, its functions were administrative except for the adoption of the budget.

=== Upper Presidents of Brandenburg ===
- 1815–1824: Georg Friedrich Christian von Heydebreck (1765–1828)
- 1825–1840: Friedrich Magnus von Bassewitz (1773–1858)
- 1840–1842: vacant
- 1842–1848: August Werner von Meding (1792–1871)
- 1848–1849: Robert von Patow (1804–1890), per pro
- 1849–1850: vacant
- 1849–1850: August Hermann Klemens Freiherr Wolff von Metternich (1803–1872), per pro
- 1850–1858: Eduard Heinrich von Flottwell (1786–1865)
- 1859–1862: Eduard Heinrich von Flottwell (1786–1865)
- 1862: Werner Ludolph Erdmann von Selchow (1806–1884)
- 1862–1879: Gustav Wilhelm von Jagow (1813–1879)
- 1879–1899: Heinrich von Achenbach (1829–1899)
- 1899–1905: Theobald von Bethmann Hollweg (1856–1921)
- 1905–1909: August von Trott zu Solz (1855–1938)
- 1909–1910: Friedrich Wilhelm von Loebell (1855–1931)
- 1910–1914: Alfred von Conrad (1852–1914)
- 1914–1917: Rudolf von der Schulenburg (1860–1930)
- 1917–1919: Friedrich Wilhelm von Loebell (1855–1931)
- 1919–1933:Adolf Maier (1871–1963), DDP
- 1933–1936: Wilhelm Kube (1887–1943), NSDAP
- 1937–1945: Emil Stürtz (1892–1945), NSDAP, since 1936 per pro

=== Land Directors of Brandenburg ===
- 1876–1896: Albert Erdmann Karl Gerhard von Levetzow (1827–1903), German Conservative Party
- 1896–1912: Otto Karl Gottlob von Manteuffel (1844–1913), German Conservative Party
- 1912–1930: Joachim von Winterfeldt-Menkin (1865–1945)
- 1930–1933: Hugo Swart (1885–1952)
- 1933–1944: Dietloff von Arnim (1876–1945), NSDAP

== Subdivisions ==
Administrative map as of 1905

From 1822 the province of Brandenburg was divided into two Regierungsbezirke (governorates): Frankfurt and Potsdam. Between 1816 and 1822 there was a third governorate – the Governorate of Berlin – comprising the urban district of Berlin, the city of Charlottenburg and the municipalities of Gesundbrunnen, Lichtenberg, and Stralau. In 1822 the Berlin region merged into the Potsdam region.

=== Regierungsbezirk Berlin ===
Established in 1816, this governorate, an enclave in the Potsdam region, merged into the latter in 1822.

=== Regierungsbezirk Frankfurt ===
Urban districts (Stadtkreise)

1. Cottbus (1886–1950, and from 1954; 1947–1952, and from 1990 part of Brandenburg state)
2. Forst (Lusatia) (1897–1950; quarters west of the Oder merged in Cottbus district; from 1947 part of Brandenburg state)
3. Frankfurt (Oder) (until 1827, 1877–1950, and from 1952; 1947–1952, and from 1990 part of Brandenburg state)
4. Guben (1884–1950; quarters west of the Oder merged in Cottbus district; from 1947 part of Brandenburg state)
5. Landsberg (Warthe) (1892–1945)

Rural districts (Landkreise)

1. Arnswalde (1818–1945; from 1938 part of Pomerania province)
2. Calau (1818–1950; from 1947 part of Brandenburg state)
3. Cottbus (1818–1952; from 1947 part of Brandenburg state)
4. Crossen (Oder) (1818–1945)
5. Cüstrin (until 1836; merged into Königsberg district)
6. Friedeberg Nm. (i.e. in the New March; 1816–1945; from 1938 part of Pomerania province)
7. Guben (1818–1950; from 1947 part of Brandenburg state)
8. Königsberg Nm. (i.e. in the New March; 1816–15 March 1946, remainder west of the Oder merged into Angermünde, Lebus and Oberbarnim districts)
9. Landsberg (Warthe) (1818–1945)
10. Lebus (1816–1950; from 1947 part of Brandenburg state)
11. Luckau (1816–1952; from 1947 part of Brandenburg state)
12. Lübben (Spreewald) (1816–1952; in 1835 Beeskow area ceded to Beeskow-Storkow; from 1947 part of Brandenburg state)
13. Meseritz (1818–1945; until 1938 part of Posen-West Prussia)
14. Oststernberg (1873–1945; partitioned from Sternberg district)
15. Schwerin (Warthe) (1887–1945; until 1938 part of Posen-West Prussia)
16. Soldin (1818–1945)
17. Sorau (Lusatia) (1816–1 April 1946, remainder west of the Oder merged into Cottbus, Forst and Spremberg districts)
18. Spremberg (Lusatia) (1818–1993; 1947–1952, and from 1990 part of Brandenburg state)
19. Sternberg (1816–1873; partitioned into Ost- and Weststernberg)
20. Weststernberg (1873–1945; partitioned from Sternberg district)
21. Züllichau-Schwiebus (1818–1945)

=== Regierungsbezirk Potsdam ===
Urban districts (Stadtkreise)

1. Berlin (1822–1881; on 1 April 1881 the city was disentangled from the province of Brandenburg.)
2. Brandenburg (Havel) (from 1881; from 1947 part of Brandenburg state)
3. Charlottenburg (1877–1920; merged in Greater Berlin)
4. Eberswalde (1911–1950; merged in Oberbarnim district; from 1947 part of Brandenburg state)
5. Lichtenberg (1908–1920; from 1912: known as Berlin-Lichtenberg; merged in Greater Berlin)
6. Potsdam (from 1809; 1947–1952, and from 1990 part of Brandenburg state)
7. Rathenow (1925–1950; merged in Westhavelland district; from 1947 part of Brandenburg state)
8. Rixdorf (1899–1920; from 1912: known as Berlin-Neukölln; merged in Greater Berlin)
9. Schöneberg (1899–1920; from 1912: known as Berlin-Schöneberg; merged in Greater Berlin)
10. Spandau (1886–1920; merged in Greater Berlin)
11. Wilmersdorf (1907–1920; from 1912: known as Berlin-Wilmersdorf; merged in Greater Berlin)
12. Wittenberge (1922–1950; merged in Westprignitz district; from 1947 part of Brandenburg state)

Rural districts (Landkreise)

1. Angermünde (1818–1952; from 1947 part of Brandenburg state)
2. Beeskow-Storkow (1836–1950; combined from partitioned parts of Teltow-Storkow and Lübben; from 1947 part of Brandenburg state)
3. Jüterbog-Luckenwalde (renamed as Luckenwalde district in 1946; 1818–1952; from 1947 part of Brandenburg state)
4. Niederbarnim (i.e. Lower Barnim; 1818–1952; widely merged in Greater Berlin in 1920; from 1947 remainder part of Brandenburg state)
5. Oberbarnim (i.e. Upper Barnim; 1818–1952; from 1947 part of Brandenburg state)
6. Osthavelland (i.e. Eastern Havelland; 1816–1952; widely merged in Greater Berlin in 1920; from 1947 remainder part of Brandenburg state)
7. Ostprignitz (i.e. Eastern Prignitz; 1818–1952; from 1947 part of Brandenburg state)
8. Prenzlau (1818–1952; from 1947 part of Brandenburg state)
9. Ruppin (1818–1952; from 1947 part of Brandenburg state)
10. Teltow (1836–1952; partitioned from Teltow-Storkow; widely merged in Greater Berlin in 1920; from 1947 remainder part of Brandenburg state)
11. Teltow-Storkow (1816–1835; partitioned into Teltow and Storkow, which merged with northern Lübben to Beeskow-Storkow)
12. Templin (1818–1952; from 1947 part of Brandenburg state)
13. Westhavelland (i.e. Western Havelland; 1816–1952; from 1947 part of Brandenburg state)
14. Westprignitz (i.e. Western Prignitz; 1818–1952; from 1947 part of Brandenburg state)
15. Zauch-Belzig (1817–1952; from 1947 part of Brandenburg state)
