= Oststernberg district =

District of Prussia, Germany

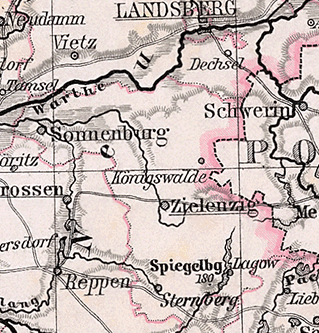
Oststernberg district (1905)

The district of Oststernberg (German: Landkreis Oststernberg) existed in the Prussian Province of Brandenburg in Germany from 1873 to 1945. Today, the former territory of the district is part of the Sulęcin County of the Lubusz Voivodeship in Poland. The district included the four towns of Königswalde, Sonnenburg, Sternberg (Neumark) and Zielenzig.

== History ==
The district was created in 1873 when the Sternberg district was split into the Oststernberg and Weststernberg districts. The district office of the new Oststernberg district was in the town of Zielenzig.

In the spring of 1945, the district was occupied by the Soviet Red Army. After the end of the war, the district was placed under Polish administration. The local German population was expelled shortly thereafter and the influx of Polish and Ukrainian migrants began, some of whom came from areas east of the Curzon Line that had fallen to the Soviet Union.

== Population ==
Year	Population	Source
1871	48,476	
1890	50,449	
1900	47,910	
1910	44,238	
1925	43,890	
1933	41,963	
1939	40,595	

== Municipalities ==
At the end of its existence in 1945, the district comprised four towns and 73 other municipalities:

- Albrechtsbruch
- Alt Limmritz
- Arensdorf
- Beatenwalde
- Beaulieu
- Breesen
- Brenkenhofsfleiß
- Burschen
- Ceylon
- Dammbusch
- Freiberg
- Gartow
- Glauschdorf
- Gleißen
- Grabow
- Grochow
- Groß Friedrich
- Grunow b. Wutschdorf
- Hammer
- Hampshire
- Heinersdorf
- Herzogswalde
- Jamaika
- Kemnath
- Költschen
- Königswalde, town
- Koritten
- Korsika
- Kriescht
- Lagow
- Langenfeld
- Langenpfuhl
- Louisa
- Malkendorf
- Malsow
- Malta
- Mauskow
- Meekow
- Neu Dresden
- Neu Lagow
- Neu Limmritz
- Neudorf
- Neuwalde
- Ögnitz
- Osterwalde
- Ostrow
- Pensylvanien
- Petersdorf
- Priebrow
- Rauden
- Reichen
- Reitzenstein
- Sankt Johannes
- Saratoga
- Schartowsthal
- Scheiblersburg
- Schermeisel
- Schönow
- Schönwalde
- Schwarzsee
- Seeren
- Selchow
- Sonnenburg, town
- Sophienwalde
- Spiegelberg
- Sternberg Nm., town
- Streitwalde
- Stuttgardt
- Sumatra
- Tauerzig
- Tempel
- Trebow
- Waldowstrenk
- Wallwitz
- Wandern
- Woxfelde
- Zielenzig, town
