= Sulęcin =

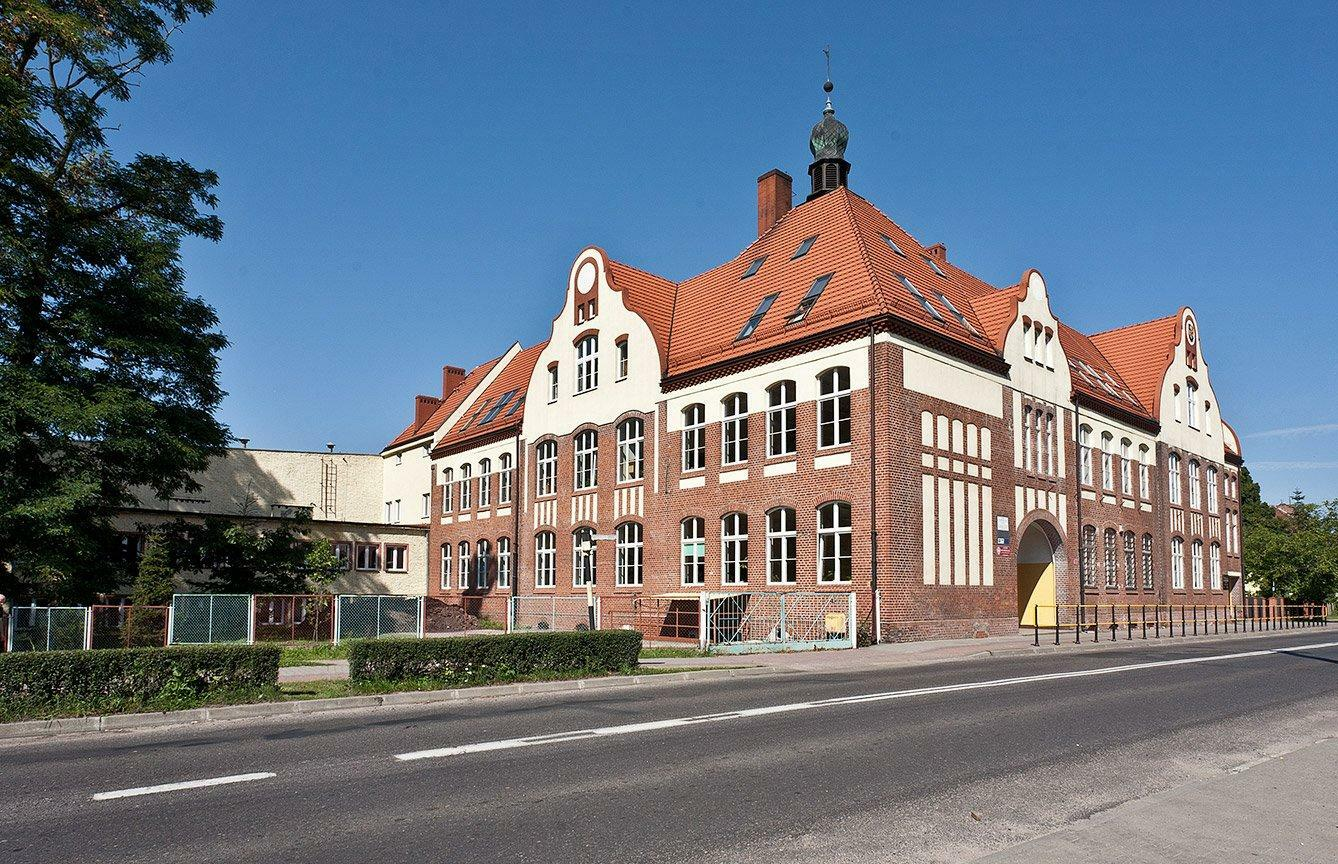
- High school in Sulęcin

- Flag Coat of arms

- Location within Poland
- Coordinates: 52°27′N 15°7′E
- Country: Poland
- Voivodeship: Lubusz
- County: Sulęcin
- Gmina: Sulęcin
- Town rights: 1244

Government
  - Mayor: Dariusz Ejchart

Area
  - Total: 8.56 km^{2} (3.31 sq mi)

Population (2019-06-30)
  - Total: 10,117
  - Density: 1,180/km^{2} (3,060/sq mi)
- Time zone: UTC+1 (CET)
  - Summer (DST): UTC+2 (CEST)
- Postal code: 69-200
- Area code: +48 95
- Car plates: FSU
- Website: http://www.sulecin.pl

Sulęcin (Polish pronunciation: [suˈlɛɲtɕin]; German: Zielenzig) is a town in western Poland with 10,117 inhabitants (2019), the capital of Sulecin County, since 1999 in Lubusz Voivodeship.

== Geography ==
Sulęcin is located in the center of Lubusz Voivodeship (Lubuskie province), by the river Postomia, tributary of the Warta River, in the historical Lubusz Land. The surrounding landscape is formed by many hillocks on the plateau of Lubusz. The highest of them is the Bukowiec (227 m). The closest big city is Gorzów Wielkopolski (45 km (28 mi)). Over 50% of the area of the Sulecin Commune is occupied by forests.

== History ==
=== Middle Ages ===
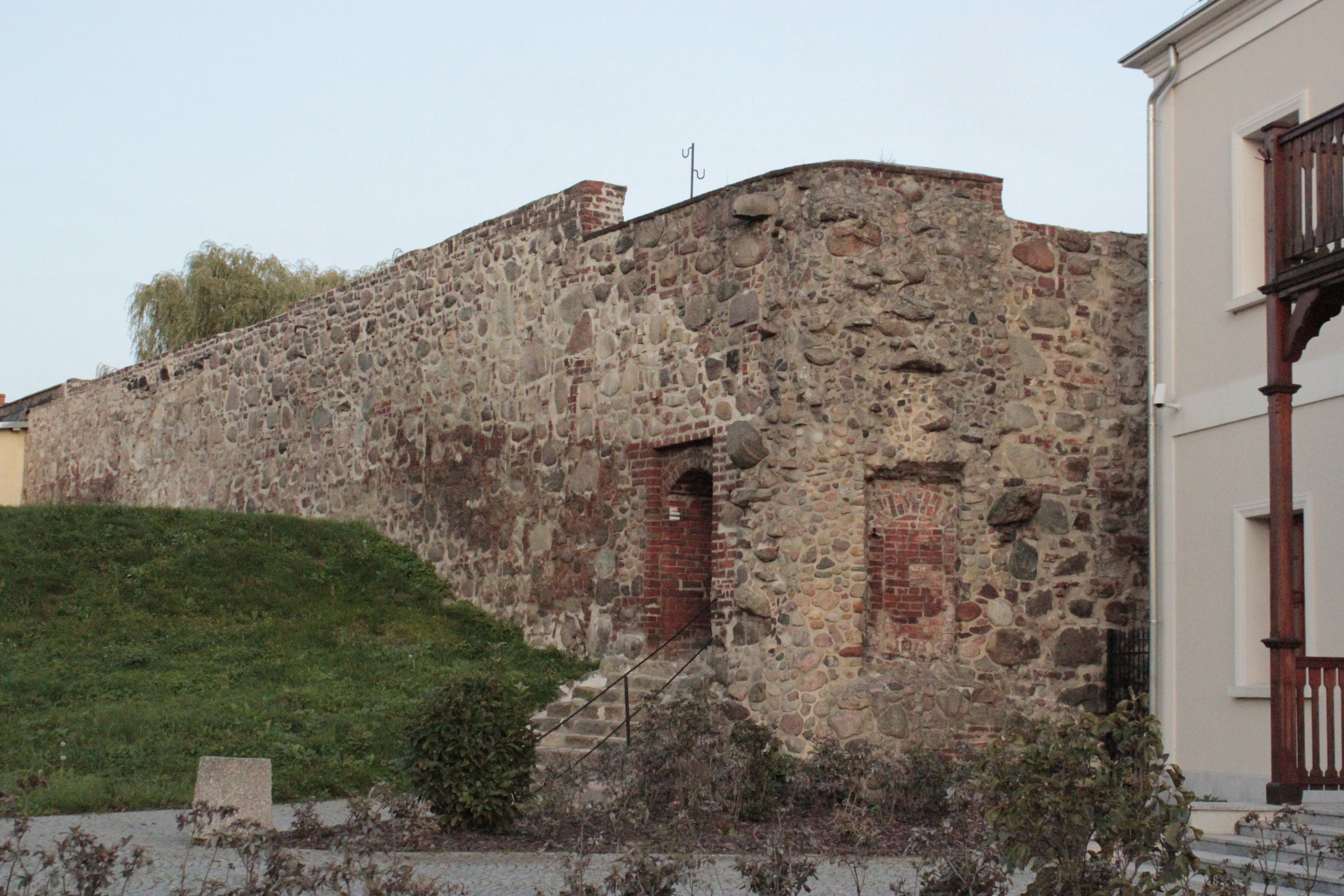
Medieval town walls

Excavations have shown that the area around Sulęcin was inhabited already in the 2nd century BC. The area formed part of Poland after the establishment of the state in the 10th century. The town developed from a Slavic settlement. The town was mentioned for the first time in documents in 1241 when bishop Henry granted nobleman Mrotsek the right to build a new settlement for Germans. Until the 12th century under dominion of the Silesian line of the Piast dynasty, the town with 10 surrounding villages was handed over by Polish Duke Henry I the Bearded to Mroczko from Pogorzela, who in 1244 gave it to the Knights Templar. In 1249 Zielenzig became a part of the Margraviate of Brandenburg. In 1269 Otto, the Margrave of Brandenburg ordered to build a castle in the town. It was destroyed by the Polish army of Duke Bolesław the Pious in retaliation for a Brandenburg invasion. After disbanding of the Knights Templar Order by Pope Clement V in 1312 Sulęcin was ruled by the Knights Hospitaller. They leased the town in 1318 to the Brandenburg Margrave Woldemar. After a war broke out over control of the region in 1319, the town came under Polish control again, as part of the Duchy of Głogów. Duke Henry IV the Faithful confirmed the rights of the Knights Hospitaller to the town and the castle, by virtue of a document issued in 1322 in nearby Lubniewice. By 1326 the town fell to Brandenburg again. It stayed under the supremacy of the Knights Hospitaller until 1810.

Between 1373 and 1415 it was part of the Lands of the Bohemian (Czech) Crown. In 1419 Sulęcin suffered a severe damage, as the Hussite Wars reached the city.

=== Modern era ===
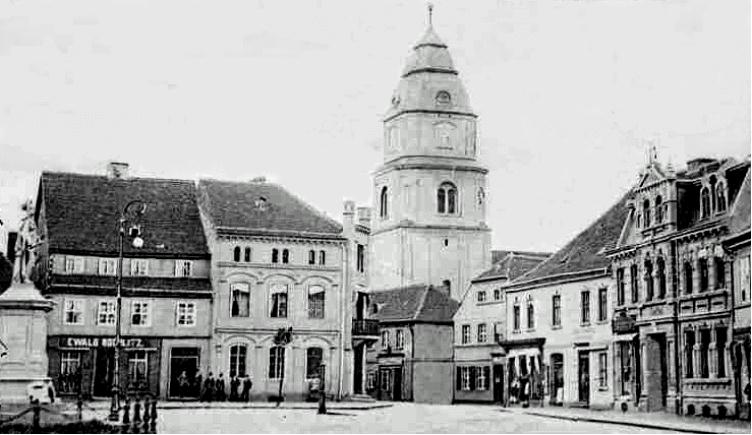
Main square view on postcard, 1905

In 1574 the Polish nobility and clergy of Greater Poland welcomed in Zielenzig the first elected King of Poland, Henry of Valois. In 1591, the first school was established in the town. In 1689, Polish princess Theresa Kunegunda Sobieska stayed in Sulęcin.

From the 18th century the town was part of the Kingdom of Prussia, under the Germanized name Zielenzig. In 1733 Frederick William I, King of Prussia visited the town. During the Napoleonic Wars, from 1806 to 1812 the town remained under French control.

As a result of the new Prussian district division of 1818 a new district Landkreis Sternberg was established. Zielenzig was its capital of until 1852. In 1873 Sternberg was divided into Oststernberg district with Zielenzig as a capital and Weststernberg district. At that time the city's industry was based on textile production and mills. In the middle of the 19th century the number of inhabitants reached 4500. After the discovery of lignite in the vicinity of the city a briquette factory was set up in Zielenzig. This led to the development of infrastructure and resulted in an increase of the population to 5769 inhabitants in 1885. After World War I a number of companies involved in timber processing set up in the town. The number of residents in 1939 according to the last German census was 5867.

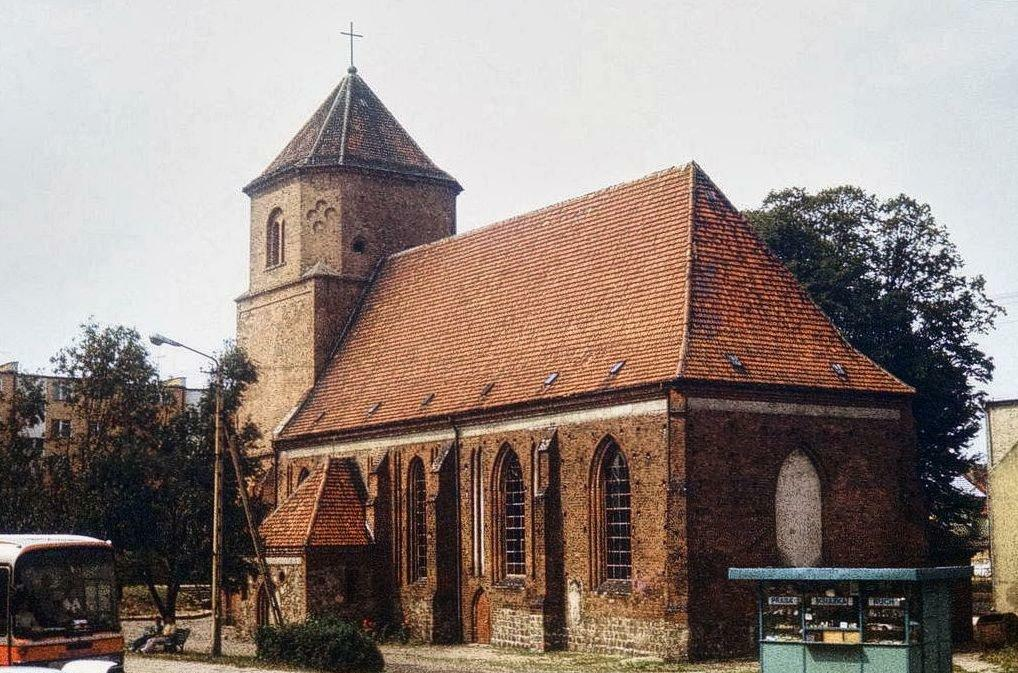
Saint Nicholas church in Sulęcin in 1989

On 2 May 1945 Sulęcin was taken by the Red Army. Although there was no resistance, the houses in the city center were plundered by the soldiers and set on fire. As a result, around 50% of Sulęcin was completely destroyed.

After Nazi Germany's defeat in World War II, the town once again became part of Poland, and its German population was expelled in accordance to the Potsdam Agreement. It was initially renamed as "Cielęcin" in 1945 and finally Sulęcin in 1946, it was repopulated mostly by Poles expelled from former eastern Poland annexed by the Soviet Union and settlers from nearby Greater Poland. From 1945 to 1975 it was the capital of its county, at first in Poznan Voivodeship (1946–1950), later Zielona Gora Voivodeship (1950–1975). It was demoted as a borough (gmina) centre in Międzyrzecz county of Gorzow Wielkopolski Voivodeship between 1975 and 1999. It has been a county center in Lubusz Voivodeship since 1999.

== Education ==
- Szkoła Podstawowa im. Polskich Olimpijczyków – Primary School Homepage
- Gimnazjum im. Jana Pawła II – Secondary School Homepage
- I Liceum Ogólnokształcące im. Adama Mickiewicza – High School Homepage
- Zespół szkół licealnych i zawodowych – High School Homepage

== Monuments ==
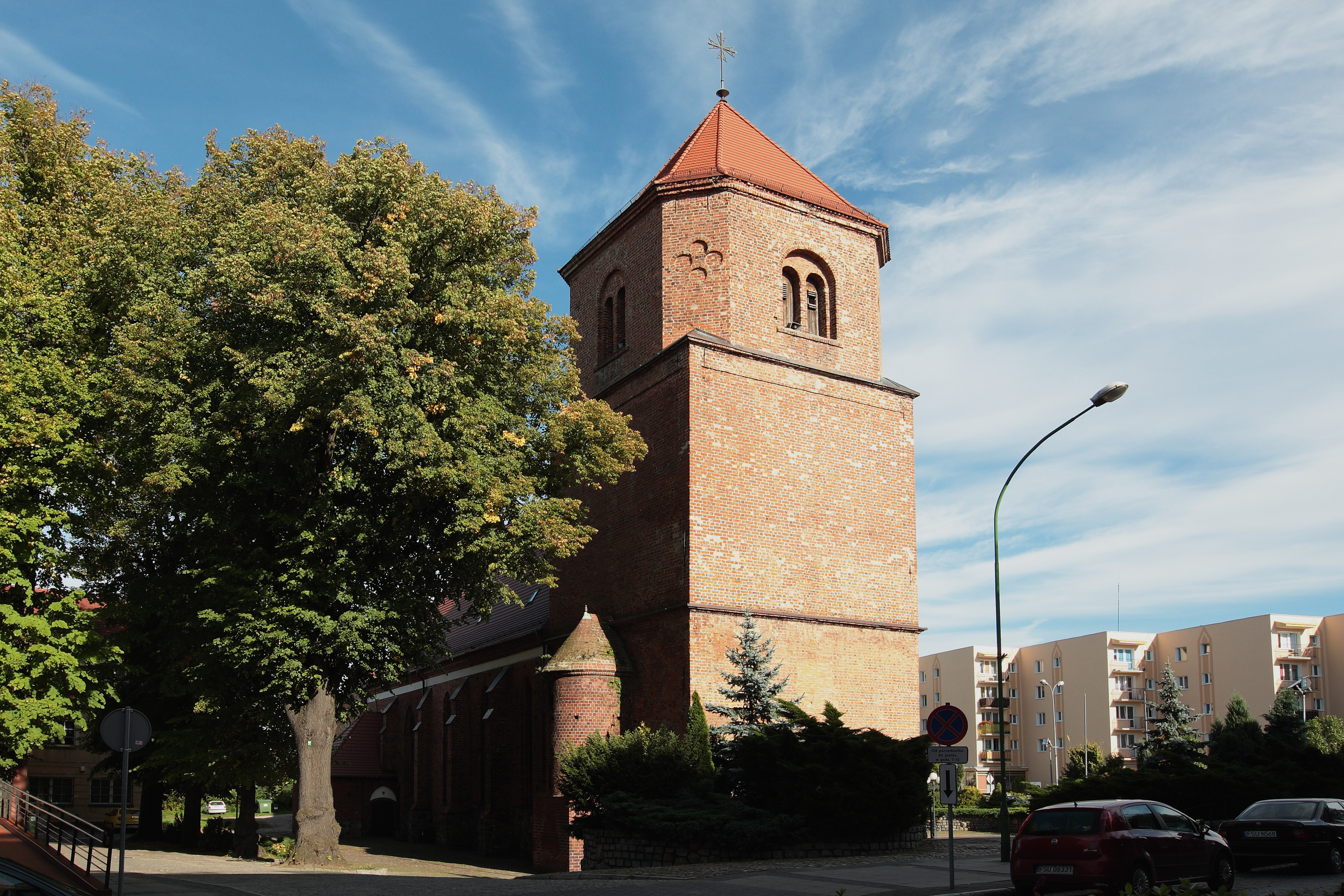
Saint Nicholas church

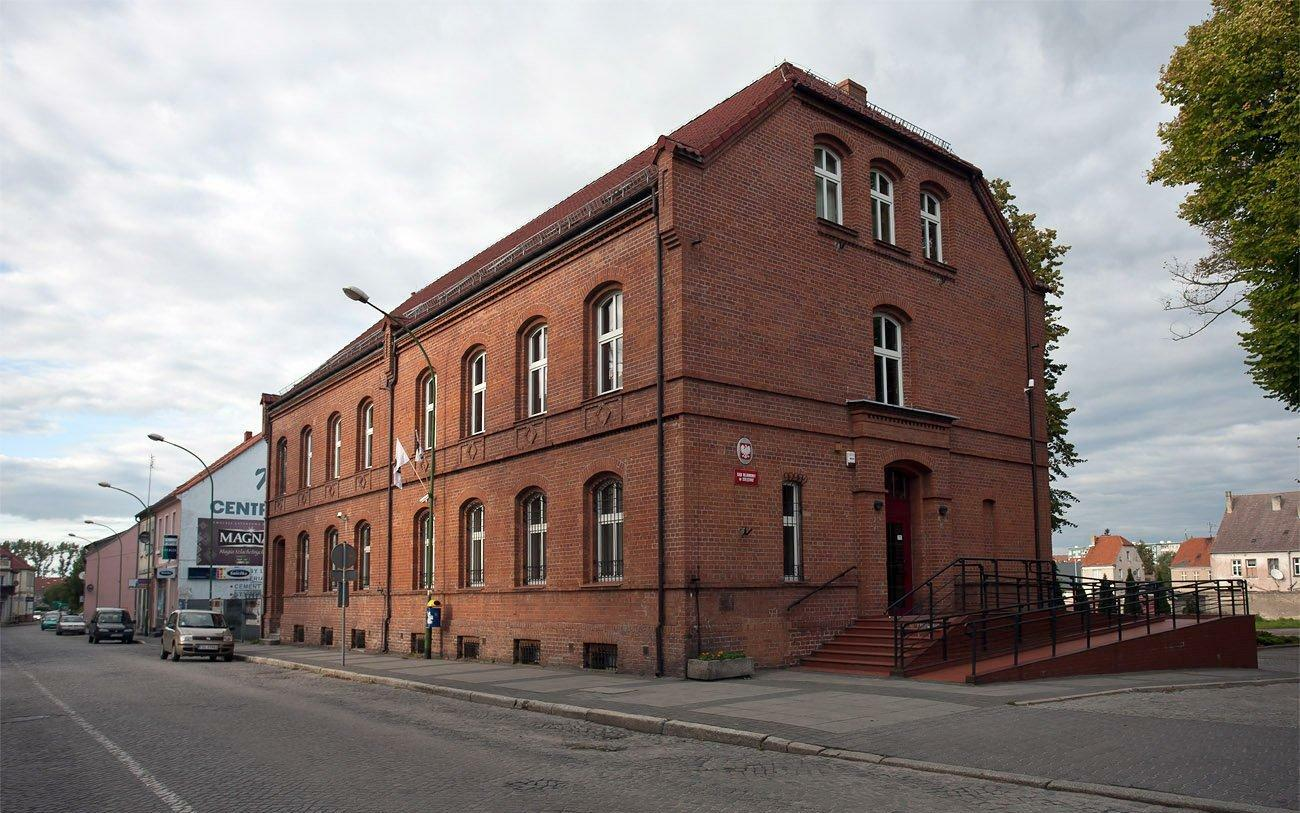
District court

- St. Nicholas church, Gothic church built by the Knights Templar, rebuilt after war damage of 1945
- Defensive walls with remains of gates and a tower
- Old town houses from 18th and 19th century

== Notable people ==
- Ernst Krause (1839–1903) German biologist
- Charlotte Zinke (1891–1944), German politician
- Siegfried Schnell (1916–1944), Luftwaffe German officer
- Ulli Lommel (1944–2017), German actor

== Twin towns – sister cities ==
See twin towns of Gmina Sulęcin.
