= Joachim Karsch =

German artist (1897–1945)

Medal record

Art competitions

Representing Germany

Olympic Games
Bronze medal – third place	1932 Los Angeles	Prints

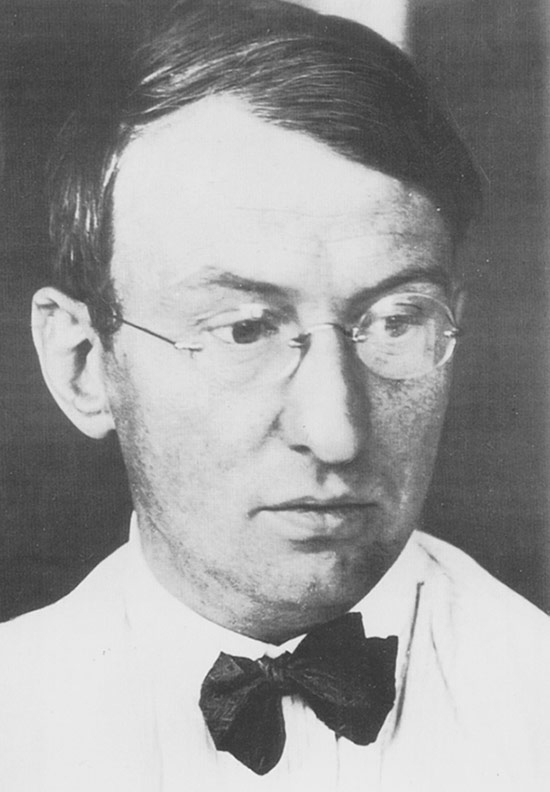
Joachim Karsch

Joachim Karsch (June 20, 1897 – February 11, 1945) was a German artist. He was born in Breslau (Wrocław) and died in Groß Gandern, Sternberg (Gądków Wielki), Gmina Torzym). In 1932, he won a bronze medal in the art competitions at the Los Angeles Games for his Stabwechsel ("Baton passing").

He committed suicide during World War II, instead of being taken to a Russian prisoner of war camp.
