= Rojek =

Rojek may refer to:

- Rojek, Sulęcin County, a settlement in the administrative district of Gmina Torzym, within Sulęcin County, Lubusz Voivodeship, in western Poland
- Rojek (surname)
- Rojek (film), a Canadian documentary film
