= Pniów =

Pniów may refer to the following places:

- Pniów, Lubusz Voivodeship (west Poland)
- Pniów, Silesian Voivodeship (south Poland)
- Pniów, Subcarpathian Voivodeship (south-east Poland)
- Pniów, West Pomeranian Voivodeship (north-west Poland)
- Pniv, village in Ivano-Frankivsk Oblast, Ukraine, which was known as Pniów when it was part of Poland.
- Pinnow, Brandenburg, village in Germany, near the border with Poland, known as Pniów in Polish.
