= Lubów =

Lubów may refer to the following places in Poland:

- Lubów, Lower Silesian Voivodeship (south-west Poland)
- Lubów, Lubusz Voivodeship (west Poland)
