= Drzewce, Lubusz Voivodeship =

Drzewce
- Village
- Location within Poland
- Coordinates: 52°14′18″N 15°6′19″E
- Country: Poland
- Voivodeship: Lubusz
- County: Sulęcin
- Gmina: Torzym
- Population: 80

Drzewce [ˈdʐɛft͡sɛ] is a village in the administrative district of Gmina Torzym, within Sulęcin County, Lubusz Voivodeship, in western Poland.
