= Tarnawa Rzepińska =

- Village
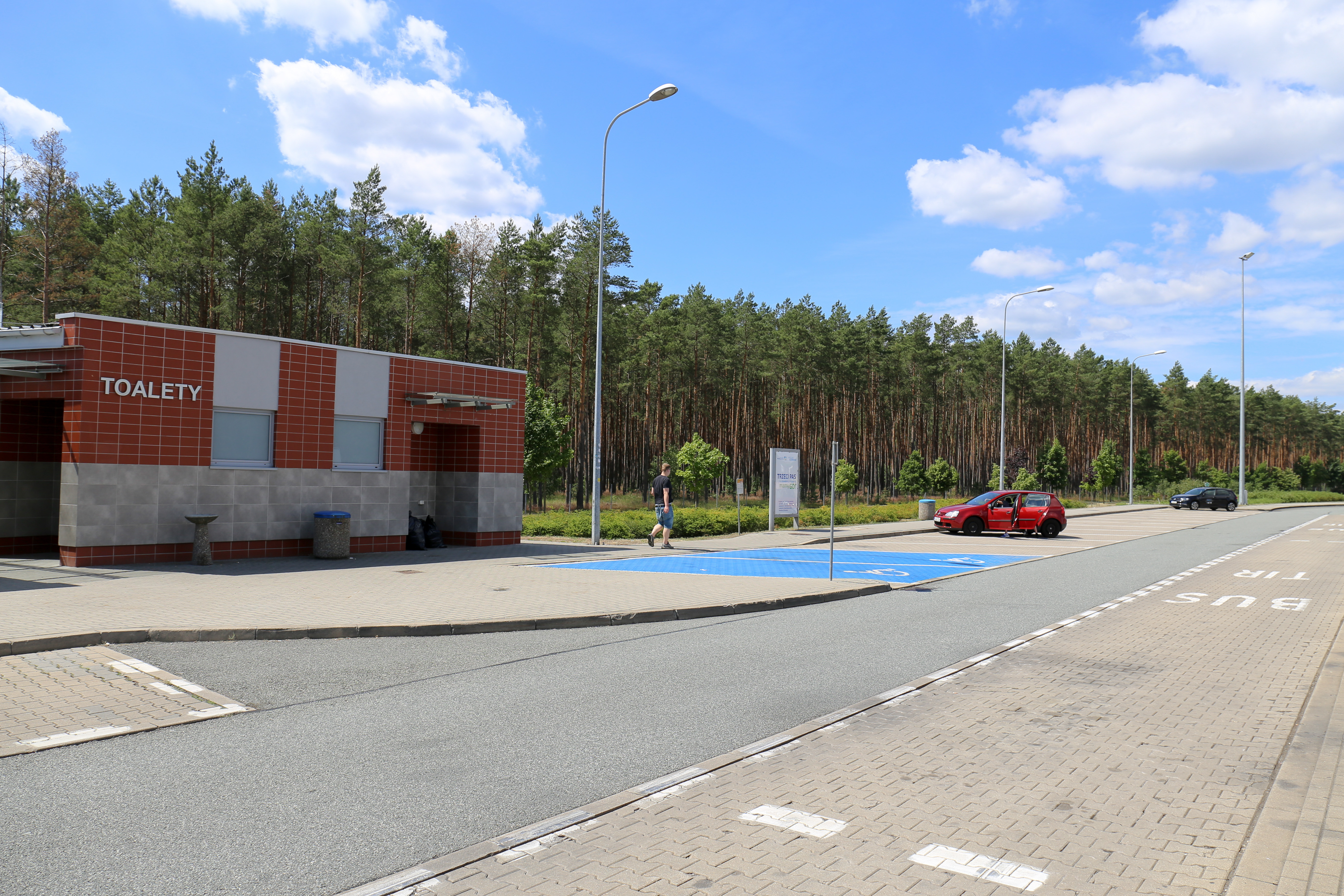

- Location within Poland
- Coordinates: 52°21′N 14°55′E
- Country: Poland
- Voivodeship: Lubusz
- County: Sulęcin
- Gmina: Torzym
- Population: 120

Tarnawa Rzepińska [tarˈnava ʐɛˈpiɲska] is a village in the administrative district of Gmina Torzym, within Sulęcin County, Lubusz Voivodeship, in western Poland.

== Gallery ==
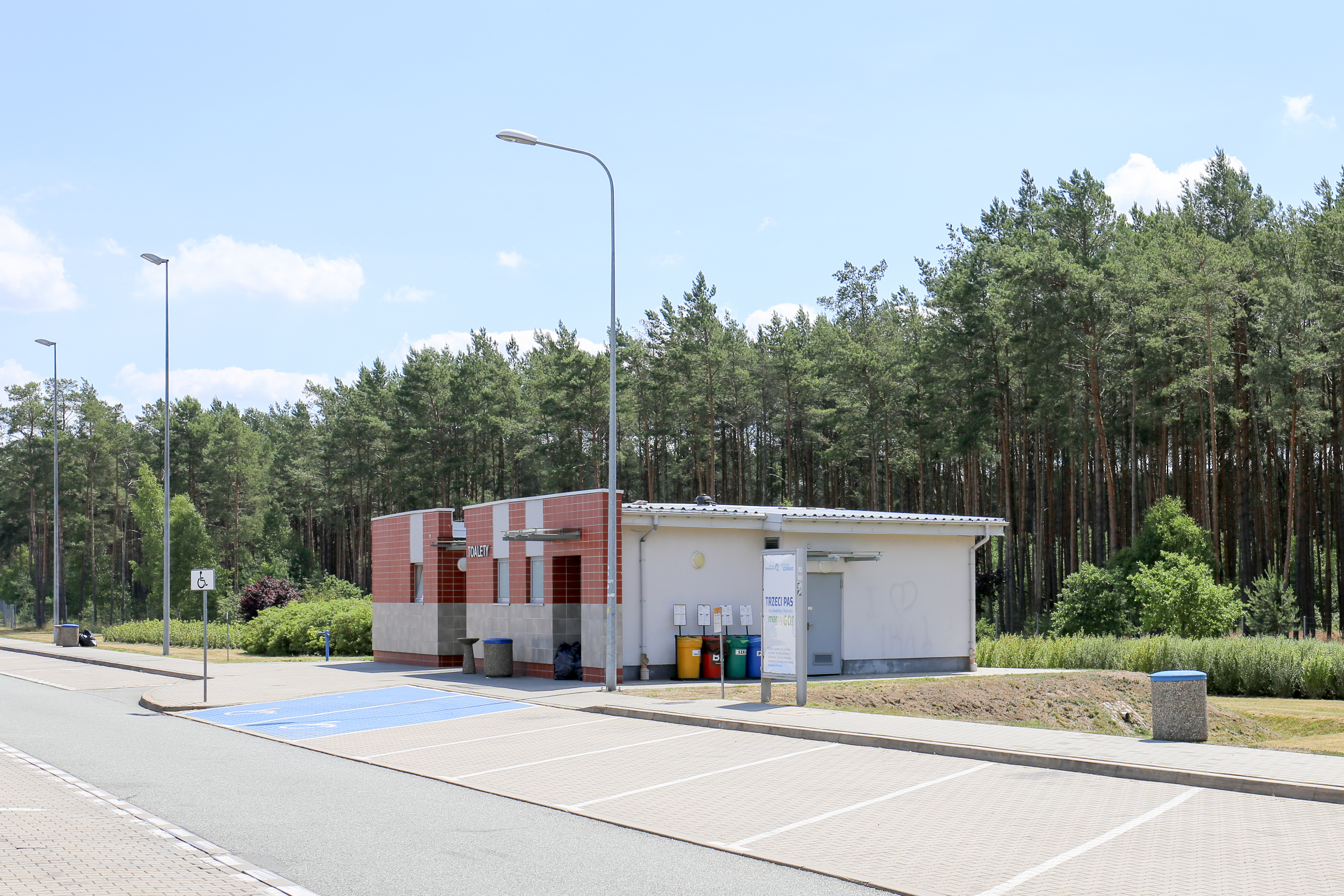

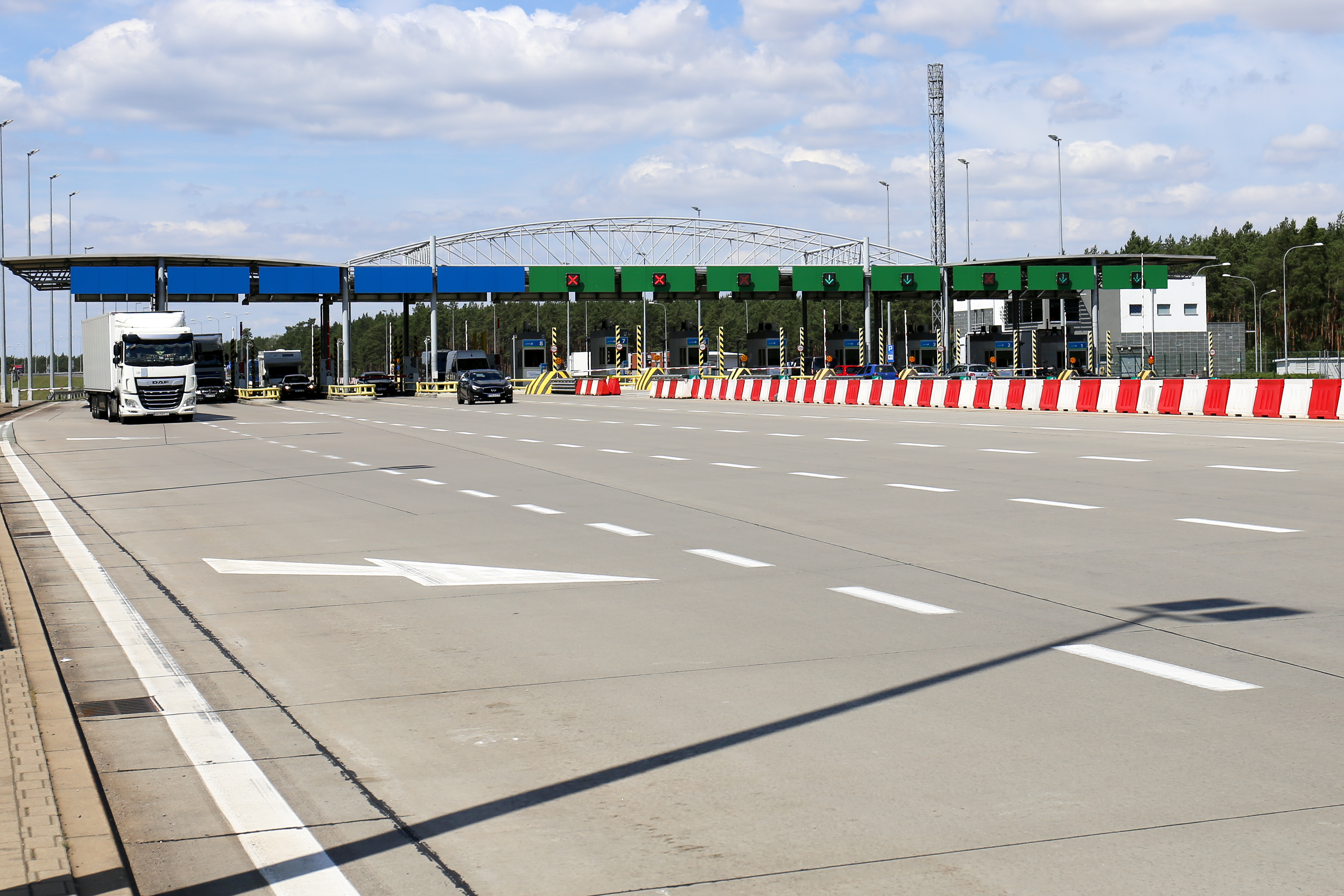

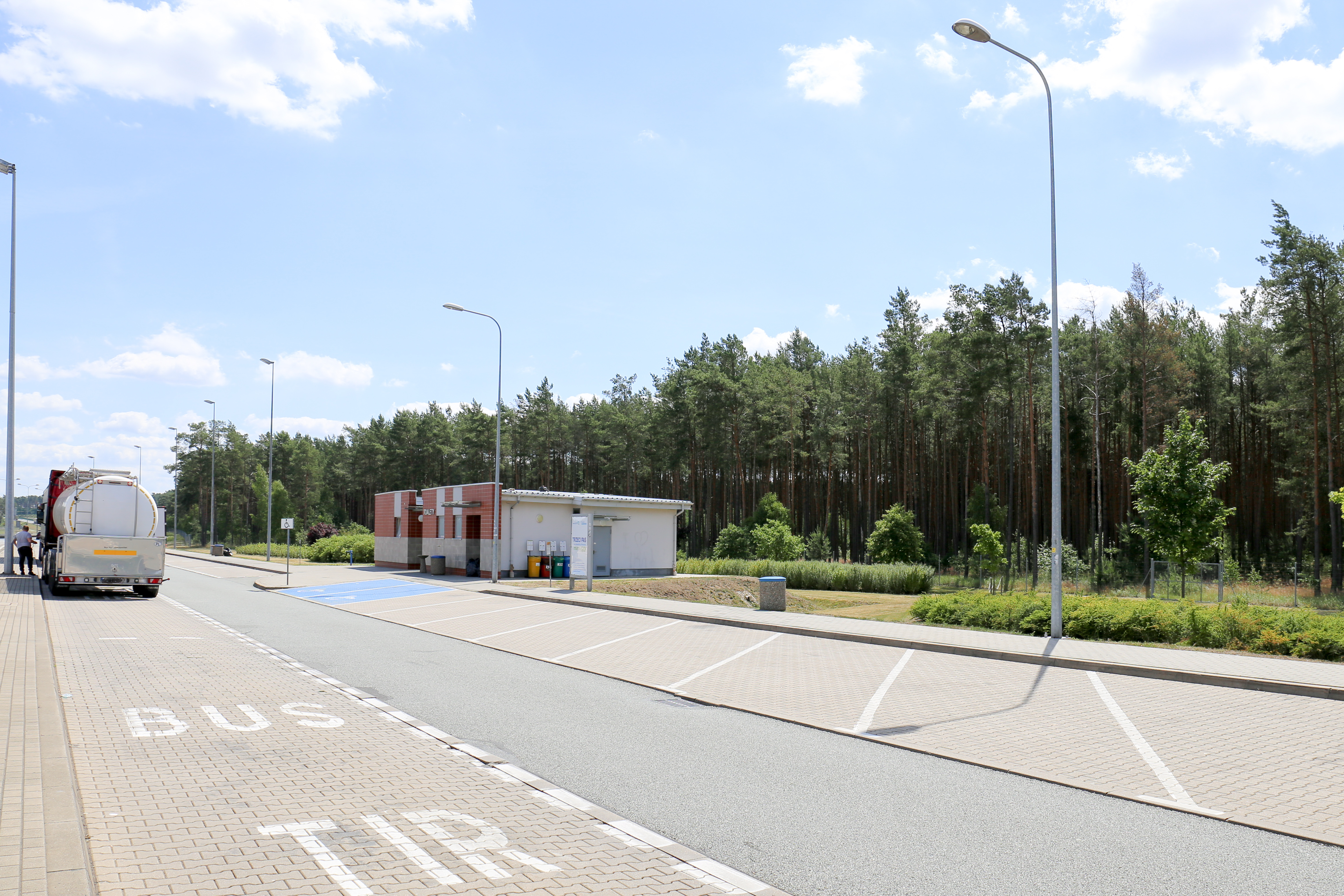

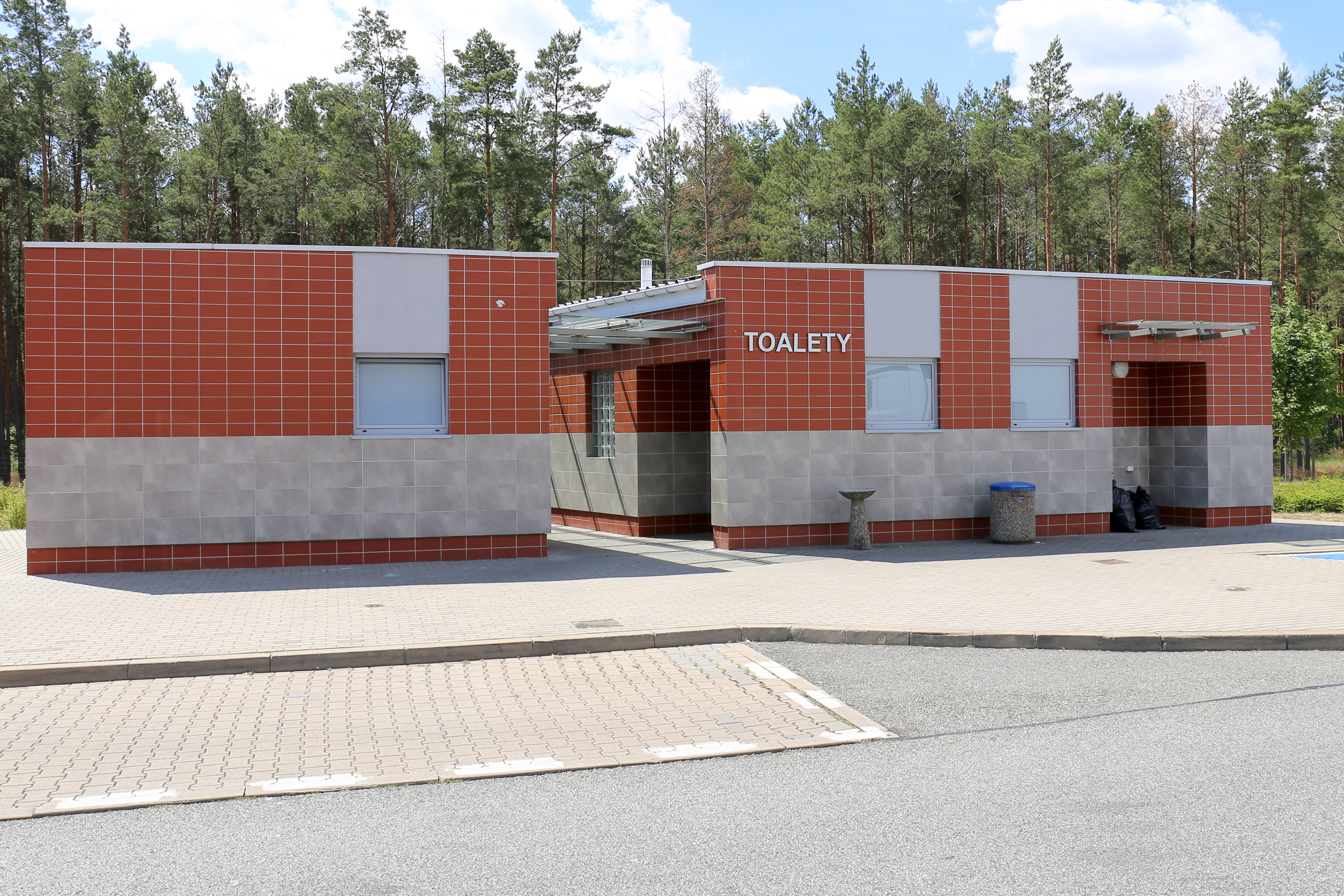

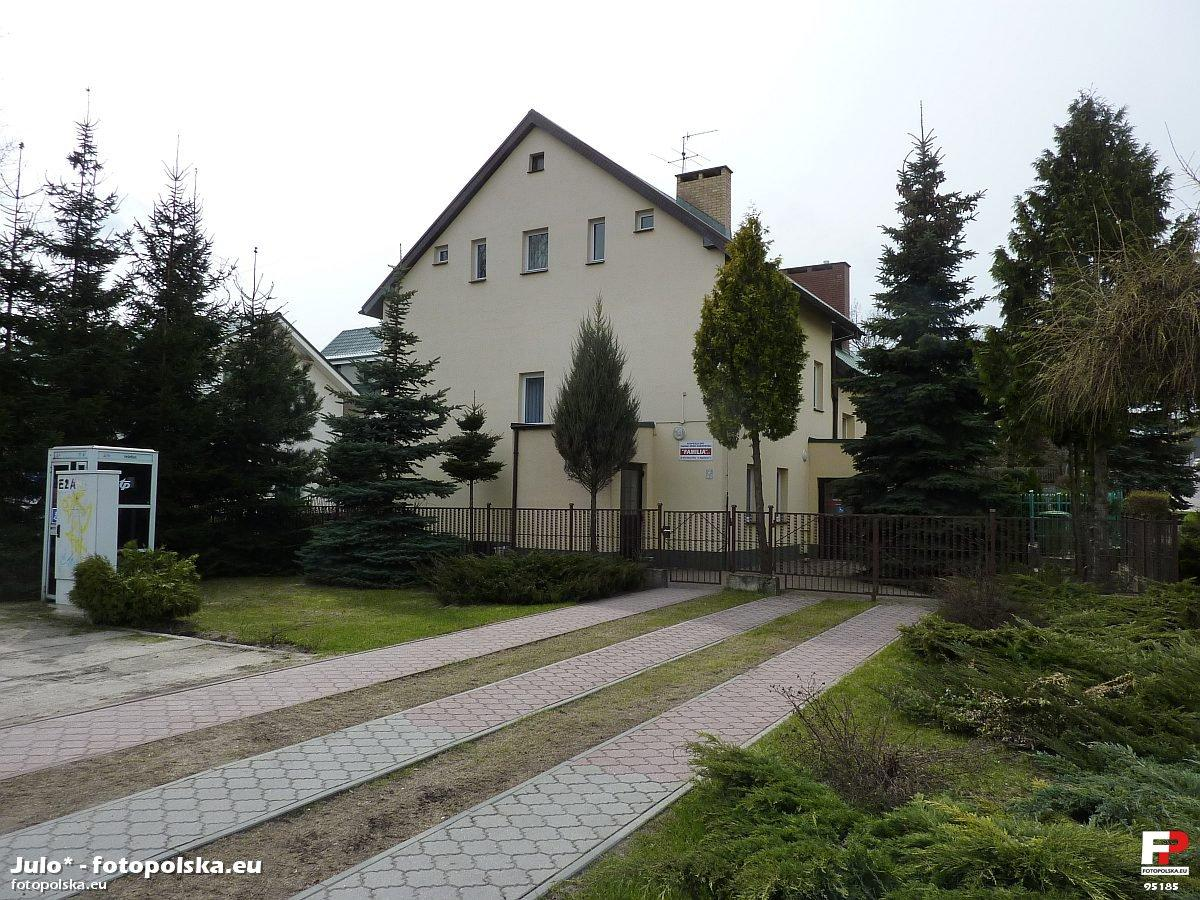

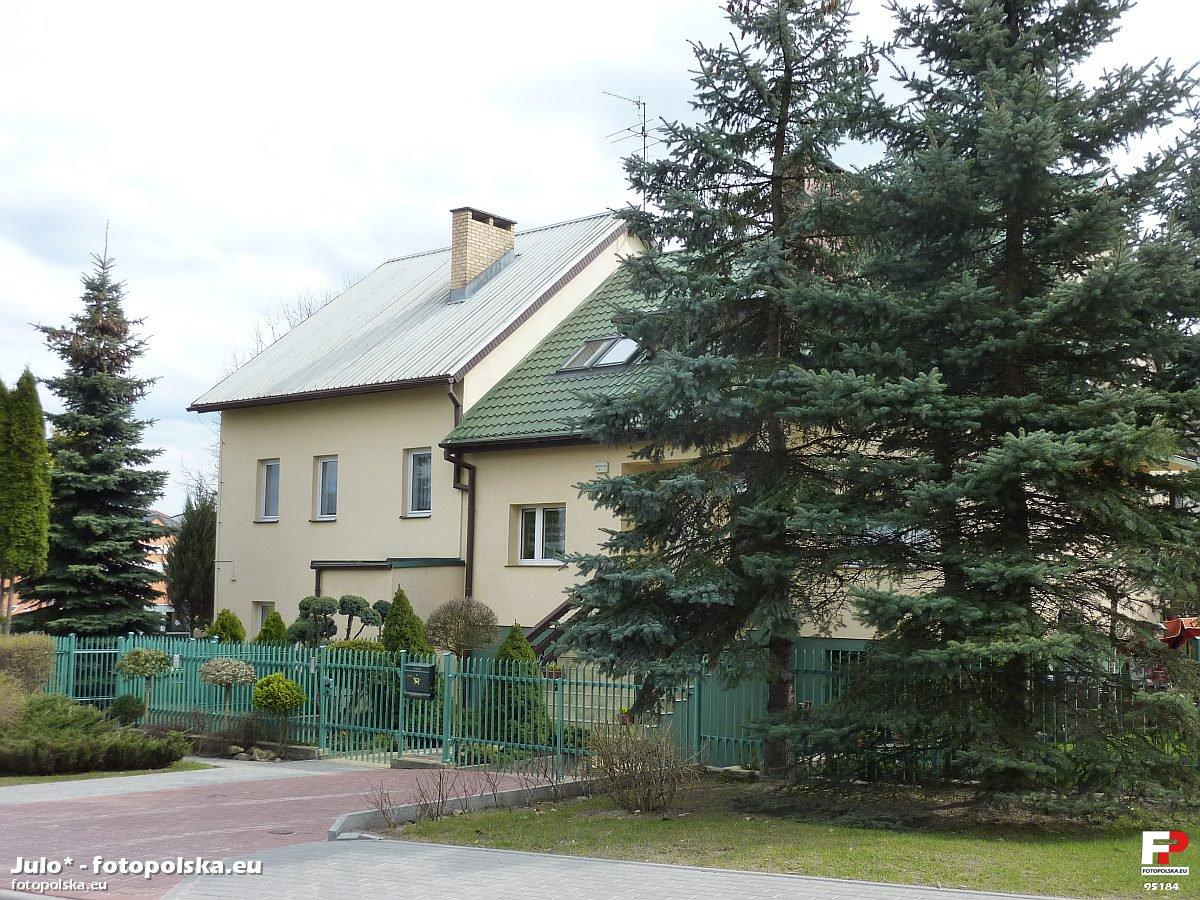

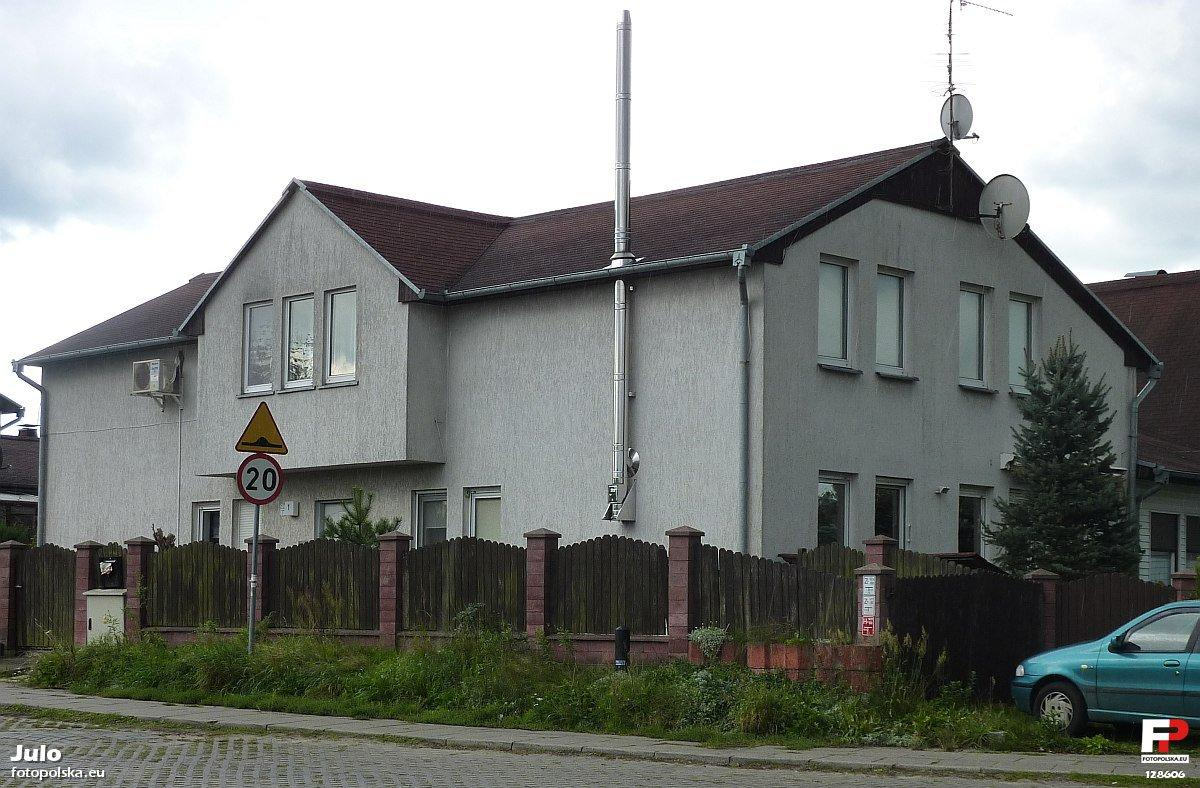

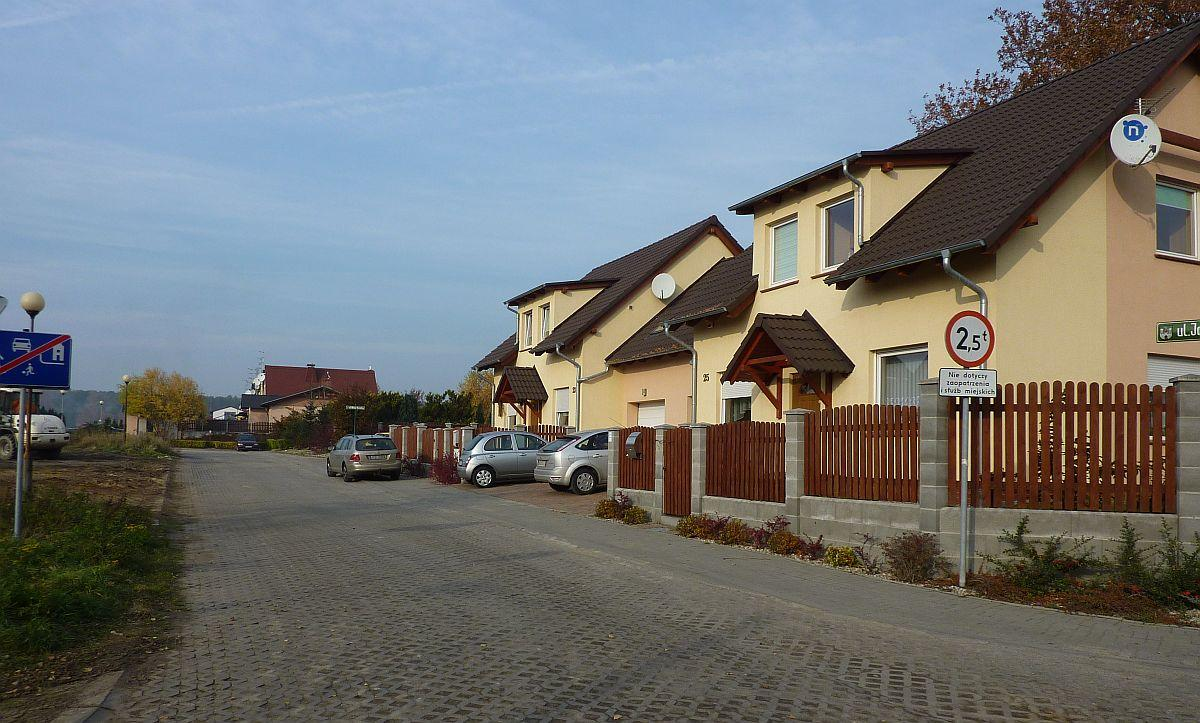

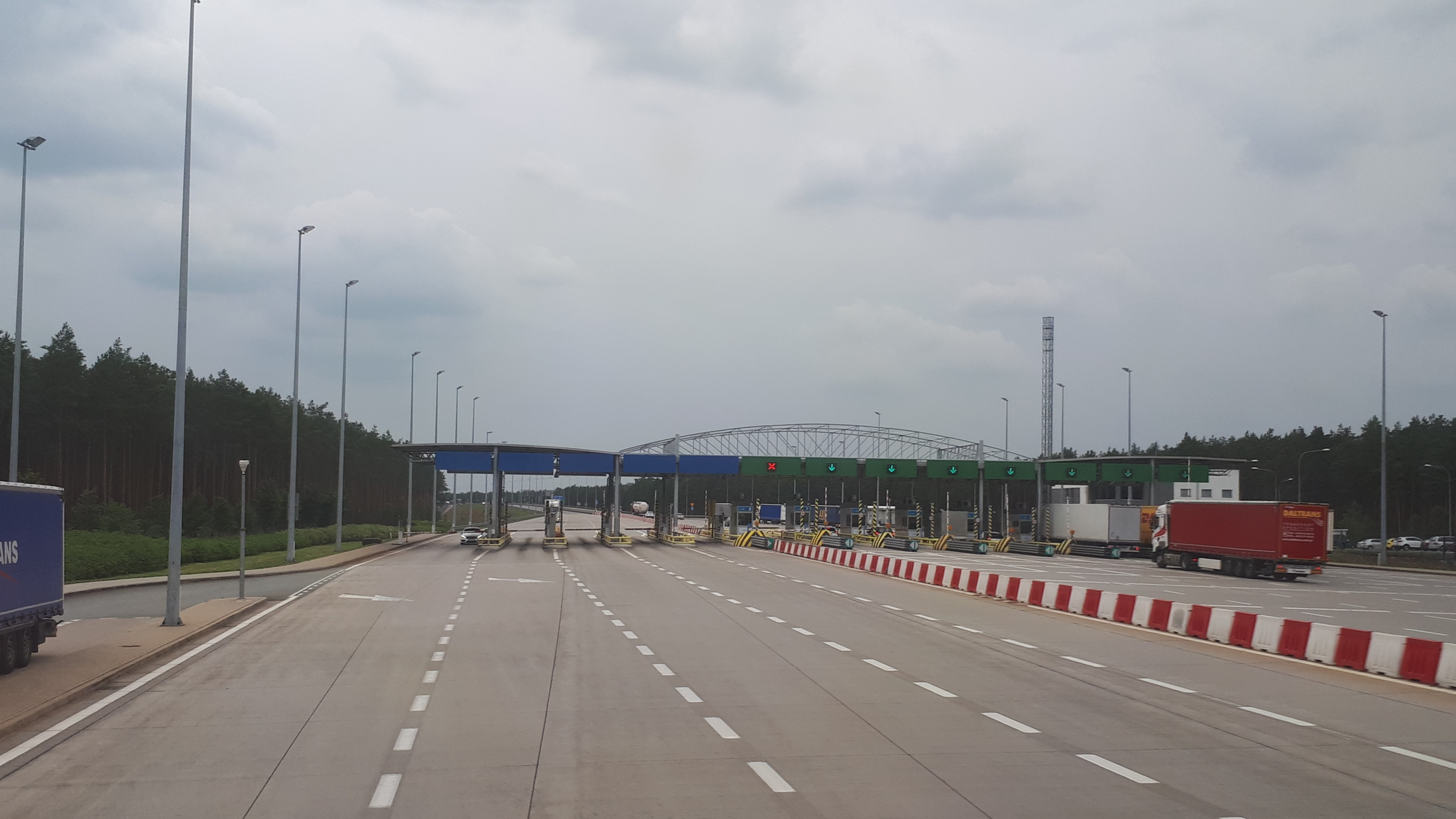

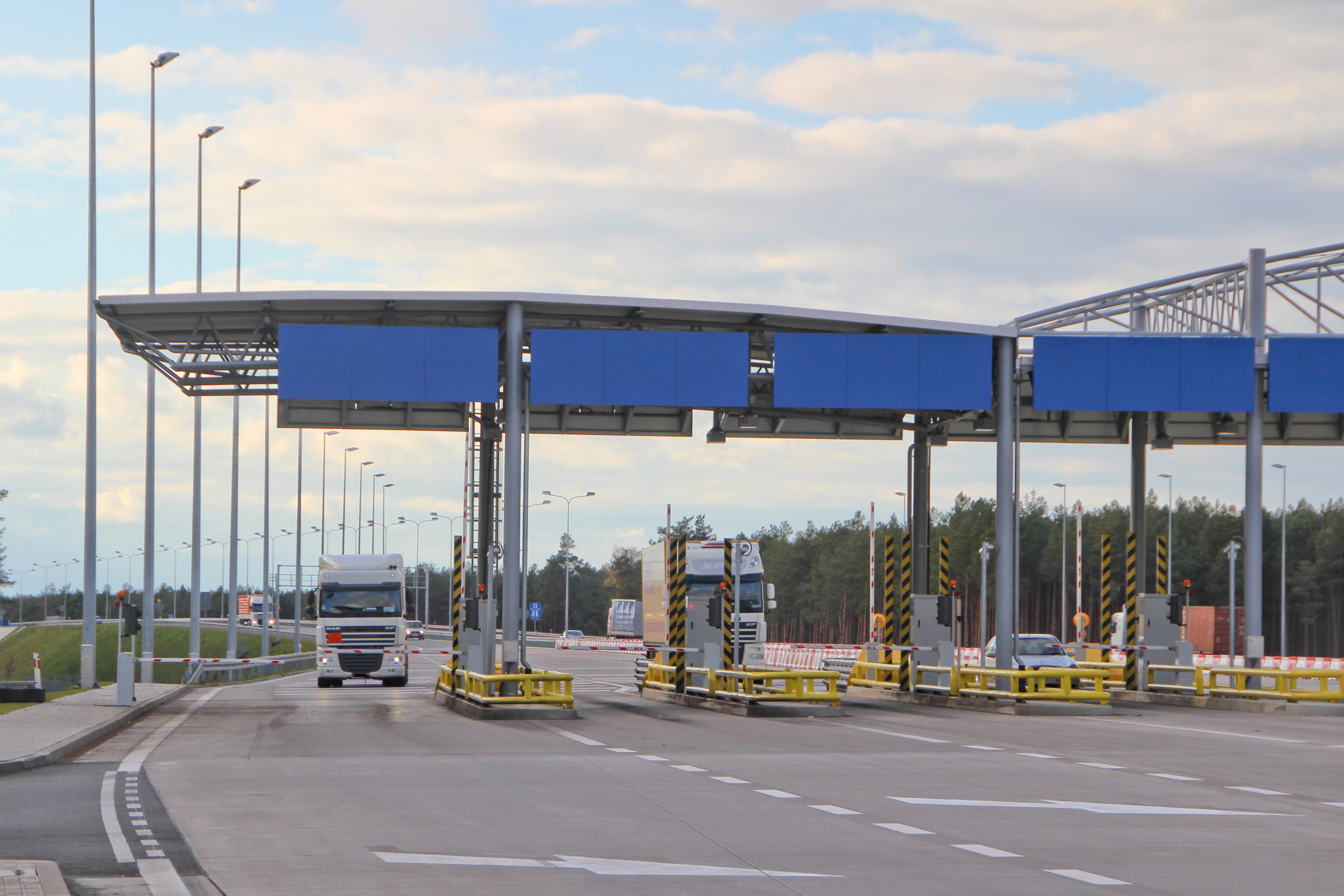

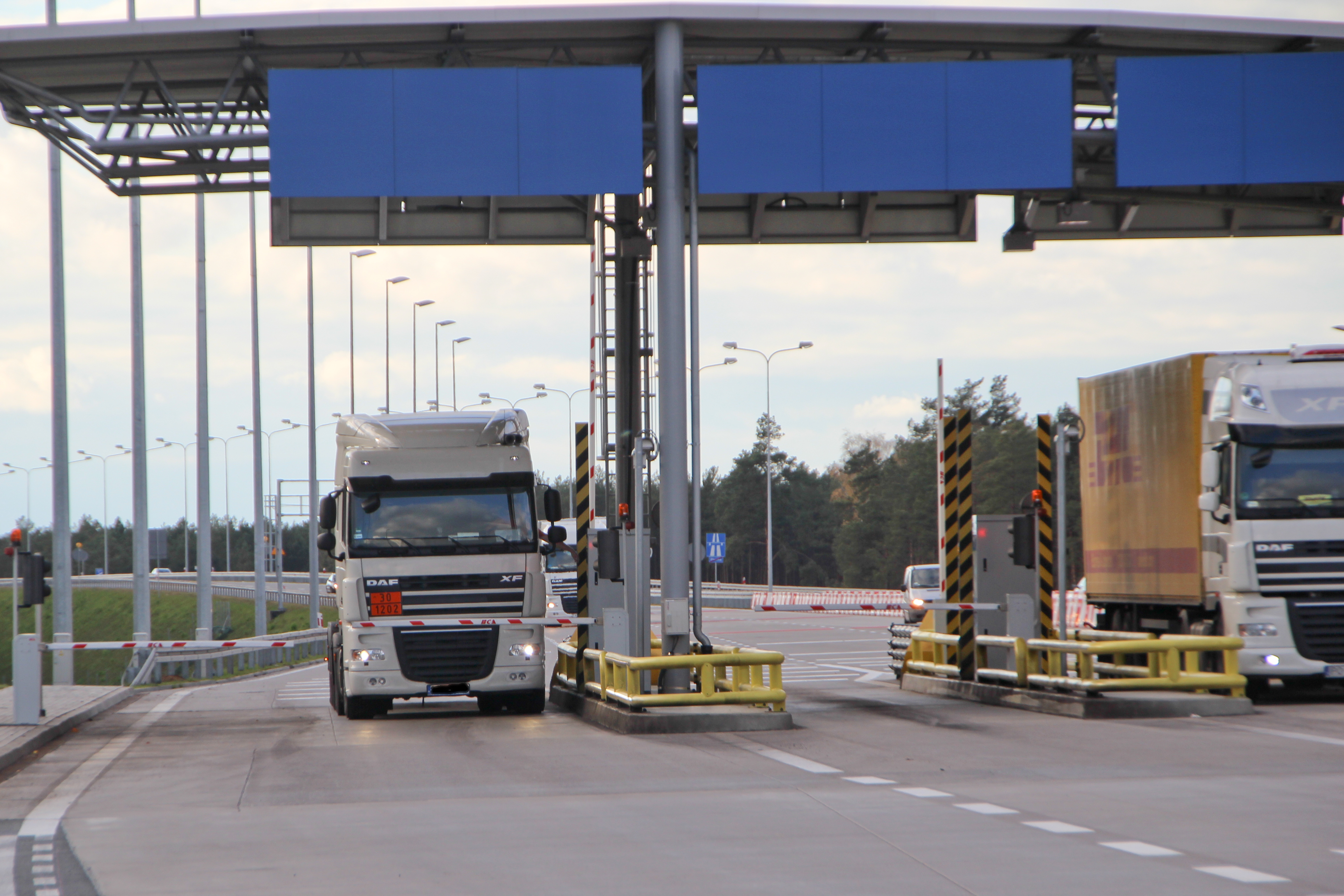

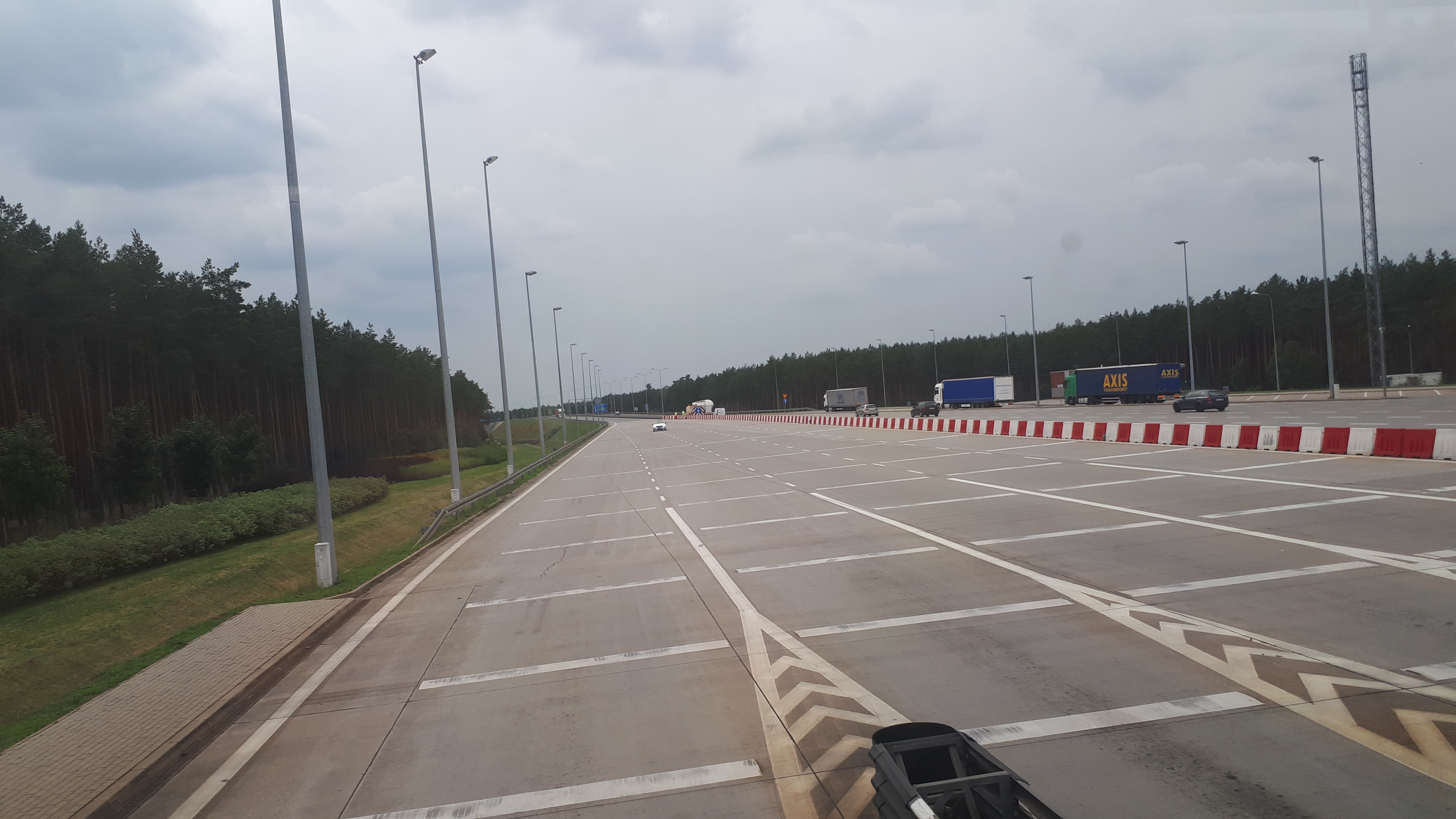
