= Gądków Mały =

- Village
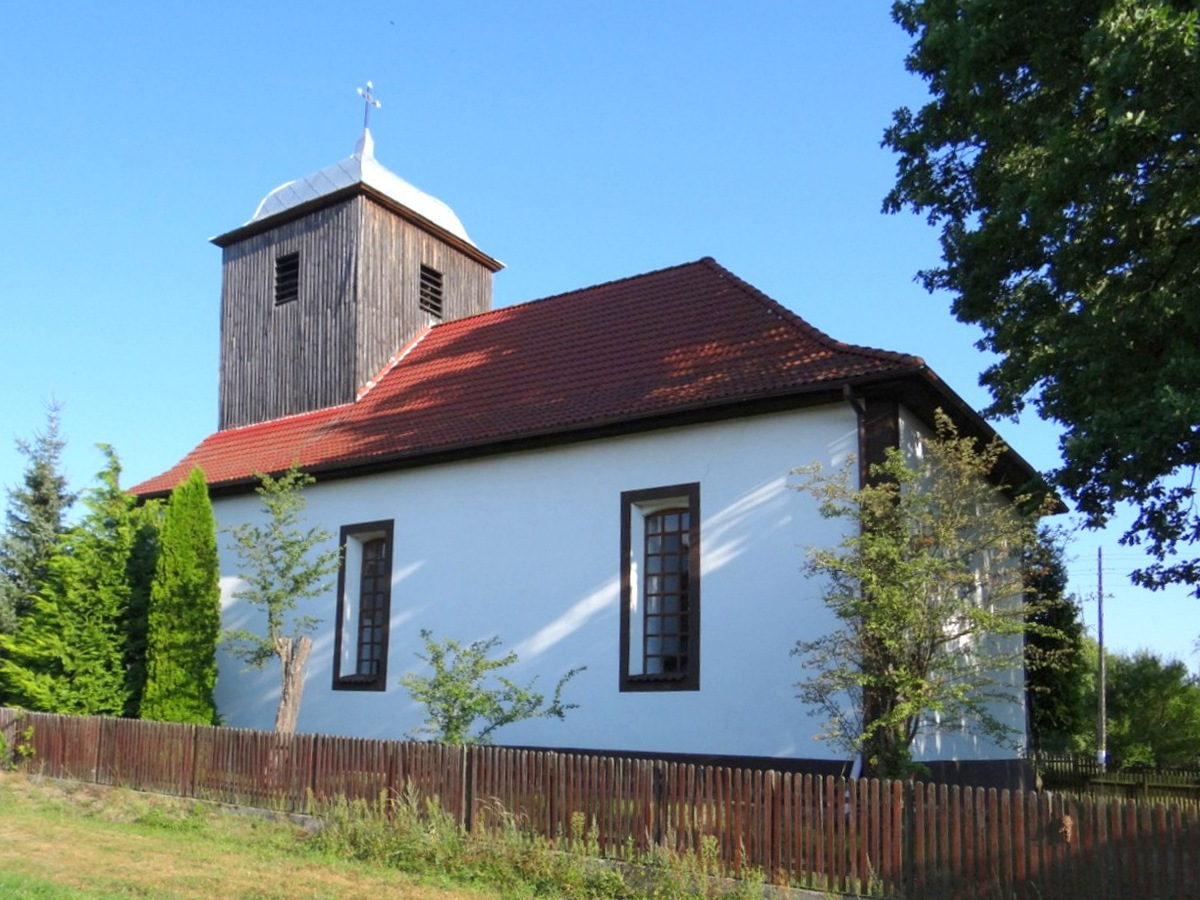
- Catholic church

- Location within Poland
- Coordinates: 52°15′20″N 14°57′4″E
- Country: Poland
- Voivodeship: Lubusz
- County: Sulęcin
- Gmina: Torzym
- Population: 109

Gądków Mały [ˈɡɔntkuf ˈmawɨ] is a village in the administrative district of Gmina Torzym, within Sulęcin County, Lubusz Voivodeship, in western Poland.
