= Wystok =

- Village
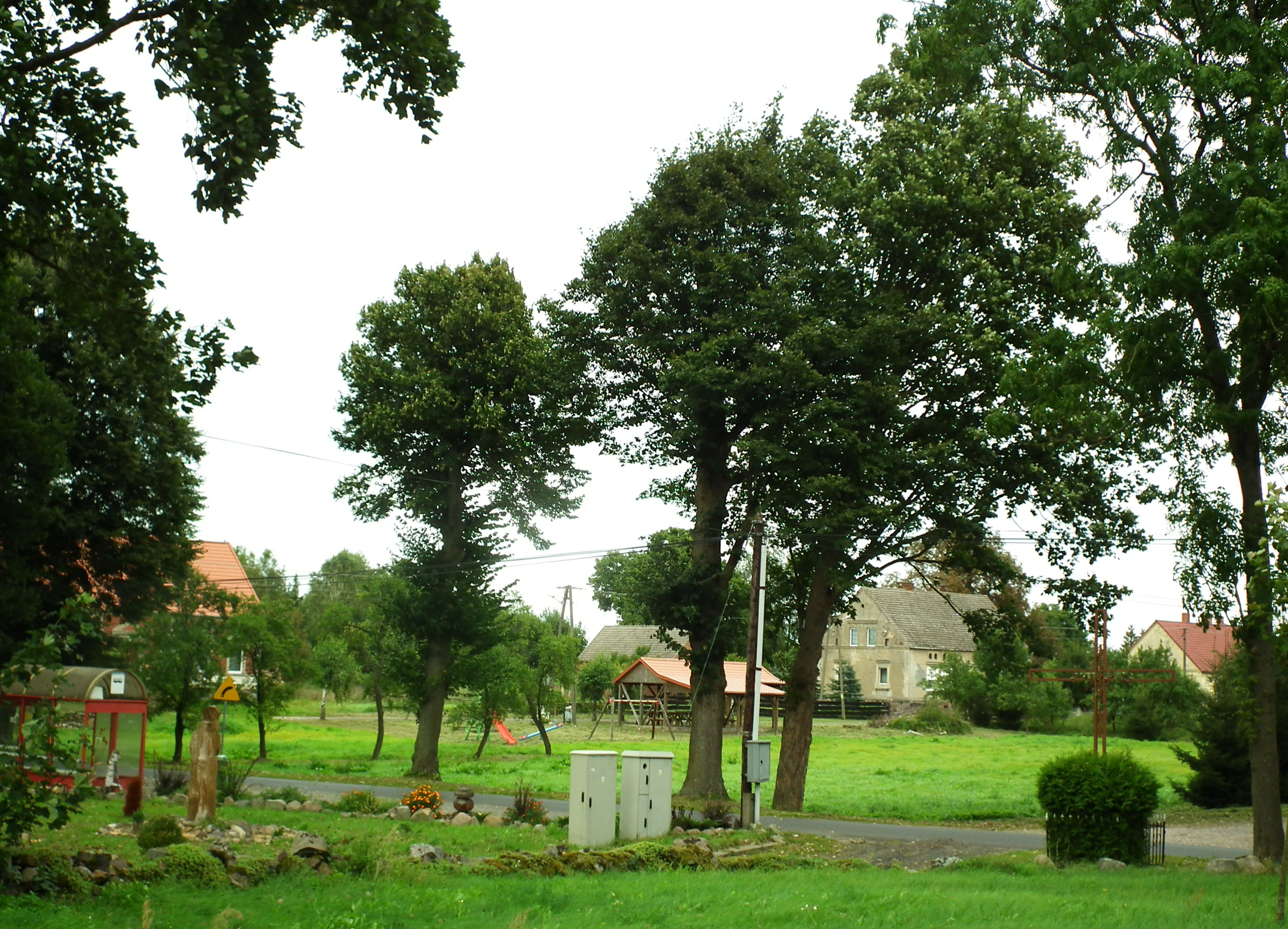

- Location within Poland
- Coordinates: 52°22′N 14°56′E
- Country: Poland
- Voivodeship: Lubusz
- County: Sulęcin
- Gmina: Torzym

Wystok [ˈvɨstɔk] is a village in the administrative district of Gmina Torzym, within Sulęcin County, Lubusz Voivodeship, in western Poland.
