= Jelenie Pole =

- Settlement
- Location within Poland
- Coordinates: 52°16′10″N 15°08′51″E
- Country: Poland
- Voivodeship: Lubusz
- County: Sulęcin
- Gmina: Torzym

Jelenie Pole [jɛˈlɛɲɛ ˈpɔlɛ] is a settlement in the administrative district of Gmina Torzym, within Sulęcin County, Lubusz Voivodeship, in western Poland.
