= Bobrówko, Sulęcin County =

Bobrówko
- Village
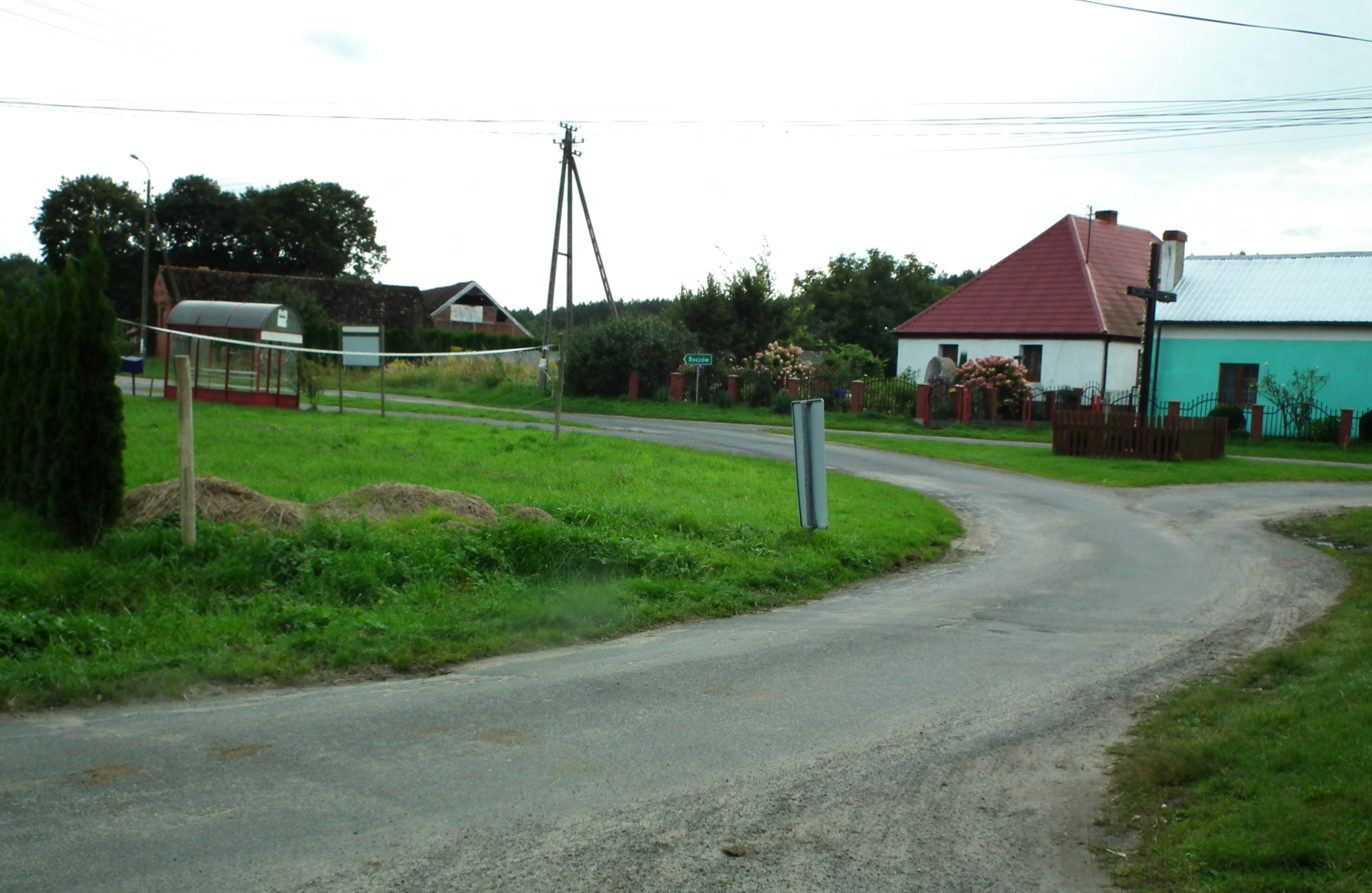

- Location within Poland
- Coordinates: 52°22′N 15°0′E
- Country: Poland
- Voivodeship: Lubusz
- County: Sulęcin
- Gmina: Torzym

Bobrówko [bɔˈbrufkɔ] is a village in the administrative district of Gmina Torzym, within Sulęcin County, Lubusz Voivodeship, in western Poland.
