= Garbicz =

- Village
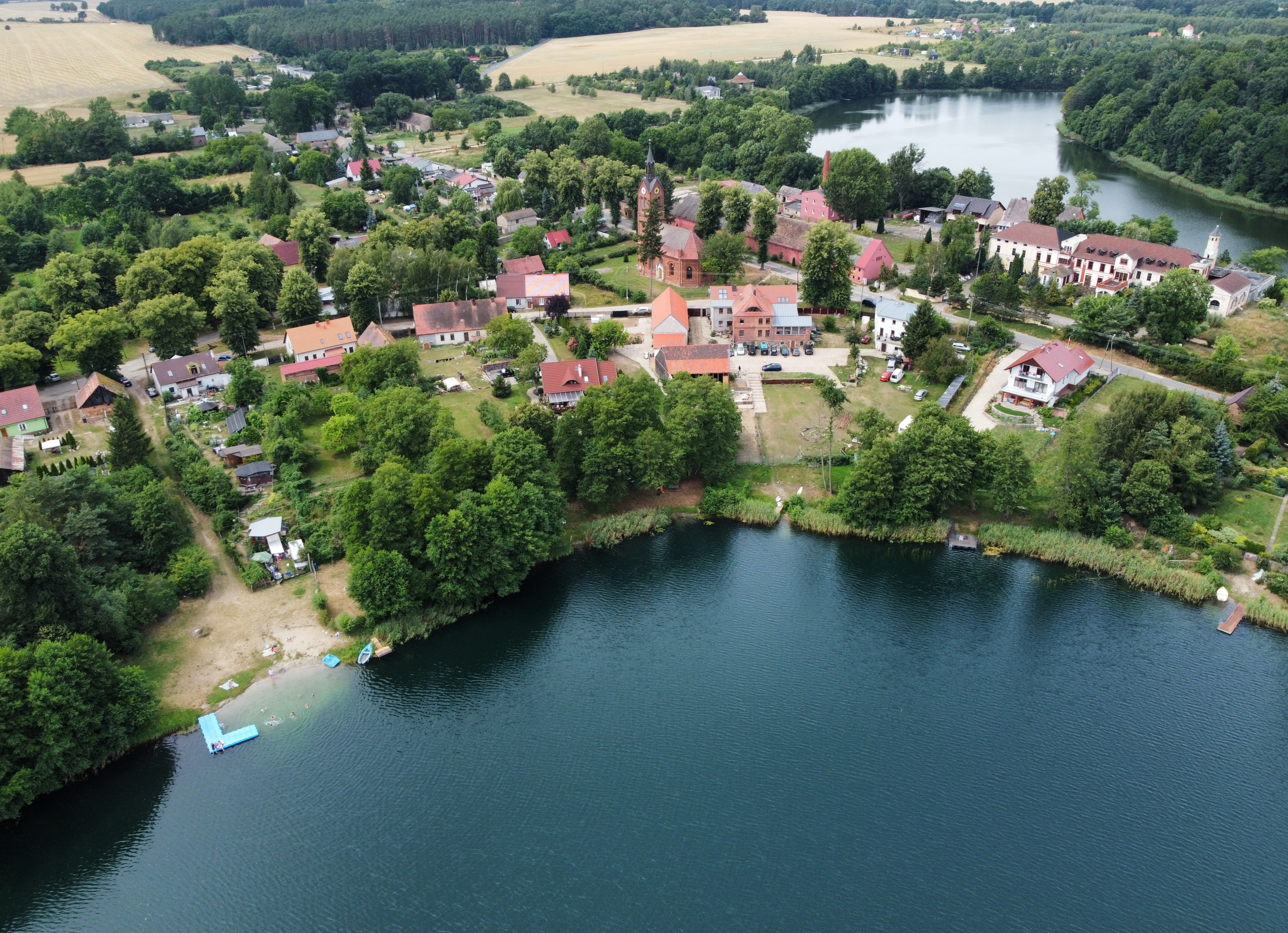

- Location within Poland
- Coordinates: 52°19′N 14°59′E
- Country: Poland
- Voivodeship: Lubusz
- County: Sulęcin
- Gmina: Torzym
- Population: 312

Garbicz Polish pronunciation: [ˈɡarbit͡ʂ] (historically German: Görbitsch) is a village in Gmina Torzym, within Sulęcin County, Lubusz Voivodeship, in western Poland. It is situated on Lake Wielkie, and the history of the settlement dates to the 14th century. The village contains a neo-Gothic church built in 1855 and an 18th-century manor with a historic landscape park.

Garbicz gives its name to the Garbicz Festival, an electronic music festival held at a lakeside site near the village.
