= Drzewce-Kolonia, Lubusz Voivodeship =

Drzewce-Kolonia
- Village
- Location within Poland
- Coordinates: 52°16′23″N 15°8′38″E
- Country: Poland
- Voivodeship: Lubusz
- County: Sulęcin
- Gmina: Torzym
- Population: 170

Drzewce-Kolonia [ˈdʐɛft͡sɛ kɔˈlɔɲa] is a village in the administrative district of Gmina Torzym, within Sulęcin County, Lubusz Voivodeship, in western Poland.
