= Boczów, Lubusz Voivodeship =

Boczów
- Village
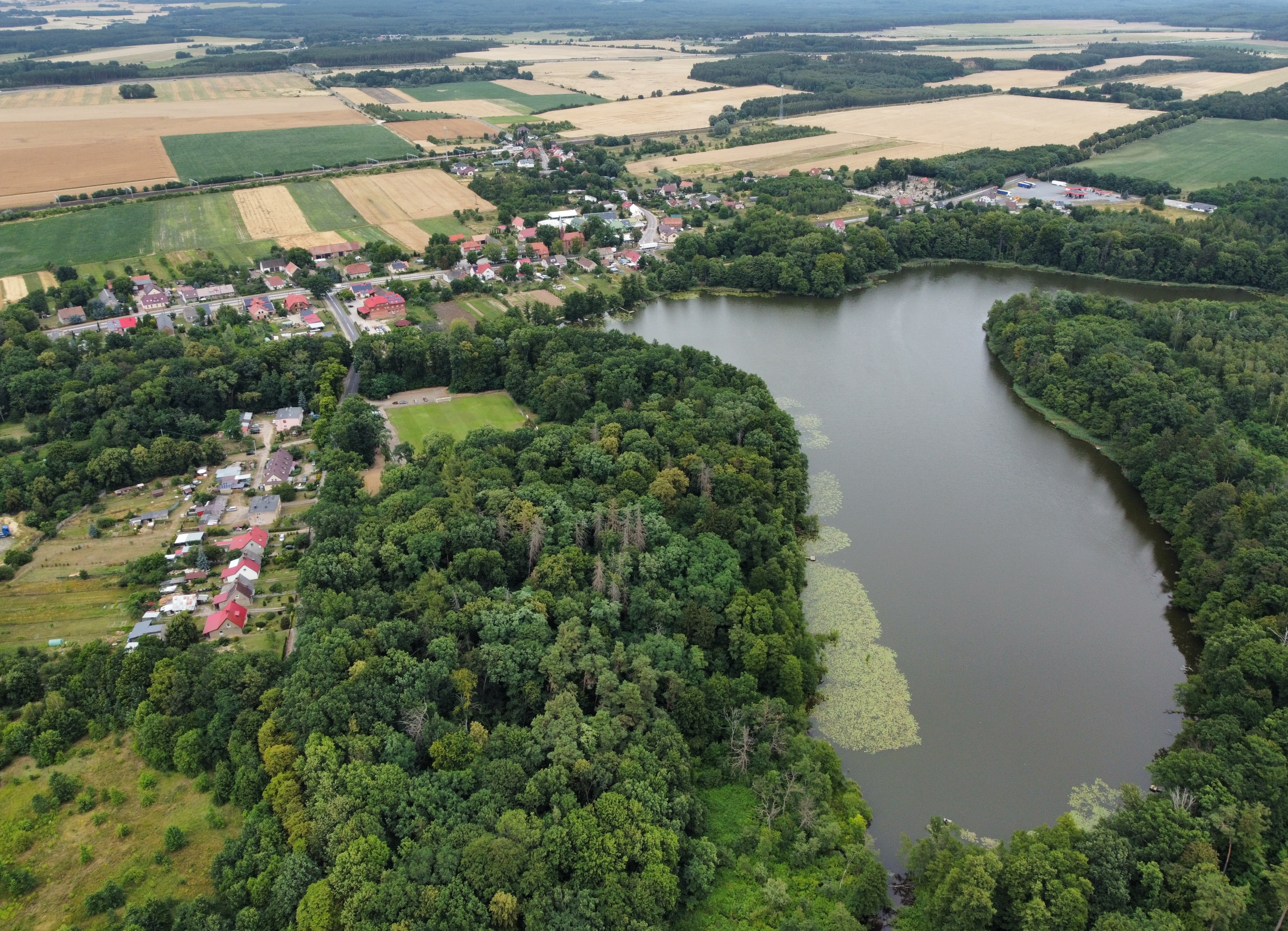

- Location within Poland
- Coordinates: 52°19′24″N 14°56′51″E
- Country: Poland
- Voivodeship: Lubusz
- County: Sulęcin
- Gmina: Torzym
- Population: 700

Boczów [ˈbɔt͡ʂuf] is a village in the administrative district of Gmina Torzym, within Sulęcin County, Lubusz Voivodeship, in western Poland.
