= Grabów, Sulęcin County =

Grabów
- Village
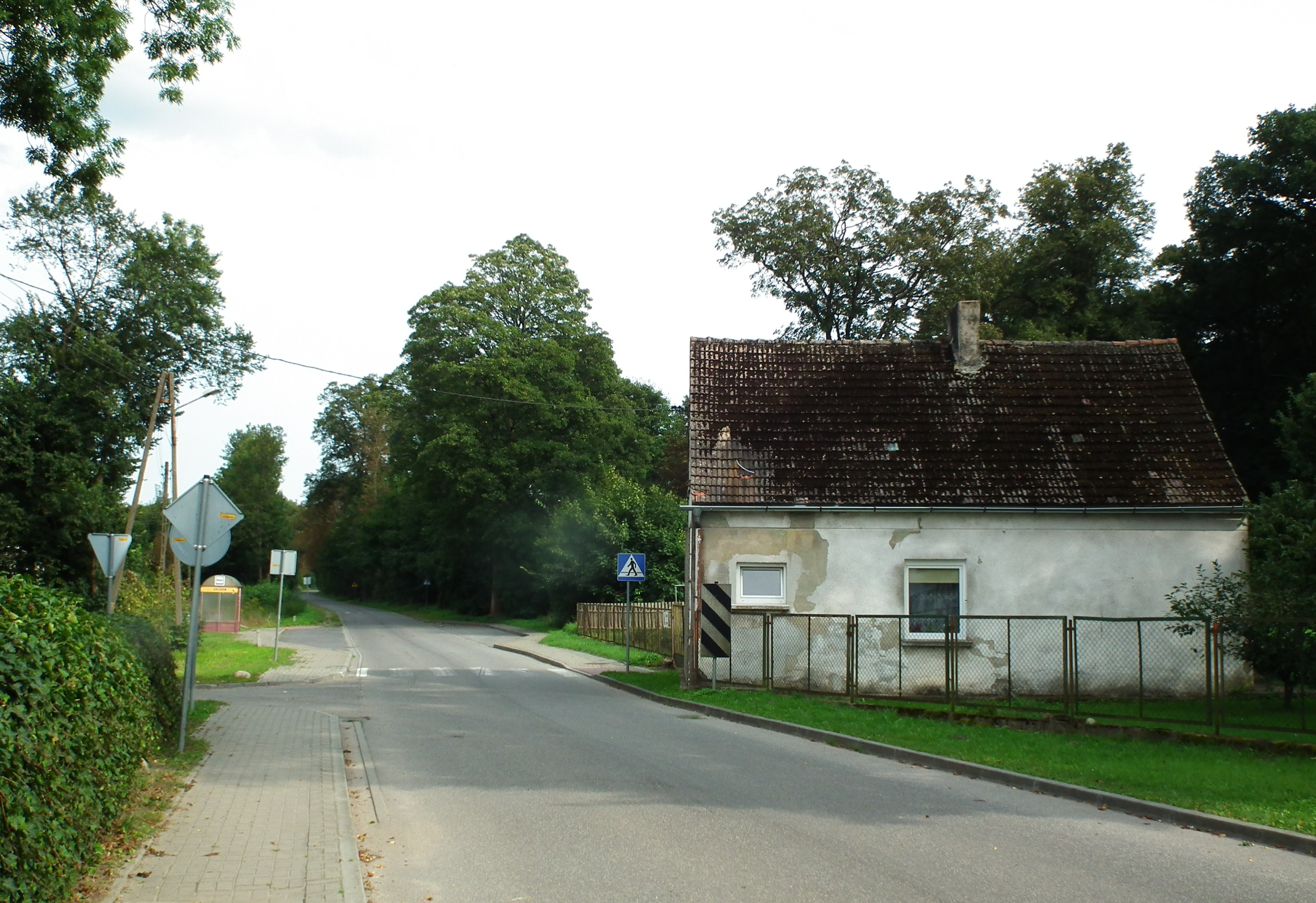

- Location within Poland
- Coordinates: 52°21′N 15°8′E
- Country: Poland
- Voivodeship: Lubusz
- County: Sulęcin
- Gmina: Torzym
- Postal code: 66-235
- Vehicle registration: FSU

Grabów [ˈɡrabuf] is a village in the administrative district of Gmina Torzym, within Sulęcin County, Lubusz Voivodeship, in western Poland.
