= Bargów =

- Village
- Location within Poland
- Coordinates: 52°15′N 14°55′E
- Country: Poland
- Voivodeship: Lubusz
- County: Sulęcin
- Gmina: Torzym

Bargów [ˈbarɡuf] is a village in the administrative district of Gmina Torzym, within Sulęcin County, Lubusz Voivodeship, in western Poland.
