= Lubin, Lubusz Voivodeship =

Lubin
- Village
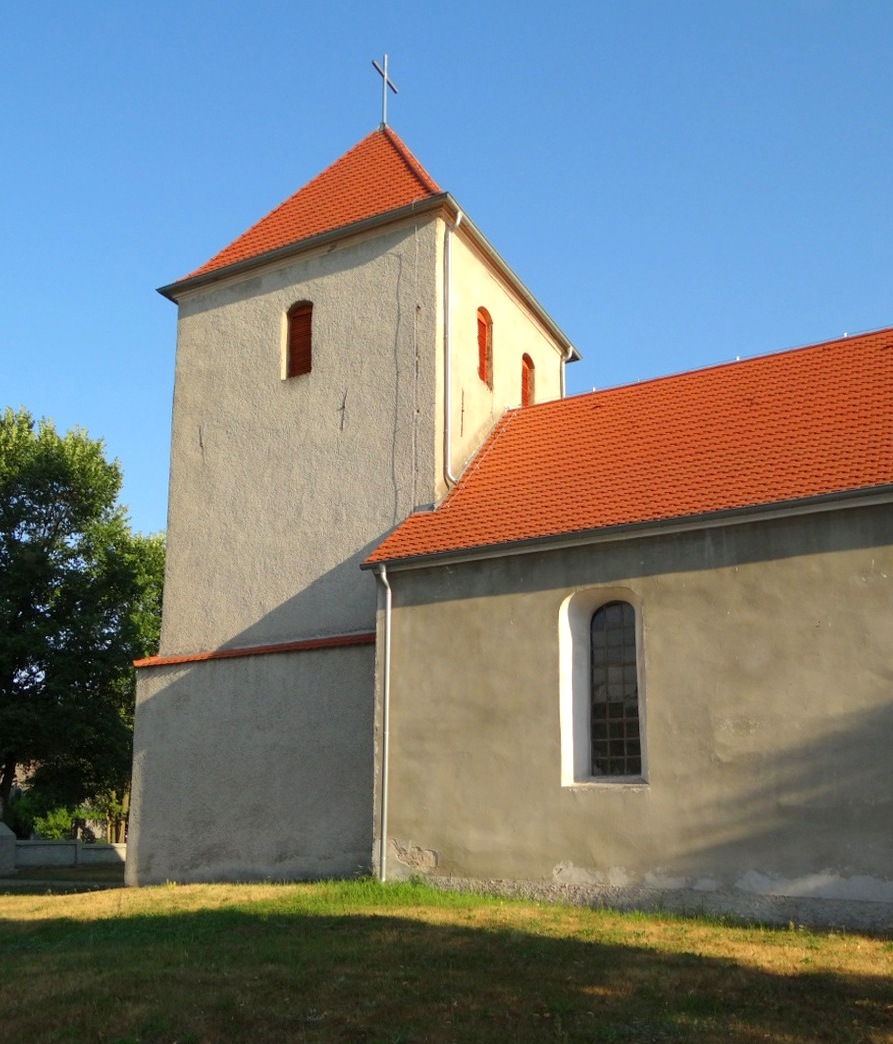
- Corpus Christi church in Lubin

- Location within Poland
- Coordinates: 52°17′47″N 14°54′29″E
- Country: Poland
- Voivodeship: Lubusz
- County: Sulęcin
- Gmina: Torzym
- Time zone: UTC+1 (CET)
  - Summer (DST): UTC+2 (CEST)
- Vehicle registration: FSU

Lubin (Polish: [ˈlubin]) is a village in the administrative district of Gmina Torzym, within Sulęcin County, Lubusz Voivodeship, in western Poland.
