= Rożnówka =

- Settlement
- Location within Poland
- Coordinates: 52°19′12″N 15°6′58″E
- Country: Poland
- Voivodeship: Lubusz
- County: Sulęcin
- Gmina: Torzym

Rożnówka [rɔʐˈnufka] is a settlement in the administrative district of Gmina Torzym, within Sulęcin County, Lubusz Voivodeship, in western Poland.
