= Kownaty, Lubusz Voivodeship =

Kownaty
- Village
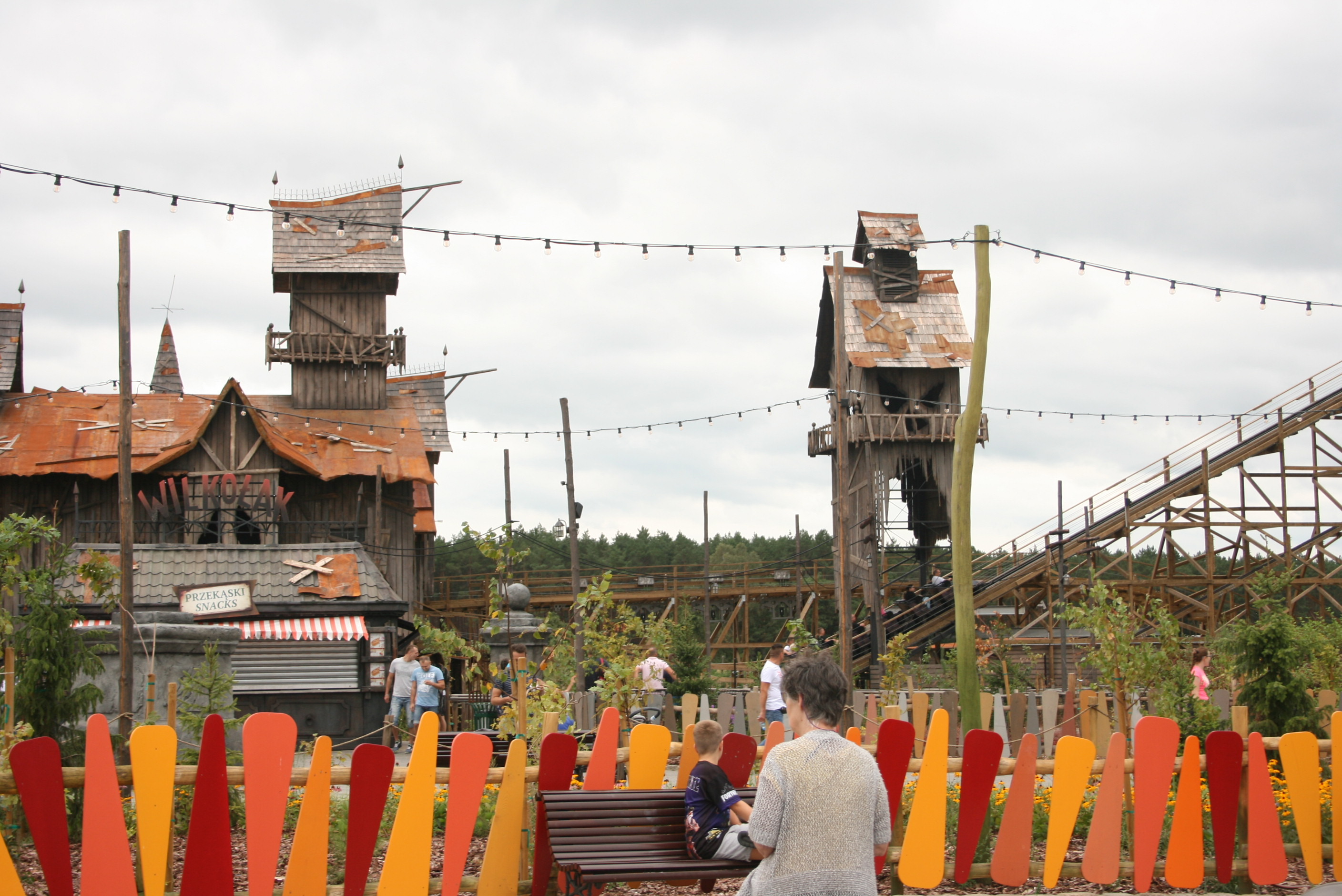

- Location within Poland
- Coordinates: 52°21′N 15°6′E
- Country: Poland
- Voivodeship: Lubusz
- County: Sulęcin
- Gmina: Torzym

Kownaty [kɔvˈnatɨ] is a village in the administrative district of Gmina Torzym, within Sulęcin County, Lubusz Voivodeship, in western Poland.
