= Prześlice =

- Village
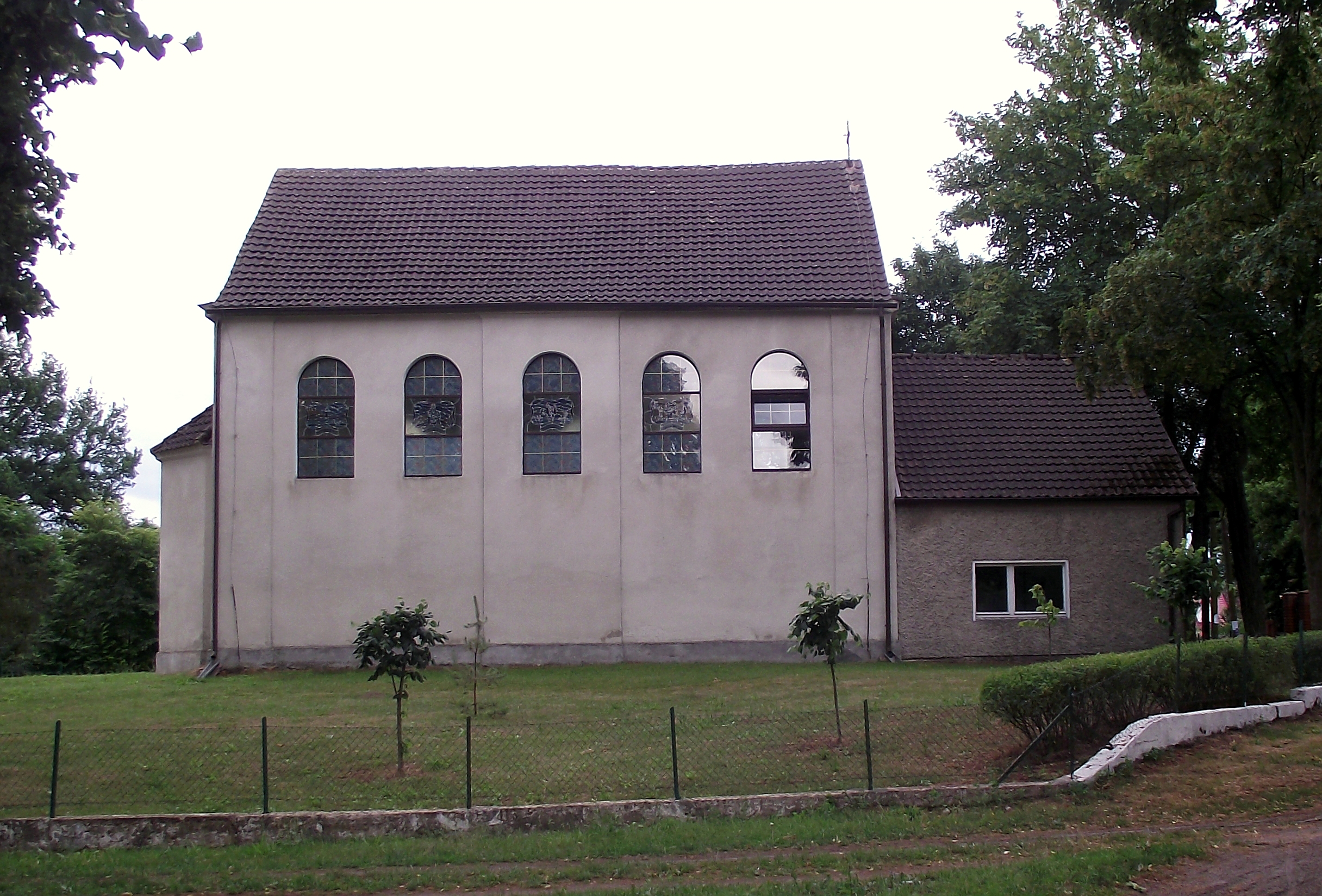

- Location within Poland
- Coordinates: 52°22′N 15°4′E
- Country: Poland
- Voivodeship: Lubusz
- County: Sulęcin
- Gmina: Torzym

Prześlice [pʂɛˈɕlit͡sɛ] is a village in the administrative district of Gmina Torzym, within Sulęcin County, Lubusz Voivodeship, in western Poland.
