= Debrznica =

- Village
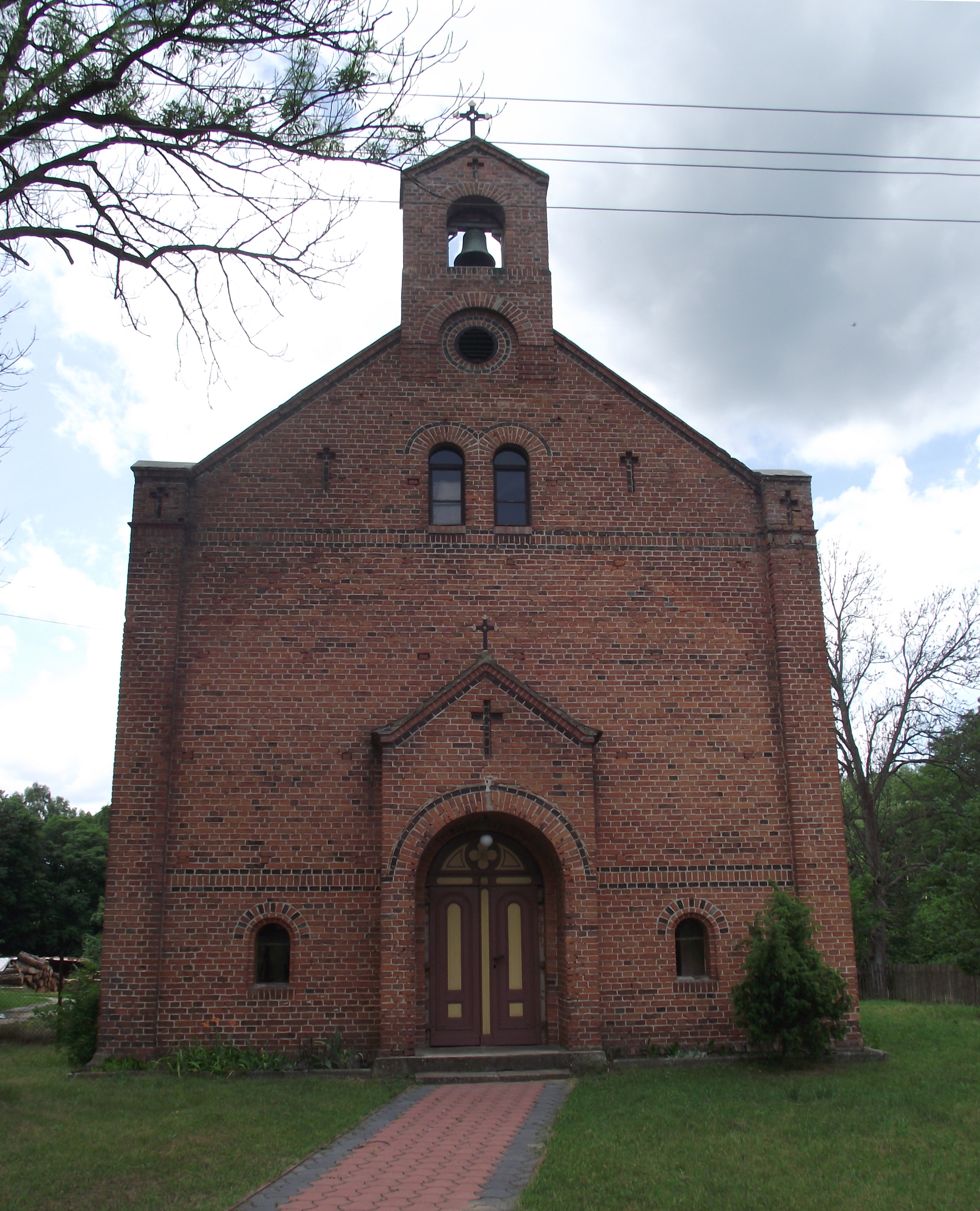

- Location within Poland
- Coordinates: 52°15′N 15°3′E
- Country: Poland
- Voivodeship: Lubusz
- County: Sulęcin
- Gmina: Torzym
- Population: 150

Debrznica [dɛbʐˈnit͡sa] is a village in the administrative district of Gmina Torzym, within Sulęcin County, Lubusz Voivodeship, in western Poland.
