= Gądków Wielki =

- Village
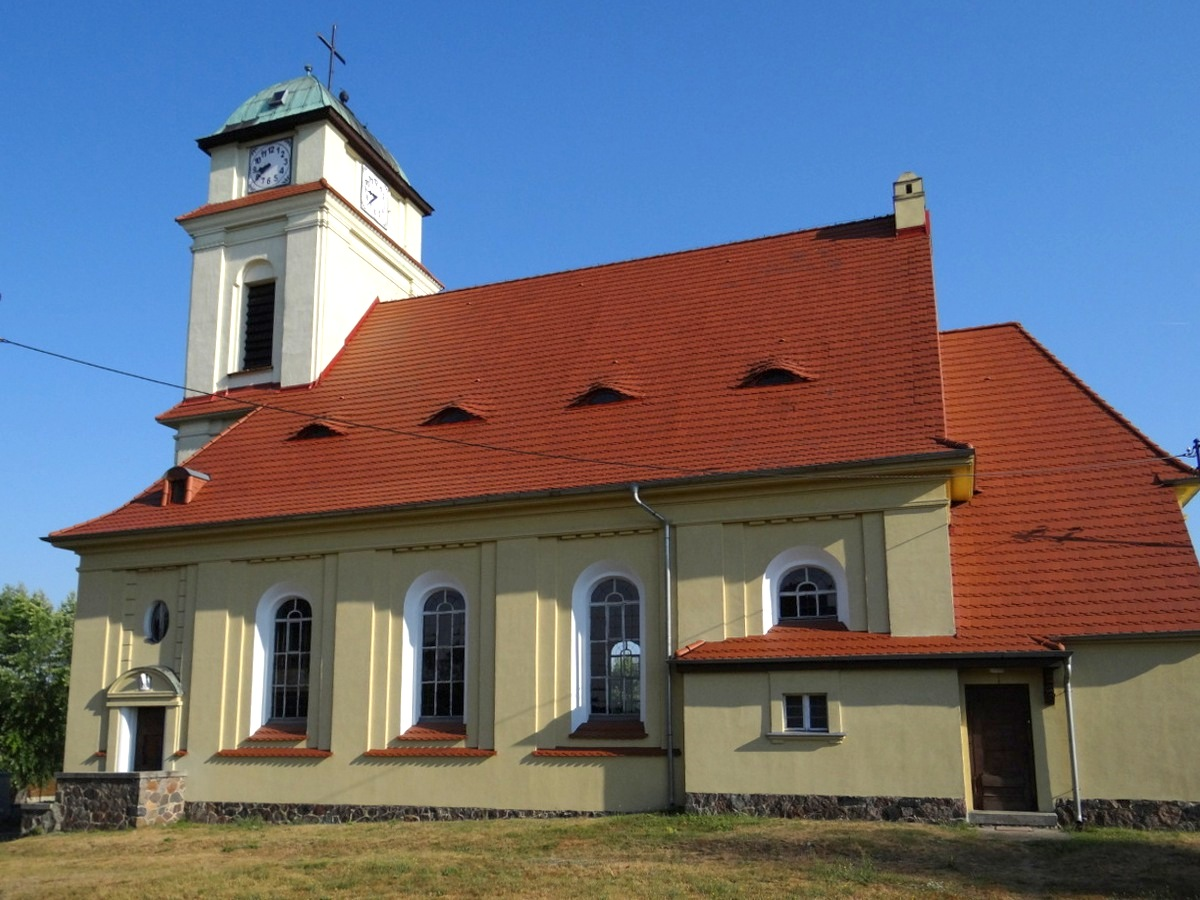
- Catholic church

- Location within Poland
- Coordinates: 52°14′26″N 14°58′21″E
- Country: Poland
- Voivodeship: Lubusz
- County: Sulęcin
- Gmina: Torzym
- Population: 700

Gądków Wielki (Polish pronunciation: [ˈɡɔntkuv ˈvjɛlkʲi]) is a village in the administrative district of Gmina Torzym, within Sulęcin County, Lubusz Voivodeship, in western Poland.
