= Pniów, Lubusz Voivodeship =

Pniów
- Village
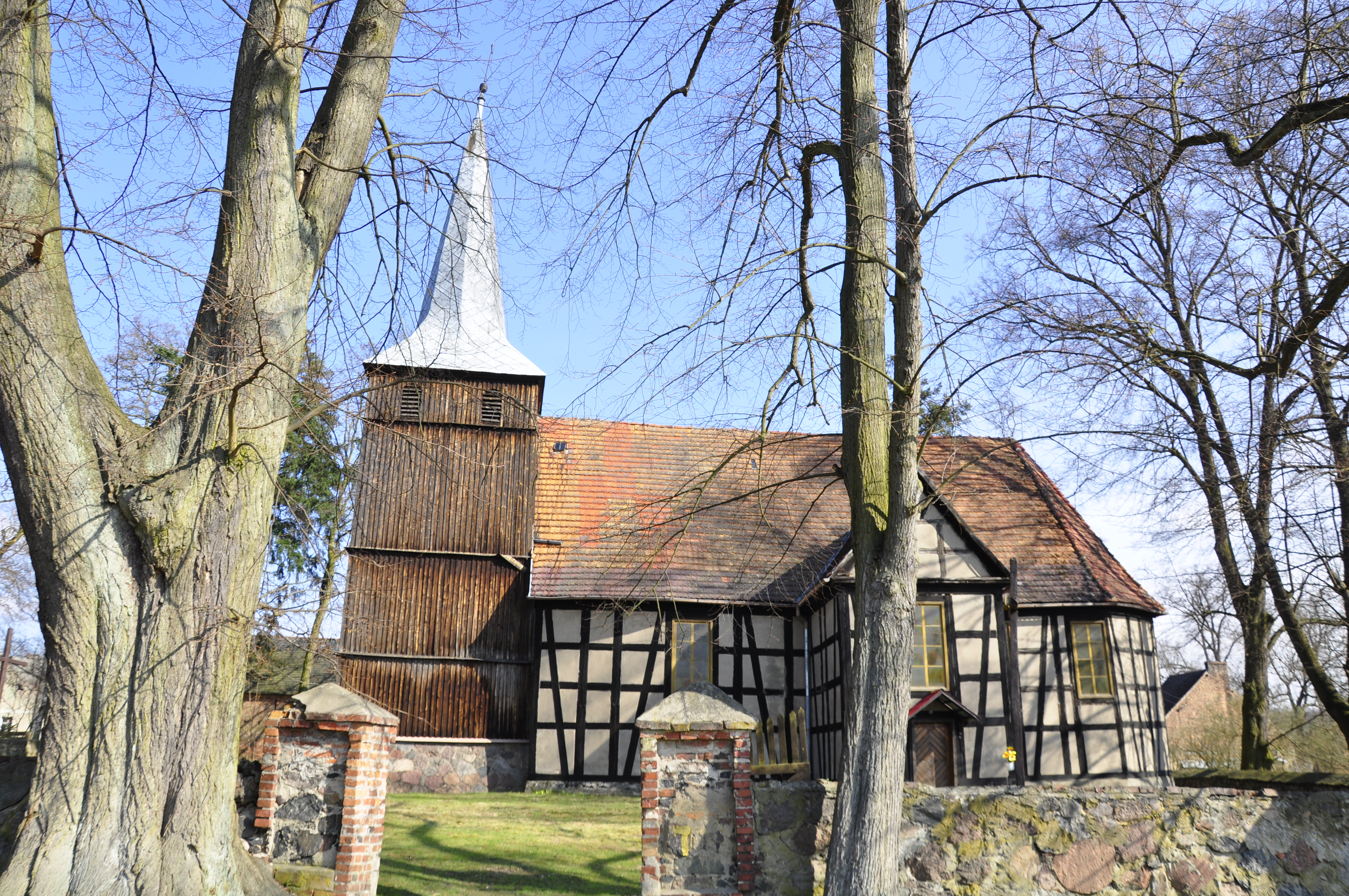
- Timber framed Our Lady of the Rosary church

- Location within Poland
- Coordinates: 52°19′36″N 15°00′51″E
- Country: Poland
- Voivodeship: Lubusz
- County: Sulęcin
- Gmina: Torzym
- Time zone: UTC+1 (CET)
  - Summer (DST): UTC+2 (CEST)
- Vehicle registration: FSU

Pniów [pɲuf] is a village in the administrative district of Gmina Torzym, within Sulęcin County, Lubusz Voivodeship, in western Poland.

During World War II, in 1940−1943, Nazi Germany operated a forced labour camp for Jewish men in the village.
