= Rojek, Sulęcin County =

Rojek
- Settlement
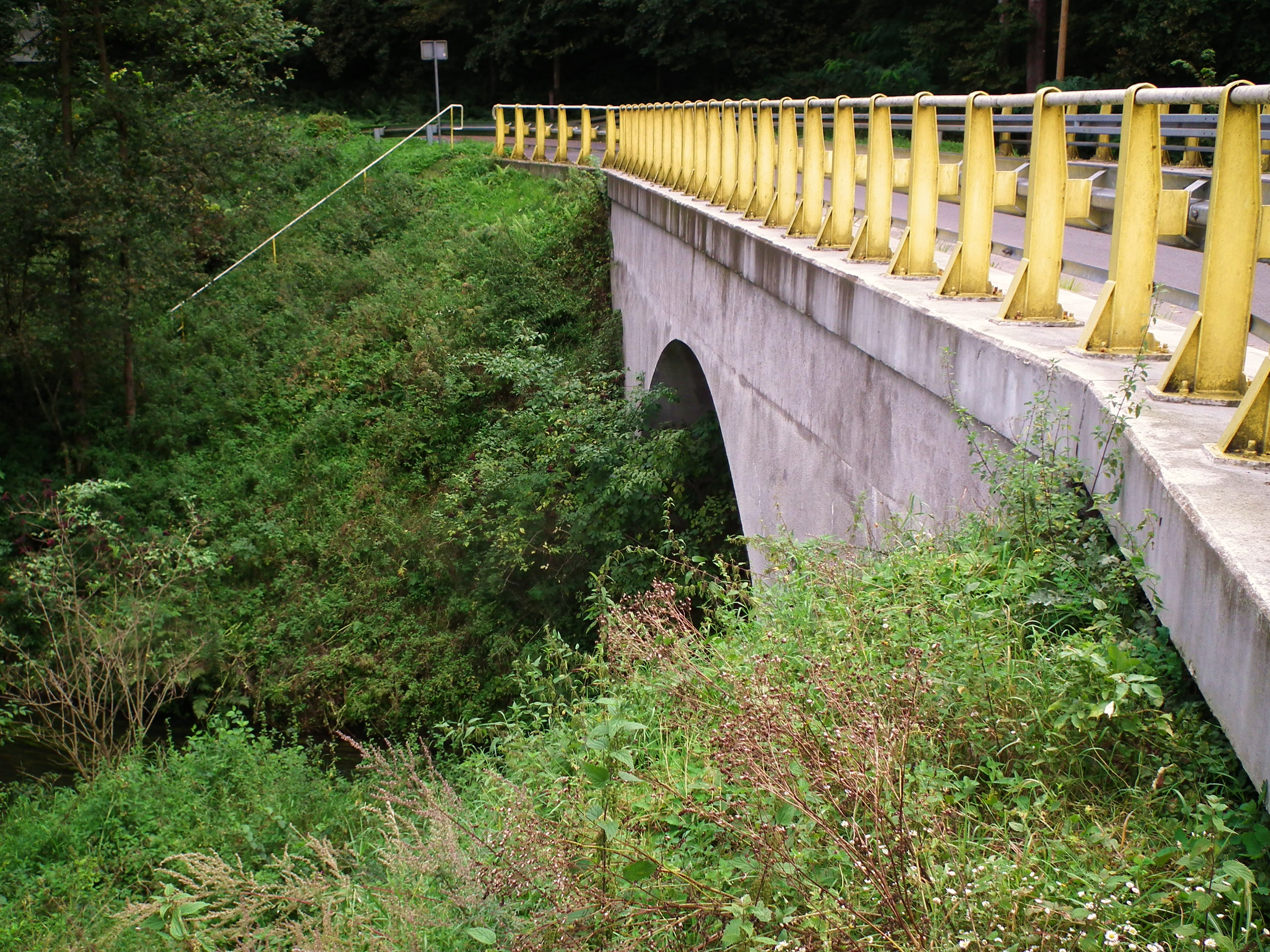

- Location within Poland
- Coordinates: 52°21′28″N 14°57′15″E
- Country: Poland
- Voivodeship: Lubusz
- County: Sulęcin
- Gmina: Torzym

Rojek [ˈrɔjɛk] is a settlement in the administrative district of Gmina Torzym, within Sulęcin County, Lubusz Voivodeship, in western Poland.
