= Rojek (surname) =

Rojek is a Polish-language surname. Notable people with the surname include:

- Artur Rojek (born 1972), Polish guitarist and singer
- Józef Rojek (born 1950), Polish politician
- Krzysztof Rojek (born 1972), Polish boxer
- Stan Rojek (1919–1997), American baseball player
