= Gmina Torzym =

Gmina Torzym Torzym Commune
- Gmina
- Coat of arms
- Interactive map of Gmina Torzym
- Coordinates (Torzym): 52°18′46″N 15°4′40″E
- Country: Poland
- Voivodeship: Lubusz
- County: Sulęcin
- Seat: Torzym

Area
  - Total: 374.87 km^{2} (144.74 sq mi)

Population (2019-06-30)
  - Total: 6,820
  - Density: 18.2/km^{2} (47.1/sq mi)
  - Urban: 2,526
  - Rural: 4,294
- Website: http://www.torzym.pl

Gmina Torzym is an urban-rural gmina (administrative district) in Sulęcin County, Lubusz Voivodeship, in western Poland. Its seat is the town of Torzym, which lies approximately 16 kilometres (10 mi) south of Sulęcin, 49 km (30 mi) south of Gorzów Wielkopolski, and 51 km (32 mi) north-west of Zielona Góra.

The gmina covers an area of 374.87 square kilometres (144.7 sq mi), and as of 2019 its total population is 6,820.

== Villages ==
Apart from the town of Torzym, Gmina Torzym contains the villages and settlements of Bargów, Bielice, Bobrówko, Boczów, Debrznica, Drzewce, Drzewce-Kolonia, Gądków Mały, Gądków Wielki, Garbicz, Grabów, Jelenie Pole, Koryta, Kownaty, Lubin, Lubów, Mierczany, Pniów, Prześlice, Rojek, Rożnówka, Tarnawa Rzepińska, Walewice and Wystok.

== Neighbouring gminas ==
Gmina Torzym is bordered by the gminas of Bytnica, Cybinka, Łagów, Maszewo, Ośno Lubuskie, Rzepin and Sulęcin.

== Twin towns – sister cities ==
Gmina Torzym is twinned with:

- Kolkwitz, Germany
