= Lubów, Lubusz Voivodeship =

Lubów
- Village
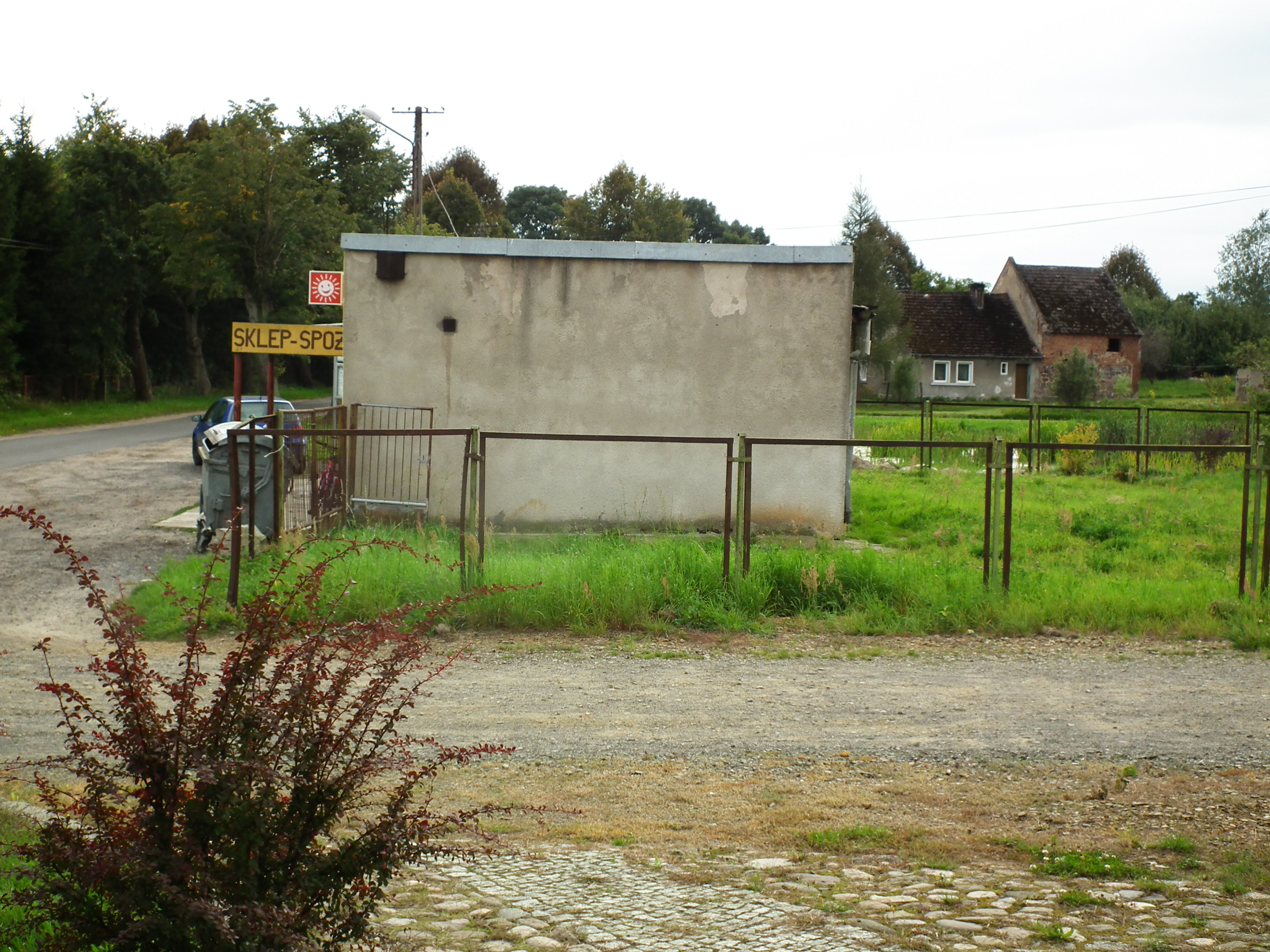

- Location within Poland
- Coordinates: 52°23′N 14°57′E
- Country: Poland
- Voivodeship: Lubusz
- County: Sulęcin
- Gmina: Torzym

Lubów [ˈlubuf] is a village in the administrative district of Gmina Torzym, within Sulęcin County, Lubusz Voivodeship, in western Poland.
