= Cerny =

Cerny may refer to:

- Cerny culture, culture of the Neolithic archaeological period, centred in the basin of the Seine, in France

== People ==
- Cerny (surname), lists people with the surname Černý or Cerny
- Elvire de Cerny (1818–1899), French writer and folklorist

== Places ==
- Cerny-lès-Bucy, commune in the Aisne department in northern France
- Cerny, Essonne, commune in the arrondissement of Étampes, Île-de-France
- Cerny-en-Laonnois, commune in the Aisne department in northern France

== See also ==
- Czerny (disambiguation)
- Czerna (disambiguation)
- Cerney (disambiguation)
- Cernay (disambiguation)
- Cerna (disambiguation)
