= Černá =

Černá may refer to:

== Places in the Czech Republic ==
- Černá (Žďár nad Sázavou District), a municipality and village in the Vysočina Region
- Černá (Lomnice nad Popelkou), a village and part of Lomnice nad Popelkou in the Liberec Region
- Černá, a village and part of Kraslice in the Karlovy Vary Region
- Černá v Pošumaví, a municipality and village in South Bohemian Region
- Černá u Bohdanče, a municipality and village in the Pardubice Region

== Other ==
- Černý (surname), feminine form: Černá, a Czech surname
- Black Pockau, called Černá in Czech, a river in Germany and the Czech Republic
- Schwarzwasser (Mulde), called Černá in Czech, a river in Germany and the Czech Republic

== See also ==
- Cerna (disambiguation)
- Czerna (disambiguation)
- Crna (disambiguation)
