= Cerna =

Cerna may refer to:

== Populated places ==
- Cerna, Croatia, Vukovar-Syrmia County, Croatia
- Černá (Žďár nad Sázavou District), Czech Republic
- Černá, Semily District, Czech Republic
- Cerna, Tulcea, Romania
- A village in Vaideeni Commune, Vâlcea County, Romania

== Rivers ==
=== Romania ===
- Cerna (Mureș), a tributary of the Mureș in Hunedoara County
- Cerna (Danube), a tributary of the Danube in southwestern Romania
- Cerna (Olteț), a tributary of the Olteț in Vâlcea County
- Cerna (Tulcea), a small tributary of the Danube in Tulcea County
- Cerna (Crasna), a tributary of the Crasna in Maramureș and Satu Mare Counties
- A tributary of the Mag river in Sibiu County

=== Other rivers ===
- Černá (river), a river in the Czech Republic and Germany

== People ==
- Cerna (surname)
- Černá (surname)

== Other ==
- ceRNA, competing endogenous RNA, a function of microRNA
- Cerna (political organization), part of Anova-Nationalist Brotherhood

== See also ==
- Černá (disambiguation)
- Černá Hora (disambiguation)
- Crna (disambiguation)
- Cerny (disambiguation)
- Cernay (disambiguation)
- Cerney (disambiguation)
- Cernat (disambiguation)
