= Cherna =

Cherna may refer to:

- Cherna (Arda), river in southern Bulgaria
- Cherna, Dobrich Province, a village in the municipality of Dobrichka, in Dobrich Province, in northeastern Bulgaria

== See also ==
- Cerna (disambiguation)
- Charna
- Černá
