= Czerny =

Czerny is a surname meaning "black" in some Slavic languages. It is one of many variant forms, including Czarny, Černý, Czernik, Cherney, and Čierny, among others.

== People ==
Notable people with this surname include:

- Adalbert Czerny (1863–1941), German pediatrician, co-founder of modern pediatrics
- Carl Czerny (1791–1857), Austrian pianist, composer, and teacher
- Joseph Czerny (1785–1842), composer and pianist
- George Czerny (1766–1817), alternate name of Serbian political leader Karađorđe Petrović
- Halina Czerny-Stefańska (1922–2001), Polish pianist
- Henry Czerny (born 1959), Canadian actor
- Leander Czerny (1859–1944), Czech entomologist
- Ludwig Czerny (born 1941), German technician, film producer, and film director
- Marianus Czerny (1896–1985), German experimental physicist
- Michael Czerny (born 1946), Roman Catholic Cardinal
- Sabine Czerny, Bavarian primary school teacher
- Vincenz Czerny (1842–1916), German surgeon
- Zygmunt Czerny (1888–1975), Polish romance philologist

== Fictional characters ==
- Tibor Czerny, a character in the 1939 film Midnight
- Czerny, a dog owned by Kanako Sensei in the manga series Inubaka
- Noah Czerny, a character in The Raven Cycle book series by Maggie Stiefvater

== Other ==
- 6294 Czerny, minor planet
- Hofmann & Czerny (Hofmann-Wien), piano manufacturing company from Austria

== See also ==
- Cerney (disambiguation)
- Churney (disambiguation)
