= Chernykh =

Chernykh, also transliterated Černych (Russian: Черных) is a Russian surname. Notable people with the surname include:

- Alexander Chernykh (born 1965), Russian ice hockey player
- Dmitri Chernykh (ice hockey) (born 1985), Russian ice hockey player
- Fedor Černych (born 1991), Lithuanian footballer
- Igor Chernykh (1932–2020), Russian camera operator
- Lyudmila Chernykh (1935–2017), Soviet astronomer
- Nikolai Chernykh (1931–2004), Soviet astronomer

== Other ==
- 2325 Chernykh
- 101P/Chernykh

== See also ==
- Cerna (surname)
- Cerna (disambiguation)
