= Cernea =

Cernea is a Romanian surname. Notable people with the surname include:

- Cornel Cernea (born 1976), Romanian goalkeeping coach and footballer
- Ion Cernea (1933–2025), Romanian Greco-Roman wrestler
- Michael M. Cernea (born 1931), Romania sociologist and anthropologist
- Remus Cernea (born 1974), Romanian activist
- Ruth Cernea (1934–2009), American cultural anthropologist

== Other ==
- Acidalia cernea, the alternative name of Scopula epigypsa, a moth of the family Geometridae

== See also ==
- Cerna (surname)
- Cerna (disambiguation)
