= Charna =

- Gender: Feminine
- Language: Yiddish

Origin
- Language: Slavic languages
- Meaning: Black, dark

Other names
- Alternative spelling: Cherna, Cherne, Tscharna
- Pet names: Charnke, Chernke, Charnele, Chernele

Charna or Cherna (Yiddish: טשאַרנאַ, טשאַרנע, or טשערנע) is a Yiddish-language feminine given name, from a Slavic word meaning "black" or "dark". Notable people with the name include:

- Charnele Brown (born c. 1959), American actress
- Charna Furman (born 1941), Uruguayan architect
- Charna Halpern (born 1952), American comedian
- Tscharna Rayss (1890–1965), Russian-Israeli botanist

== See also ==
- Czerny
- Charnas (surname)
- Chernoff
