= Konin Żagański railway station =

Railway station in south-western Poland

Konin Żagański
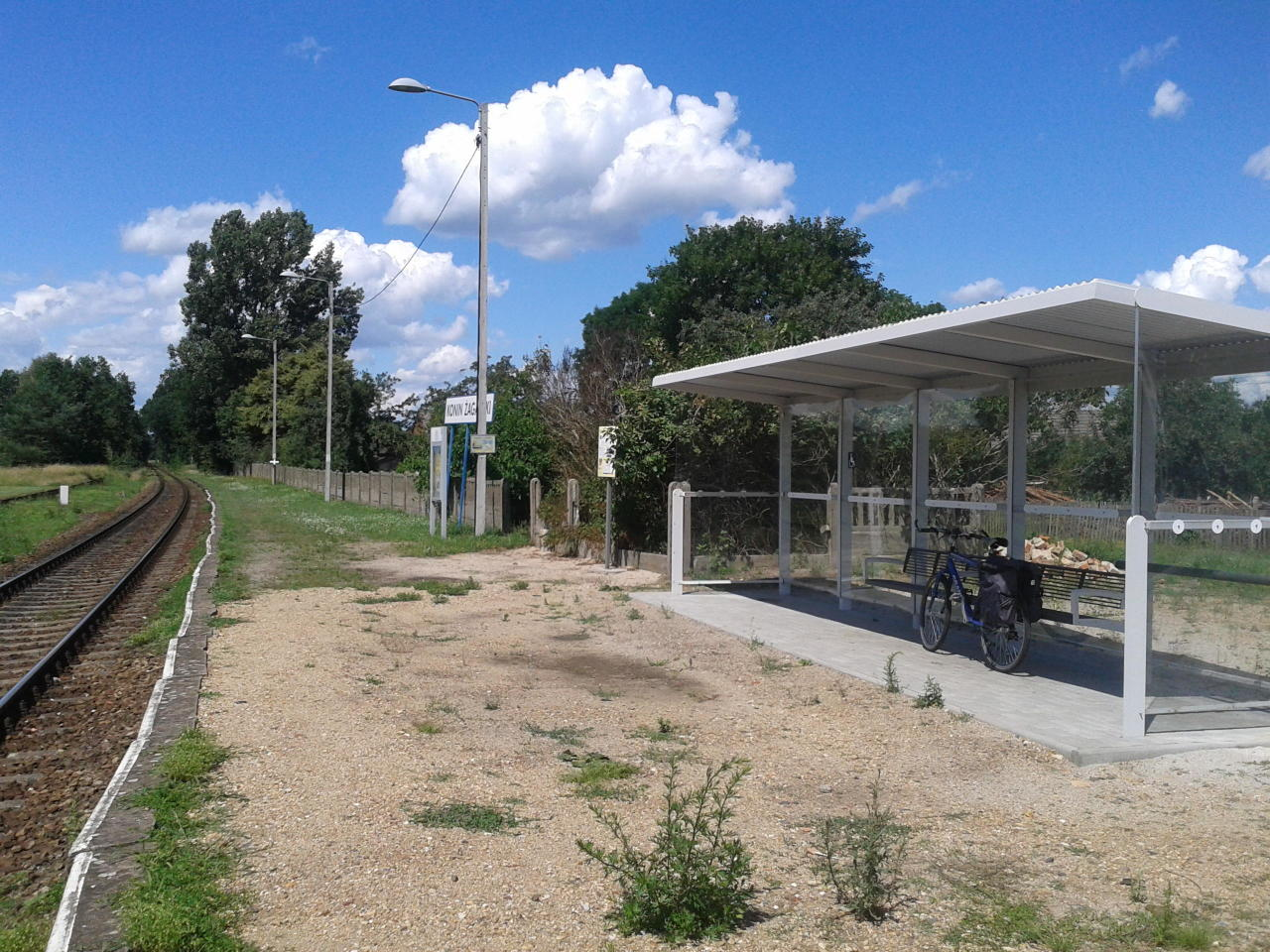
- Platform in July 2016, prior to its reconstruction

General information
- Location: Konin Żagański, Lubusz Voivodeship; Poland
- Coordinates: 51°32′47.0″N 15°11′27.0″E
- Owner: Polish State Railways
- Line: Miłkowice–Jasień railway
- Platforms: 1
- Tracks: 1

History
- Opened: 1897
- Former names: Cunau (1897–1912); Kunau (1912–1945); Kunowa (1945–1947)

Services
Preceding station	Polregio	Following station
Iłowa Żagańska towards Görlitz	PR	Jankowa Żagańska towards Zielona Góra Główna
Location
- Location within Poland

Konin Żagański is a railway station on the Miłkowice–Jasień railway in the village of Konin Żagański, Żagań County, within the Lubusz Voivodeship in south-western Poland.

== History ==
The station opened in 1897 as Cunau, which was later renamed to Kunau in 1912. After World War II, the area came under Polish administration. As a result, the station was taken over by Polish State Railways. The station was renamed to Kunowa and later to its modern name, Konin Żagański in 1947.

The station building was demolished in 2015. Platforms were rebuilt in 2021.

== Train services ==
The station is served by the following service(s):

- Regional services (R) Görlitz - Żary - Zielona Góra
