= Czerna =

Czerna may refer to:

- Czerna, Bolesławiec County in Lower Silesian Voivodeship (south-west Poland)
- Czerna, Głogów County in Lower Silesian Voivodeship (south-west Poland)
- Czerna, Gmina Miękinia in Środa County, Lower Silesian Voivodeship (south-west Poland)
- Czerna, Lesser Poland Voivodeship (south Poland)
- Czerna, Żagań County in Lubusz Voivodeship (west Poland)
- Czerna, Żary County in Lubusz Voivodeship (west Poland)

== See also ==
- Černá (disambiguation)
- Czerny (surname)
