= Iłowa =

Town in Lubusz Voivodeship, Poland

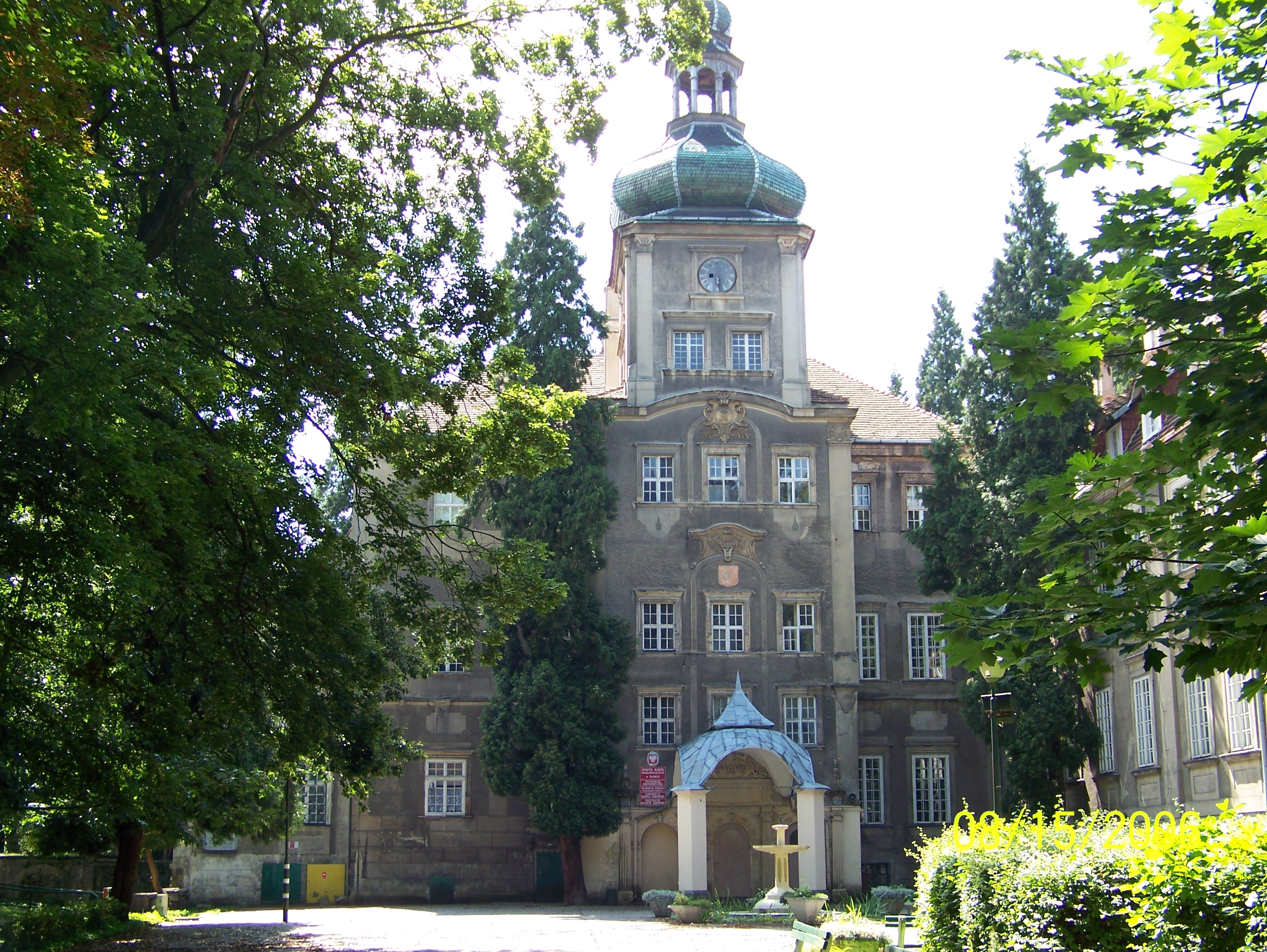
- Palace in Iłowa

- Coat of arms

- Location within Poland
- Coordinates: 51°30′7″N 15°12′21″E
- Country: Poland
- Voivodeship: Lubusz
- County: Żagań
- Gmina: Iłowa
- Established: 10th century
- City rights: 1679–1830, since 1962

Government
  - Mayor: Paweł Lichtański

Area
  - Total: 9.11 km^{2} (3.52 sq mi)
- Elevation: 125 m (410 ft)

Population (2019-06-30)
  - Total: 3,892
  - Density: 427/km^{2} (1,110/sq mi)
- Time zone: UTC+1 (CET)
  - Summer (DST): UTC+2 (CEST)
- Postal code: 68-120
- Car plates: FZG
- Website: http://www.ilowa.pl

Iłowa [iˈwɔva] (German: Halbau) is a town in Żagań County, in Lubusz Voivodeship, in western Poland, the administrative seat of the Gmina Iłowa.

== Geography ==
It lies in the easternmost part of the historic Upper Lusatia region, at the border with Lower Silesia. The settlement is located on the Czerna Mała river, a tributary to the Bóbr, in the Silesian-Lusatian Lowlands. It is situated on the rim of the Lower Silesian Wilderness and just south of the A18 autostrada.

== History ==
The settlement arose in the 10th century, at the crossroad of the trade routes from Görlitz to Żagań and from Gubin to Legnica. The medieval chronicler Thietmar of Merseburg (975–1018) mentioned a castle of Ilva, where in 1000 AD the Polish duke Bolesław I Chrobry met with Emperor Otto III on his journey from the canonization of Bishop Adalbert of Prague to the Congress of Gniezno. As a result of the fragmentation of Poland, from the 12th century onwards, the border fortress was controlled by the Piast dukes of Silesia. Iłowa's inhabitants took part in the 1241 Battle of Legnica against the invading Mongols.

Iłowa itself is first documented in a 1356 deed by the Bohemian king and Emperor Charles IV, when he granted the fief of das halbe Dorf an der Czirne (i.e. half the village on the Czerna River, later called Halbau) at the border with the Silesian Duchy of Żagań to the Kotowice noble family. Mining and smelting of bog iron in the area is documented since the 15th century. The Kotowice family had a castle built here, that later became a notorious robber baron stronghold and was later destroyed by armed forces of the Lusatian League at the behest of the Görlitz citizens in 1440. The Kotowice dynasty sold the estates of Halbau together with neighbouring Konin to the Upper Lusatian state country of Königsbrück in 1567.

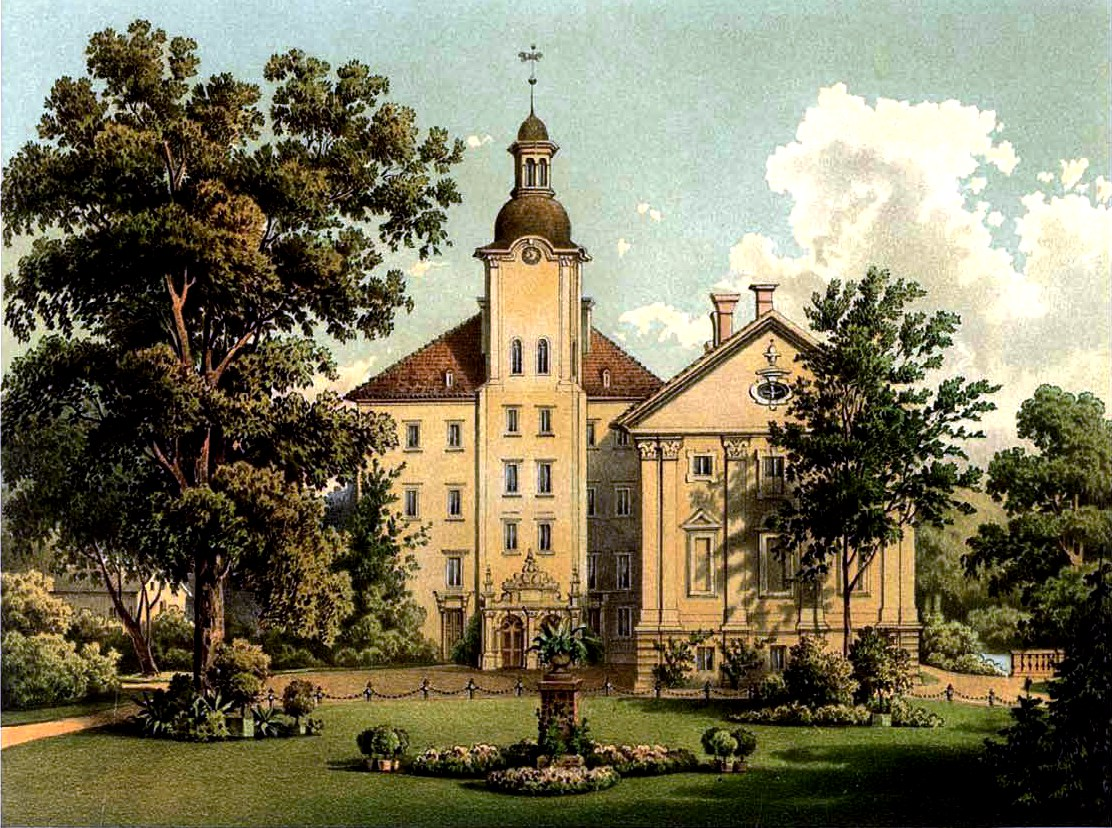
19th-century view of the palace

According to an annex to the 1635 Peace of Prague, Iłowa together with Upper Lusatia passed from the Lands of the Bohemian Crown to the Wettin elector John George I of Saxony. Under the rule of his successor Elector John George II, a Protestant church was built and the settlement received town privileges in 1679. From 1682 it was incorporated as a southern exclave into the Lower Lusatian lordship of Żary held by the Promnitz noble family. Between 1697 and 1815 it was also under rule of Polish monarchs in personal union.

After the Congress of Vienna the town was annexed by Prussia in 1815, and became part of the province of Silesia.

During World War II, the Germans operated the Dulag A and Dulag B transit camps for Polish prisoners of war in the town in 1939–1940, and a subcamp of the Gross-Rosen concentration camp, whose prisoners were mostly Poles, but also Russians, Czechs, Italians, French, Greeks, Yugoslavs, Dutch and Germans, in 1944–1945. On 12 February 1945, most prisoners were sent on a death march to the Bergen-Belsen concentration camp, whereas those sick or unable to march were left in the subcamp, where they were eventually liberated by 20 February. After Nazi Germany's defeat in the war, the abandoned town once again became part of Poland. Iłowa's first post-war Polish wójt was Stefan Urbański, a former forced labourer returning from Germany.

After the war the village Żaków and the eastern part of the village Karolinów have been incorporated into the town limits. Town privileges were restored in 1962.

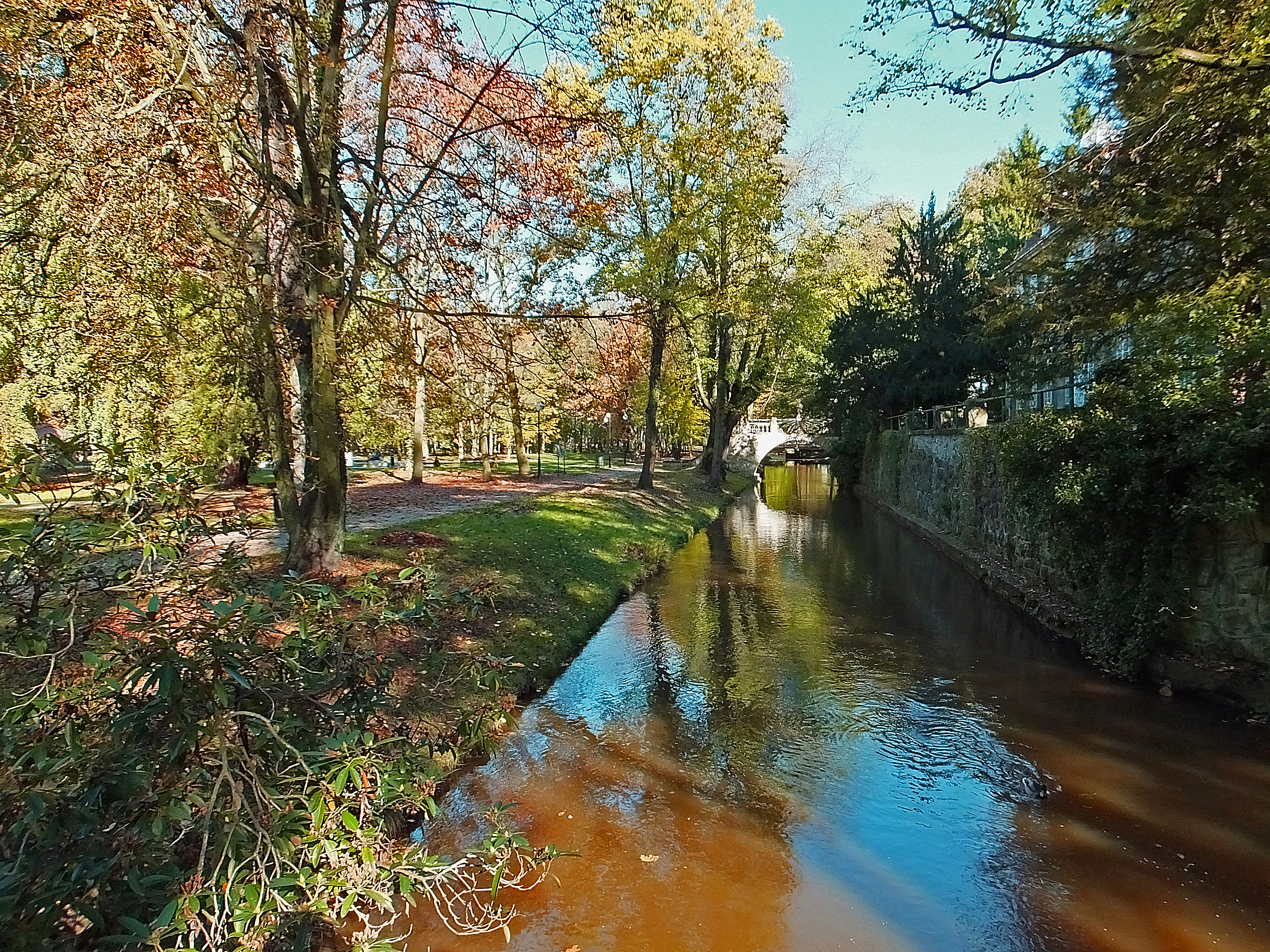
Park and Czerna Mała River in Iłowa

== Transport ==
The town is served by Iłowa Żagańska railway station, which is served by Polregio regional trains, and lies on the Miłkowice–Jasień railway.

== Notable people ==
- Friedrich Boser (1811–1881), artist

== Twin towns – sister cities ==
See twin towns of Gmina Iłowa.
