= Chernoff =

Chernoff may be either a Jewish surname, meaning "descendant of Charna" or a German-language transliteration of the Russian surname Chernov. Notable people with the surname include:

- Herman Chernoff (1923–2026), American applied mathematician, statistician and physicist
- Maxine Chernoff (born 1952), American novelist, writer, poet, academic and literary magazine editor
- Mike Chernoff (disambiguation), multiple people
- Paul Chernoff (1942–2017), American mathematician
