= Cernat (surname) =

Cernat is a Romanian surname. It originates from the Slavic root ćern-, meaning "black", along with the suffix -at. Černat(a) is a Slavic cognate.

The surname may refer to:

- Alexandru Cernat (1828–1893), Romanian general and politician
- Florin Cernat (born 1980), Romanian footballer
- Paul Cernat (born 1972), Romanian author

== See also ==
- Cernat (disambiguation)
- Cerna (surname)
