= Klików =

- Village
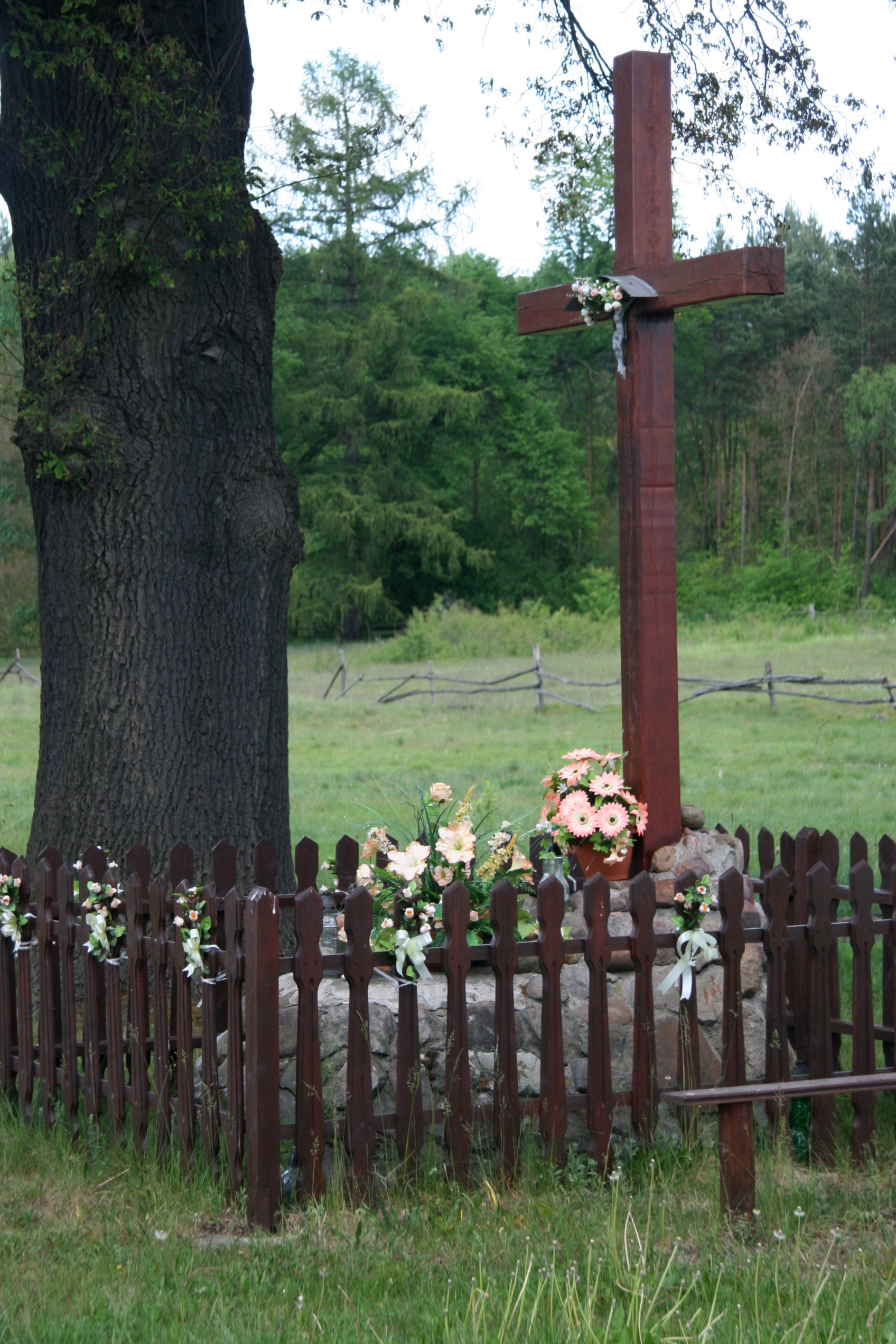
- Roadside cross

- Location within Poland
- Coordinates: 51°28′4″N 15°11′59″E
- Country: Poland
- Voivodeship: Lubusz
- County: Żagań
- Gmina: Iłowa

Klików [ˈklikuf] is a village in the administrative district of Gmina Iłowa, within Żagań County, Lubusz Voivodeship, in western Poland.
