= Szczepanów, Lubusz Voivodeship =

Szczepanów
- Village
- Location within Poland
- Coordinates: 51°34′N 15°12′E
- Country: Poland
- Voivodeship: Lubusz
- County: Żagań
- Gmina: Iłowa

Szczepanów [ʂt͡ʂɛˈpanuf] is a village in the administrative district of Gmina Iłowa, within Żagań County, Lubusz Voivodeship, in western Poland.
