= Jankowa Żagańska =

- Village
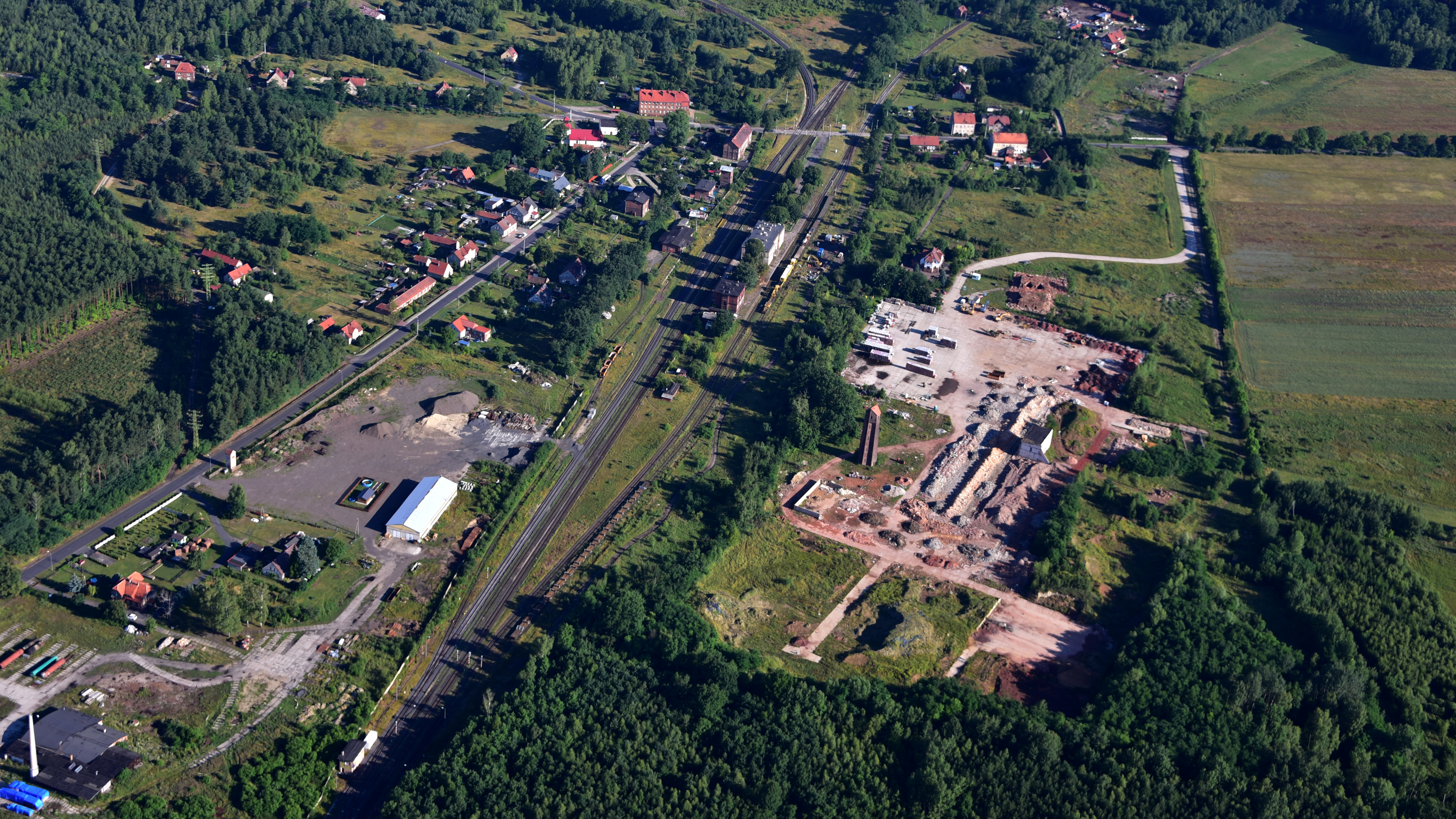

- Location within Poland
- Coordinates: 51°35′N 15°10′E
- Country: Poland
- Voivodeship: Lubusz
- County: Żagań
- Gmina: Iłowa
- Population (approx.): 600

Jankowa Żagańska ([janˈkɔva ʐaˈɡaɲska]; German: Hansdorf) is a village in the administrative district of Gmina Iłowa, within Żagań County, Lubusz Voivodeship, in western Poland. Jankowa Żagańska railway station serves the area.
