= Nowoszów =

- Village
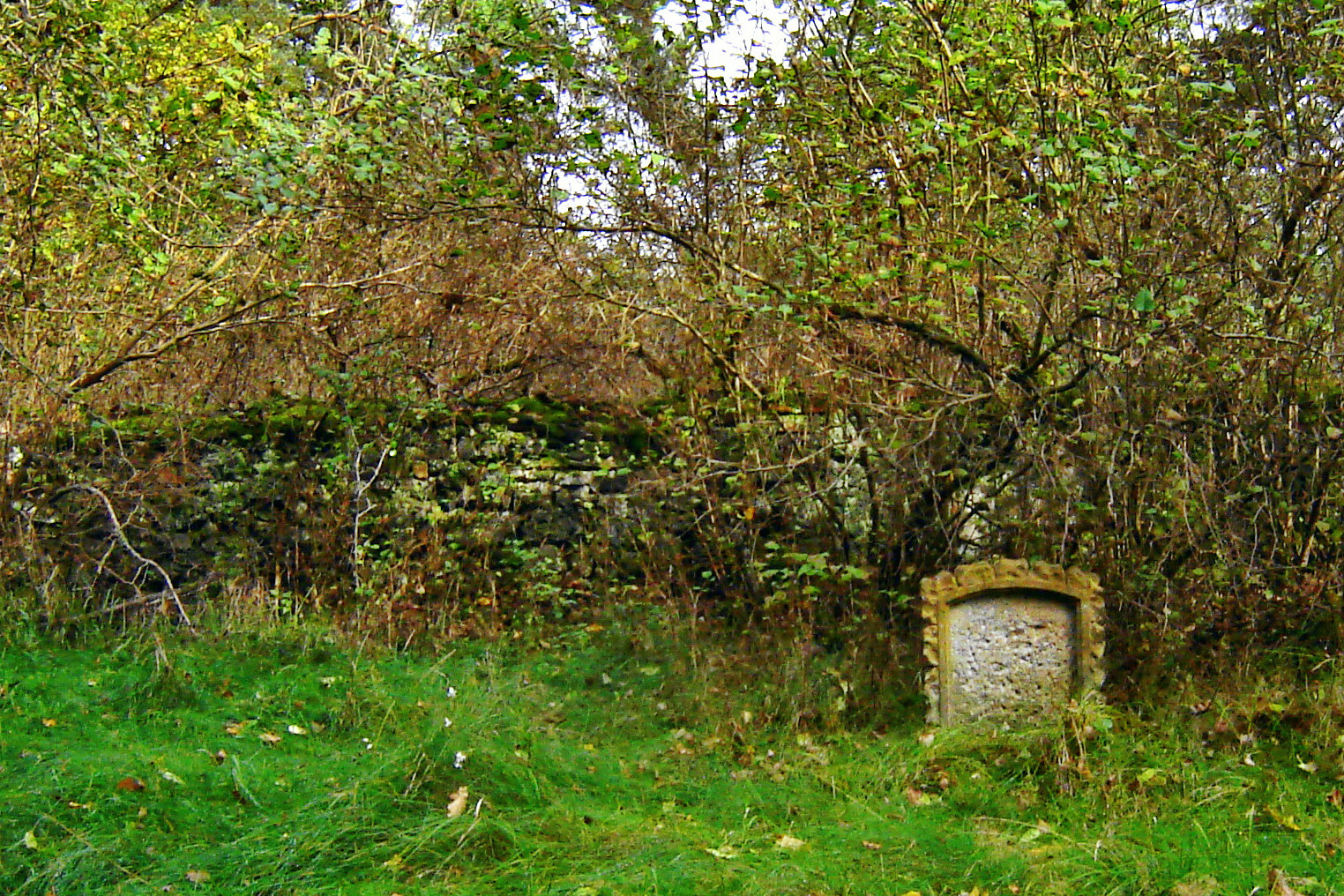

- Location within Poland
- Coordinates: 51°26′28″N 15°16′18″E
- Country: Poland
- Voivodeship: Lubusz
- County: Żagań
- Gmina: Iłowa
- Population: 0

Nowoszów [nɔˈvɔʂuf] (German: Neuhaus) is an abandoned market town in the administrative district of Gmina Iłowa, within Żagań County, Lubusz Voivodeship, in western Poland.

Founded in the 13th century, the small Town was destroyed in 1366 by the Lusatian League when the Archbishop of Breslau decided to establish a Staple for Woad. The League was fined a high repentance, but the City of Görlitz was able to maintain its monopoly on Woadtrade.
