= Kowalice =

- Village
- Location within Poland
- Coordinates: 51°29′18″N 15°13′53″E
- Country: Poland
- Voivodeship: Lubusz
- County: Żagań
- Gmina: Iłowa
- Population: 34
- Postal code: 68-120
- Number Zone: (+48) 68
- Vehicle registration: FZG

Kowalice [kɔvaˈlit͡sɛ] is a village in the administrative district of Gmina Iłowa, within Żagań County, Lubusz Voivodeship, in western Poland.
