= Friedrich Boser =

German artist (1811–1881)

- Born: 1811; Halbau, Prussian Silesia
- Died: 1881 (aged 69–70); Düsseldorf

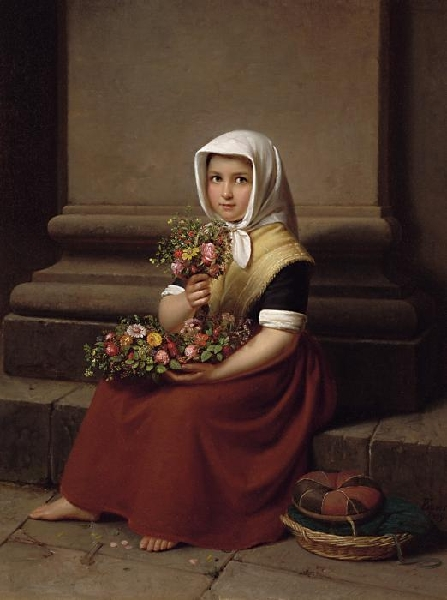
Flower Girl

Karl Friedrich Adolf Boser (1811–1881) was a German artist. He studied in Dresden, Berlin, and Düsseldorf; his paintings, chiefly genre subjects and portraits, were popular. He is associated with the Düsseldorf school of painting.

== Gallery ==
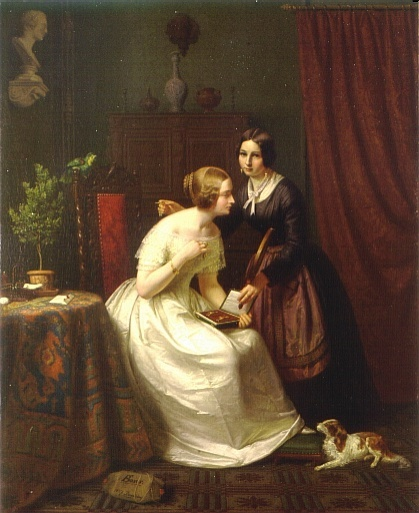
The Gifted Bride (1847)

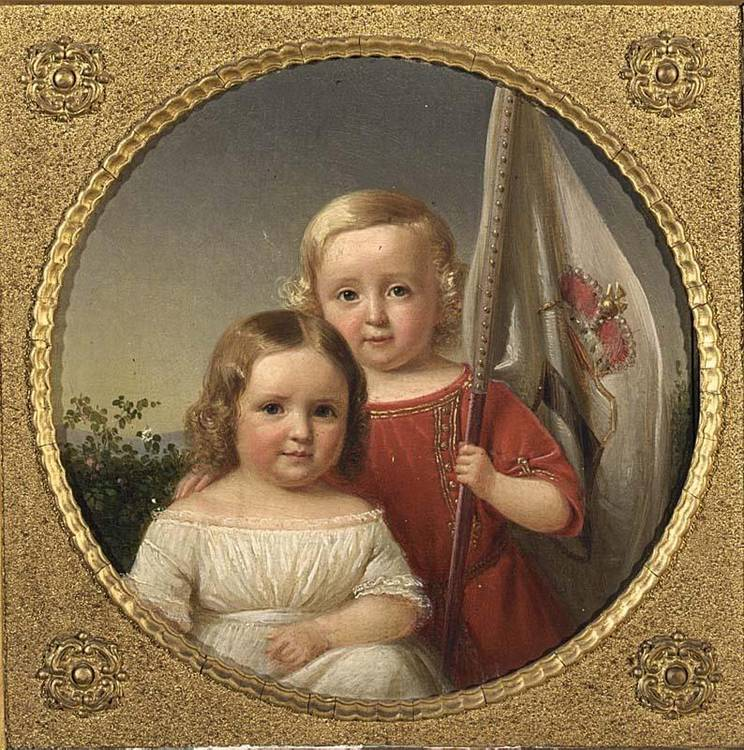
Children of the Ysenburg family (1845)

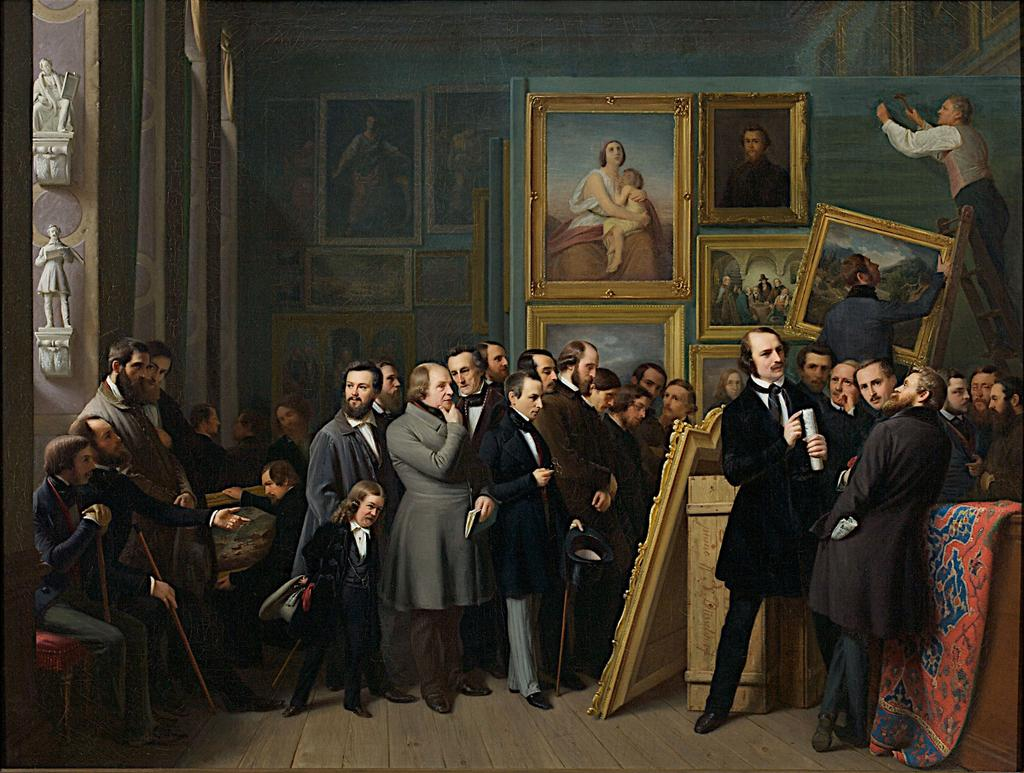
Düsseldorf artists in the art academy

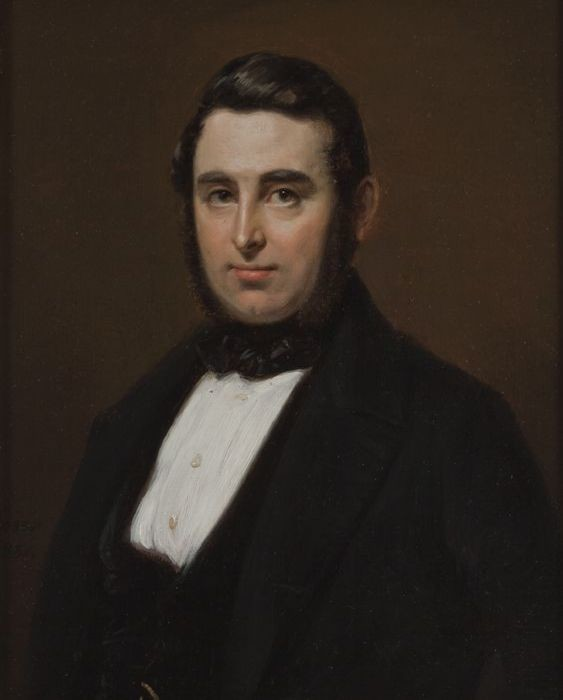
Huibert van Rijckevorsel (1851)

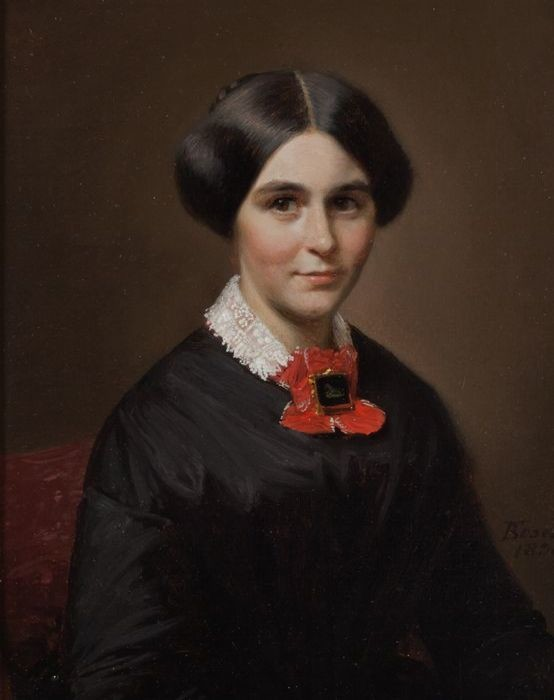
Elise Susanne Marie Schmidt, wife of Huibert van Rijckevorsel

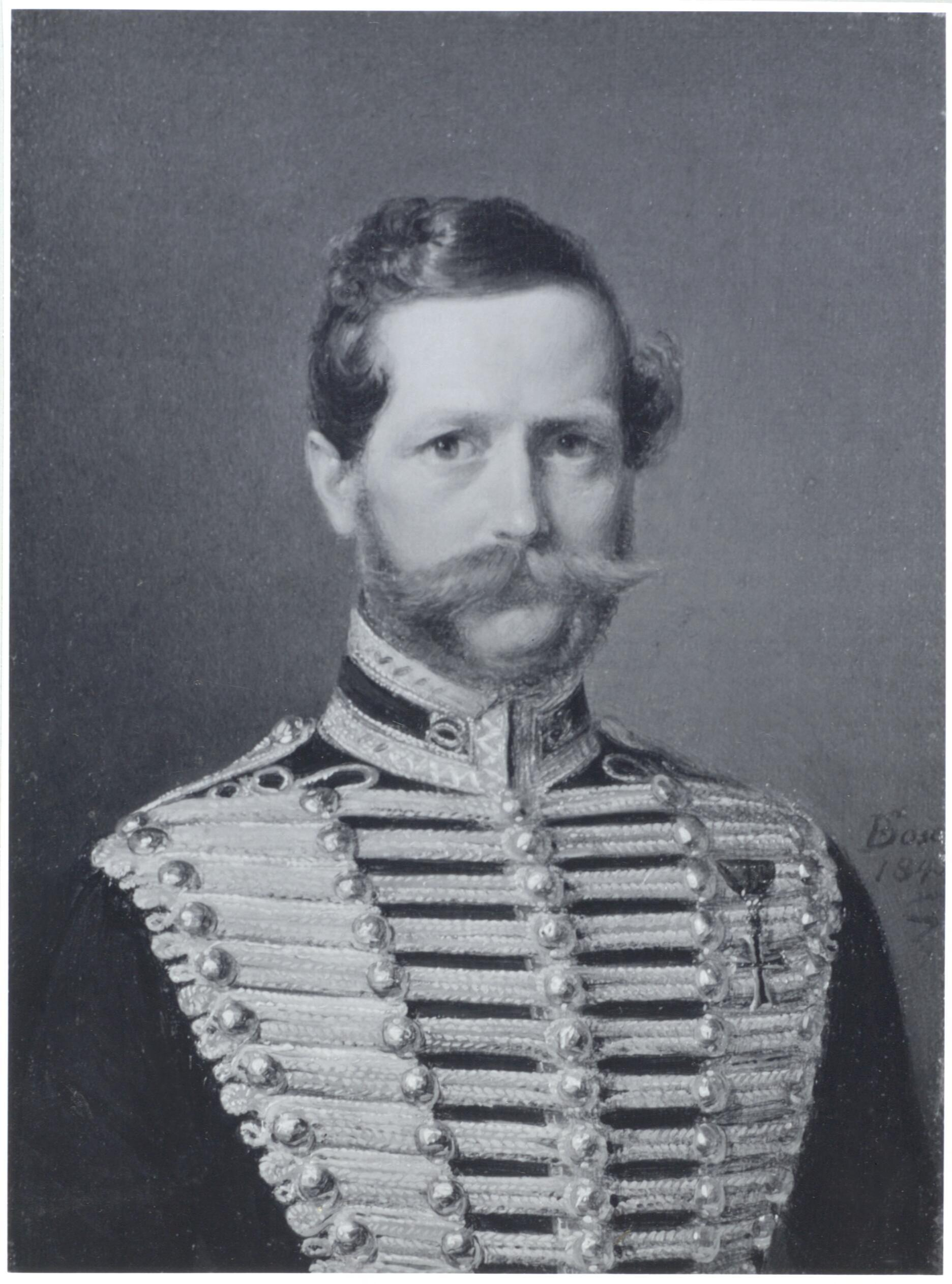
General Wilhelm Anton Adrian Constantin von Knobelsdorff (1844)

== See also ==
- List of German painters
