= Borowe, Lubusz Voivodeship =

Borowe
- Village
- Location within Poland
- Coordinates: 51°29′N 15°7′E
- Country: Poland
- Voivodeship: Lubusz
- County: Żagań
- Gmina: Iłowa
- Population: 471

Borowe [bɔˈrɔvɛ] (German Burau) is a village in the administrative district of Gmina Iłowa, within Żagań County, Lubusz Voivodeship, in western Poland.
