= Czyżówek =

- Village
- Location within Poland
- Coordinates: 51°30′16″N 15°10′12″E
- Country: Poland
- Voivodeship: Lubusz
- County: Żagań
- Gmina: Iłowa
- Population: 185

Czyżówek [t͡ʂɨˈʐuvɛk] is a village in the administrative district of Gmina Iłowa, within Żagań County, Lubusz Voivodeship, in western Poland.
