= Wilkowisko, Lubusz Voivodeship =

Wilkowisko
- Village
- Location within Poland
- Coordinates: 51°34′13″N 15°13′25″E
- Country: Poland
- Voivodeship: Lubusz
- County: Żagań
- Gmina: Iłowa

Wilkowisko [vilkɔˈviskɔ] is a village in the administrative district of Gmina Iłowa, within Żagań County, Lubusz Voivodeship, in western Poland.
