= Gmina Iłowa =

Gmina Iłowa Iłowa Commune
- Gmina
- Coat of arms
- Interactive map of Gmina Iłowa
- Coordinates (Iłowa): 51°30′7″N 15°12′21″E
- Country: Poland
- Voivodeship: Lubusz
- County: Żagań
- Seat: Iłowa

Area
  - Total: 153.05 km^{2} (59.09 sq mi)

Population (2019-06-30)
  - Total: 6,881
  - Density: 44.96/km^{2} (116.4/sq mi)
  - Urban: 3,892
  - Rural: 2,989
- Website: http://www.ilowa.pl

Gmina Iłowa is an urban-rural gmina (administrative district) in Żagań County, Lubusz Voivodeship, in western Poland. Its seat is the town of Iłowa, which lies approximately 15 kilometres (9 mi) south-west of Żagań and 53 km (33 mi) south-west of Zielona Góra.

The gmina covers an area of 153.05 square kilometres (59.1 sq mi), and as of 2019 its total population is 6,881.

== Villages ==
Apart from the town of Iłowa, Gmina Iłowa contains the villages and settlements of Borowe, Czerna, Czyżówek, Jankowa Żagańska, Klików, Konin Żagański, Kowalice, Nowoszów, Szczepanów, Wilkowisko and Żaganiec.

== Neighbouring gminas ==
Gmina Iłowa is bordered by the towns of Gozdnica and Żagań, and by the gminas of Osiecznica, Węgliniec, Wymiarki, Żagań and Żary.

== Twin towns – sister cities ==
Gmina Iłowa is twinned with:

- Blanzy, France
- Jänschwalde, Germany
- Rietschen, Germany
