= Churney =

Churney is a surname. Notable people with the surname include:

- Russell Churney (1964–2007), English composer, pianist, arranger and musical director, brother of Sophia Churney
- Sophia Churney (active from 1998), English singer-songwriter, sister of Russell Churney

== Fictional characters ==
- Mayor Churney, a fictional character in the 2001 Fox Family television film When Good Ghouls Go Bad

== See also ==
- Charni Road railway station (AKA Churney Road railway station), a railway station on the Western Line of the Mumbai Suburban Railway
- Cerney (disambiguation)
- Czerny (disambiguation)
