= Cernat =

Cernat may refer to several places in Romania:

- Cernat, a commune in Covasna County
- Cernat, a village in Sopot Commune, Dolj County
- Cernatu, a former village in Brașov County, now part of Săcele city
- Cernat (Bâsca), a tributary of the Bâsca in Buzău County
- Cernat, a tributary of the Durbav in Brașov County
- Cernat, another name for the Mărcușa, a tributary of the Râul Negru in Covasna County
- Cernat (Râul Doamnei), a tributary of the Râul Doamnei in Argeș County

== Other ==
- Cernat (surname)

== See also ==
- Cerna (disambiguation)
