= Żaganiec =

- Village
- Location within Poland
- Coordinates: 51°34′N 15°15′E
- Country: Poland
- Voivodeship: Lubusz
- County: Żagań
- Gmina: Iłowa

Żaganiec [ʐaˈɡaɲɛt͡s] is a village in the administrative district of Gmina Iłowa, within Żagań County, Lubusz Voivodeship, in western Poland.
