= Iłowa Żagańska railway station =

Railway station in south-western Poland

Iłowa Żagańska
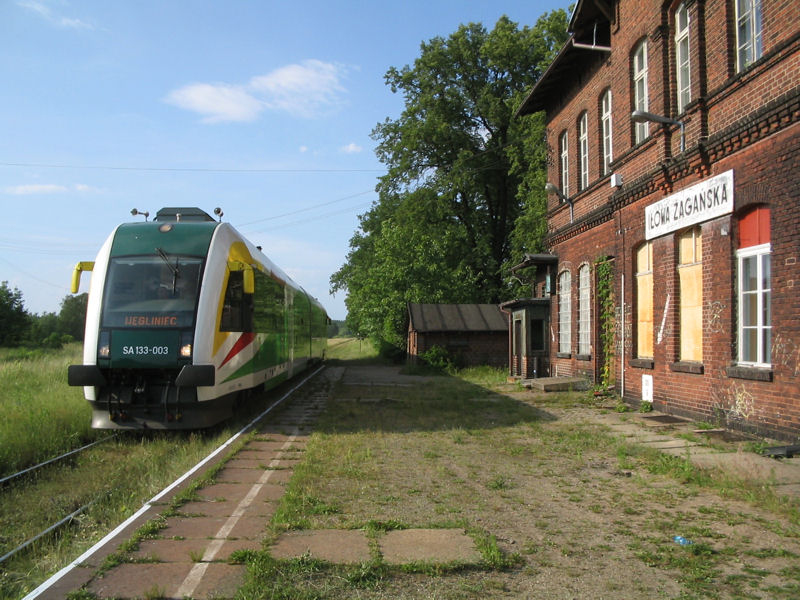
- Railbus SA133 bound for Węgliniec railway station

General information
- Location: Iłowa, Lower Silesian Voivodeship; Poland
- Coordinates: 51°30′07.1″N 15°11′18.1″E
- Owner: Polish State Railways
- Line: Miłkowice–Jasień railway
- Platforms: 1
- Tracks: 1

History
- Opened: 1 September 1846
- Former names: Halbau (1846–1929); Halbau (Schlesien) (1929–1945); Iłowa (1945–1948)

Services
Preceding station	Polregio	Following station
Okrąglica towards Görlitz	PR	Konin Żagański towards Zielona Góra Główna
Location
- Location within Poland

Iłowa Żagańska is a railway station on the Miłkowice–Jasień railway in the town of Iłowa, Żagań County, within the Lubusz Voivodeship in south-western Poland.

== History ==
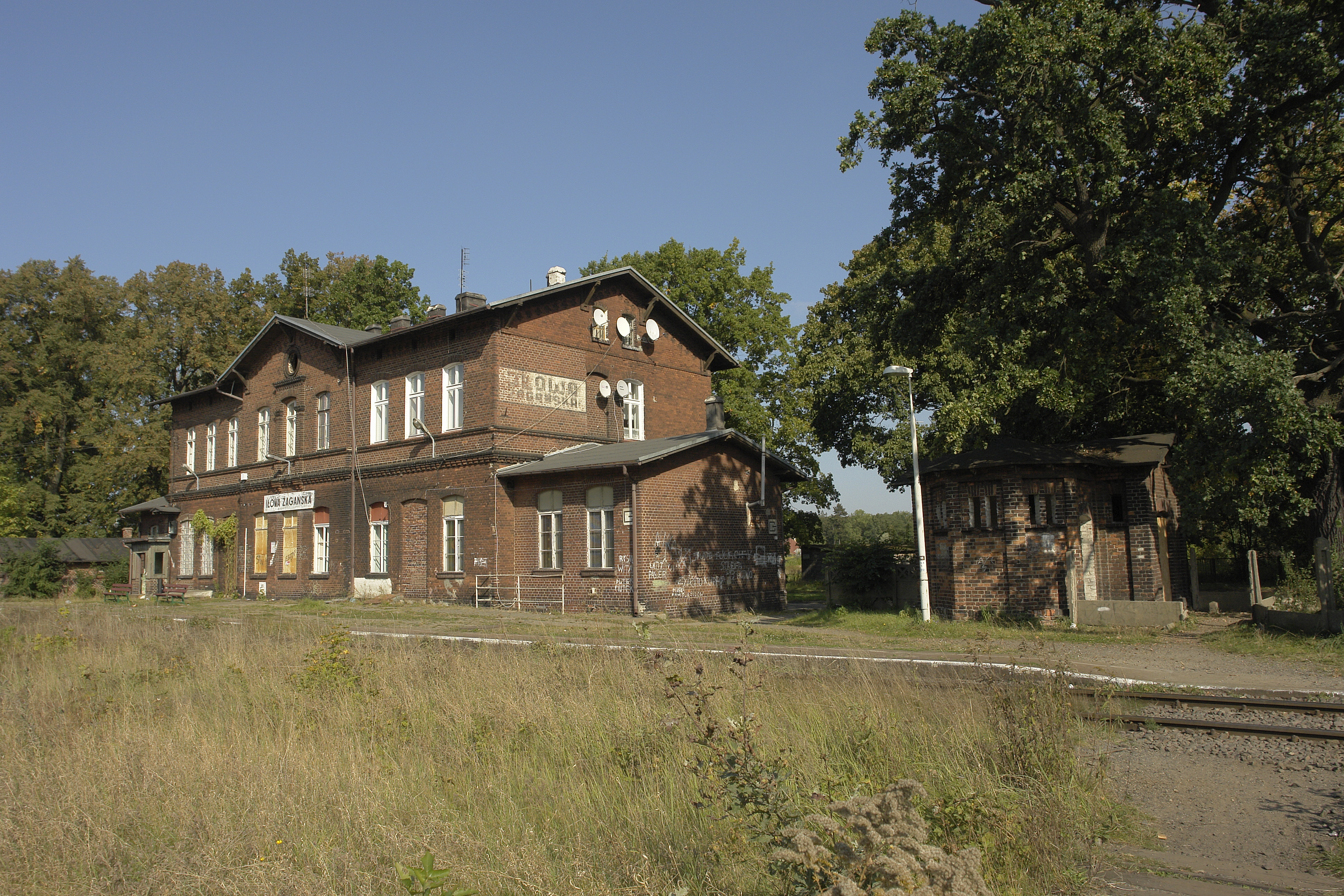
Station building and platform

The station opened in 1846 as Halbau, which was later renamed to Halbau (Schlesien) for designation in 1929. After World War II, the area came under Polish administration. As a result, the station was taken over by Polish State Railways. The station was renamed to Iłowa and later to its modern name, Iłowa Żagańska in 1948.

== Train services ==
The station is served by the following service(s):

- Regional services (R) Görlitz - Żary - Zielona Góra
