= Zygmunt Czerny =

Polish romance philologist

Zygmunt Bronisław Czerny (24 July 1888 – 18 February 1975) was a Polish romance philologist who specialized in the French language.

Before World War II, he was a faculty member at the Lviv University and Academy of Foreign Trade in Lwów. During World War II, he was engaged in the underground education in Poland. After the war, he briefly worked at the Adam Mickiewicz University and University of Wrocław, was one of the initial faculty involved in the creation of the Nicolaus Copernicus University in Toruń, and finally, from 1952, he was a faculty member of the Jagiellonian University in Kraków.

== Selected works ==
- L'esthétique de Louis-Claude De Saint Martin (1920)
- Współczesna wymowa francuska (1920)
- O nowy podział materiału neofilologicznego wobec wprowadzenia 8-letniego kursu nauki (1930)
- O nowy ustrój szkół akademickich (1933)
- Les aventures de Polo: premier livre de français pour la première classe des écoles secondaires (1934, with Feliks Jungman)
- Ogólne problemy reformy studjów wyższych w Polsce (1934)
- Aspects de la France: géographie - histoire - population - institutions - vie économique (1935)
- Bon sourire et en avant: deuxième livre de français (1935, with Feliks Jungman)
- O przyszłe liceum ogólnokształcące (1935)
- Dydaktyka języków nowożytnych (1936)
- Stan badań literackich we Francji po wojnie (1936)
- Hier et aujourd'hui: 3-me livre de français pour la 3-me classe des écoles secondaires (1936, with Feliks Jungman)
- C'est nous la France: 4 livre de Français pour la 4 classe des écoles secondaires (1937, with Feliks Jungman)
- Le génie de la France. 1, Depuis les origines jusqu'à la Grande Révolution: manuel de littérature et de civilisation française pour la première année des lycées (1938, with Feliks Jungman)
- Edward Porębowicz, poeta i uczony (1937)
- Lektura neofilologiczna w szkole średniej a w szczególności francuska (1937)
- Les composants réalistes du Romantisme français (1958)
- Contribution à une théorie comparée du motif dans les arts (1959)
- Francuski wiersz wolny i jego artyzm strukturalny (1960)
