= Charnas (surname) =

Charnas is a surname. Notable people with the surname include:

- Arielle Charnas (born 1987), American online fashion influencer
- Dan Charnas (born 1967), American author, radio host, and record company executive
- Spencer Charnas (fl. 2000–present), American musician, lead singer of the band Ice Nine Kills
- Suzy McKee Charnas (1939–2023), American novelist
