= Crna =

Crna or CRNA may refer to:

- Centre en route de la navigation aérienne, air traffic control centres across France
- Črna na Koroškem, a municipality in Slovenia
- Cost-related nonadherence to medications, see Medication costs for a related article
- Certified Registered Nurse Anesthetist, an advanced practice nurse with expertise in anesthesia in the United States
- cRNA, RNA derived from cDNA through standard RNA synthesis
- Center for Resilient Networks and Applications, a research institution in Oslo, Norway

== See also ==
- Crna Reka (disambiguation)
- Crna Bara (disambiguation)
