= Center for Resilient Networks and Applications =

Center for Resilient Networks and Applications, CRNA. is owned by Simula Metropolitan Center for Digital Engineering. The center was established in 2014 as a response to modern society's increasing dependability on applications running on top of the Internet and the serious societal consequences of outages. CRNA is a culmination of earlier research undertaken between 2006 and 2014 in projects called Resilient Networks and Resilient Networks II.

The center receives its base funding from the Norwegian government, initially from the Ministry of Transport and Communications but has from 2019 been moved under the Ministry of Digitalisation.

CRNA's mandate includes operating a country-wide infrastructure for monitoring the reliability and performance of mobile networks, the NorNet Edge. So far seven annual reports have been published tracking the evolution of Norwegian mobile operators and highlighting points with scope for improvements.

The research undertaken at CRNA is informing the Norwegian Government's policy on communications infrastructure, and the importance of the work is expressed in the Government's Digital agenda.
