= Mike Chernoff =

Mike Chernoff may refer to:

- Mike Chernoff (baseball), American baseball general manager of the Cleveland Indians
- Mike Chernoff (curler), Canadian curler and geologist
- Mike Chernoff (ice hockey) (1946–2011), ice hockey left winger
