= Hofmann & Czerny (Hofmann-Wien) =

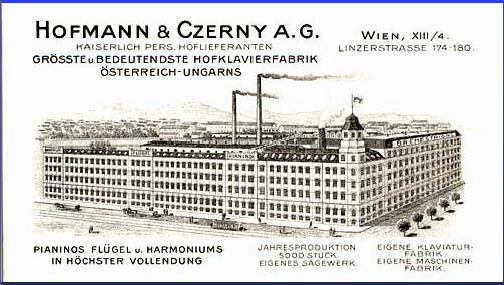
Hofmann & Czerny A. G. Factory in Vienna

Hofmann & Czerny AG [not to be confused with other piano makers such as Ferdinand Hofmann (ca. 1756–1829), August Hoffmann, George Hoffmann, W. Hoffmann, Karl Hofmann, Hofmann & Scholz or Hofmann & Schulze] was founded in 1903 by Julius Carl Hofmann (b. 1873, Bohemia. d. 1948, Vienna) in Penzing (Vienna) and was known as Europe's largest piano manufacturer at the time. It was awarded the Austrian coat of arms on June 11, 1931, as it used to be the imperial court's personal piano supplier. The company produced and sold world famous pianos under the name "Hofmann" and later as "Hofmann & Czerny". The company began producing pianos in its factory under license in 1924. The pianos were also produced in Czechoslovakia under "Jihlavská továrna, a.s." generated under license.

Towards the end of the 19th and the beginning of the 20th century, many Austria-Hungary companies tried to compete in the enormous success of the German piano orchestrions with their own products. In 1913 Hofmann developed an orchestrion after taking steps towards the cinema organ. The Hofmann & Czerny piano company with the “Continental” brand, in contrast to other smaller brands at the time such as the Stingl brothers used to be a leader in the orchestrion instrument in the Austria-Hungary empire.

Isabella Sommer writes in the article The piano playing instrument Phonola :

“The largest piano factory in Vienna, Hofmann & Czerny (…) not only produced pianos, but also music machines and orchestras with 'military music', which had been installed in inns and cafes before the war. From September 1914 ammunition boxes were built here instead of pianos, but the music vending machines were used even more efficiently because the company set up a 'mighty musical work' on the tower of their factory site, which performed the Prinz-Eugen-Lied every evening at 8 a.m., the watch on the Rhine, the imperial song, “Hail you in the wreath, My Austria, the Radetzky and the Rákóczi march. The music can be heard in wide areas and is enthusiastically received everywhere.”

The two most popular pianos sold were the Hofmann 7 octaves grand piano MOD XV (later Hofmann & Czerny M15) with double escapement mechanisms from Renner and the Belcanto 7 ¼ upright piano with the novel and additional harpsichord sound when the middle pedal is held down. The combination of Renner's piano action and Hofmann & Czerny's affordable shell made the instrument one of the most popular in Europe at the time. Production ceased in 1963, however the company is now run by Hans Helmut Dittmer, the grandson of Hans Suchy who was a former colleague of Hofmann's.

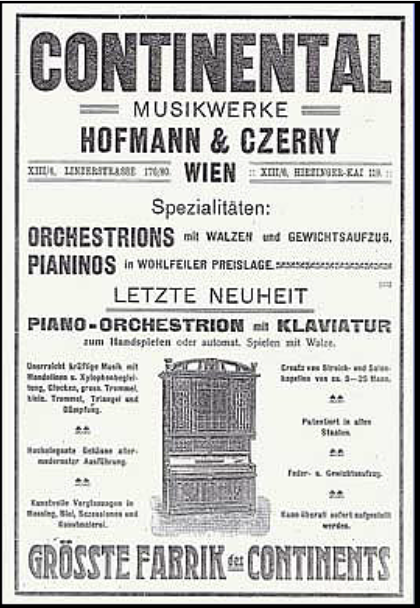
Hofmann Continental orchestrion
