= Černá u Bohdanče =

- Municipality
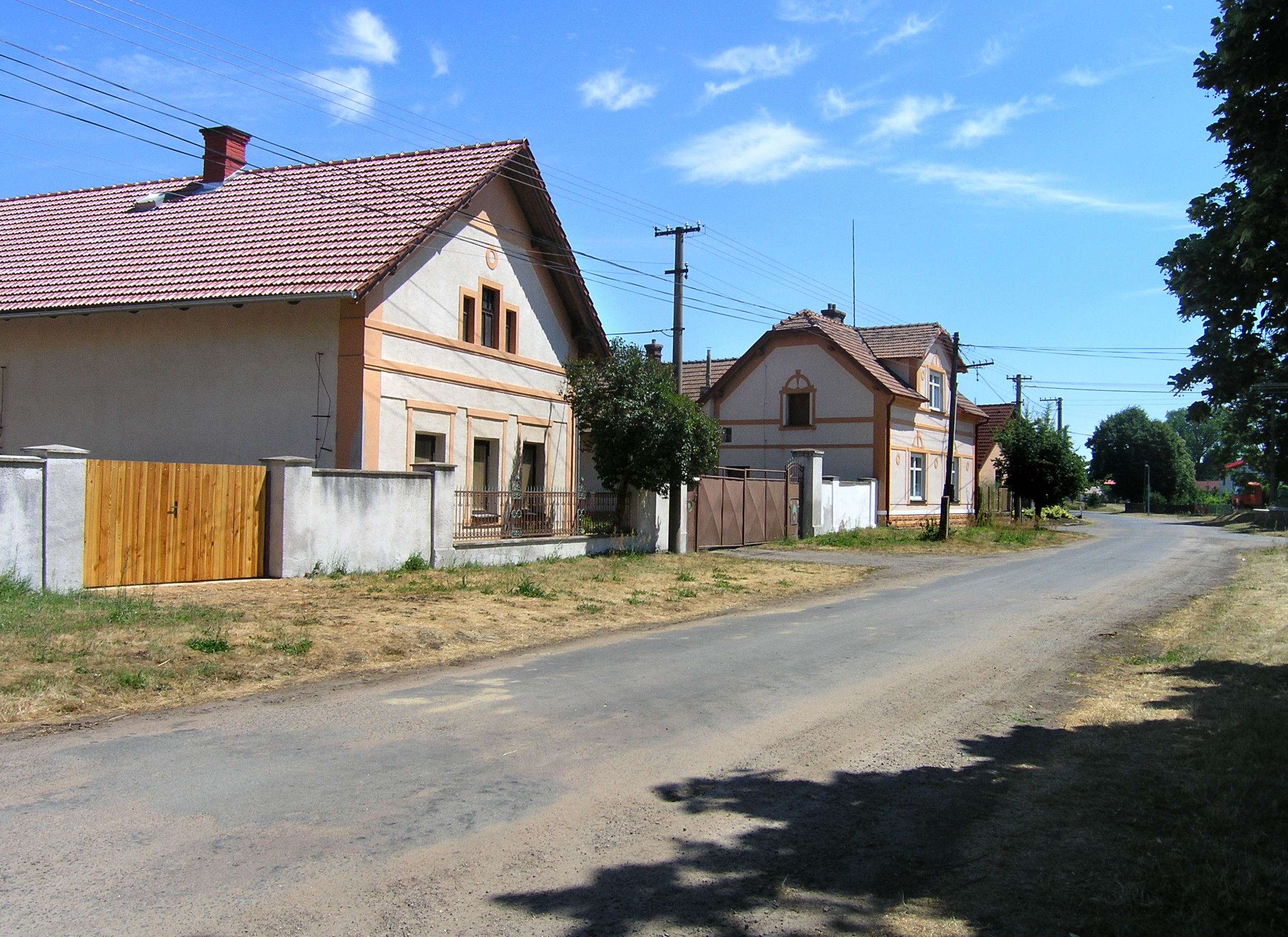
- Western part of the village

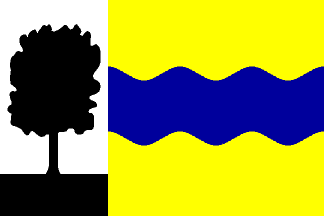
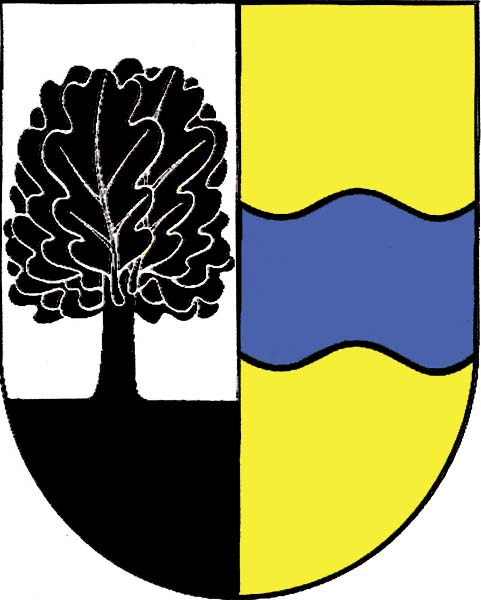
- Flag Coat of arms

- Location in the Czech Republic
- Coordinates: 50°3′22″N 15°40′19″E
- Country: Czech Republic
- Region: Pardubice
- District: Pardubice
- First mentioned: 1377

Area
  - Total: 2.65 km^{2} (1.02 sq mi)
- Elevation: 213 m (699 ft)

Population (2026-01-01)
  - Total: 733
  - Density: 277/km^{2} (716/sq mi)
- Time zone: UTC+1 (CET)
  - Summer (DST): UTC+2 (CEST)
- Postal code: 533 41
- Website: www.cerna-u-bohdance.cz

Černá u Bohdanče (German: Czerna bei Bohdanetsch) is a municipality and village in Pardubice District in the Pardubice Region of the Czech Republic. It has about 700 inhabitants.

== Demographics ==
Historical population
Year	Pop.	±%
1869	261	—
1880	262	+0.4%
1890	271	+3.4%
1900	251	−7.4%
1910	243	−3.2%
1921	236	−2.9%
1930	236	+0.0%
1950	194	−17.8%
1961	201	+3.6%
1970	211	+5.0%
1980	217	+2.8%
1991	224	+3.2%
2001	256	+14.3%
2011	341	+33.2%
2021	688	+101.8%
Source: Censuses
