= Charna Furman =

Uruguayan architect

- Born: Jaie Charna Furman Naidich; 12 December 1941; Montevideo, Uruguay
- Occupation: architect

Charna Furman (born 12 December 1941) is a Uruguayan architect noted for her design of a communal women's housing project designed to create affordable housing for single mothers. As a prisoner, confined during the Uruguayan Dictatorship, she has become an advocate for people deprived of their civil liberties and participated in the creation of a film regarding her ordeal.

== Early life ==
Jaie Charna Furman Naidich was born on 12 December 1941, in Montevideo, Uruguay, to Jaie Naidich and José Furman. She grew up in her maternal grandparents home and was raised in a traditional Jewish family. Her father's family had fled to Uruguay to escape the Holocaust. Entering architecture studies at the University of the Republic in 1961, she became involved in the work of the Center of Architecture Students (Spanish: Centro de Estudiantes de Arquitectura, CEDA) and the Federation of University Students, attending numerous international conferences. In 1968, she joined the Culture Commission and was also involved in the communist youth movement, before graduating in 1973.

== Career ==
Furman joined the faculty of the university as a research assistant in the Climatology Department in 1968 and worked there until her termination for political activism in 1974 after the 1973 Uruguayan coup d'état. Though inactive in leftist groups since her university days, Furman was considered a leftist because of her previous involvement. She and her husband, who worked as a drafter in a furniture company, opened a small decorating boutique filled with craft items. At the end of October, she and her husband were arrested in the middle of the night, though her children were allowed to leave with her mother. She was imprisoned from October 1975 to February 1980 and routinely tortured the first year for her previous communist involvement. She was also subject to anti-Semitic slurs and refused access to food to meet her dietetic restrictions or Jewish literature. After a year, she was moved to the Punta de Rieles Prison, where she remained until her release. At the time of her imprisonment, Furman was a young mother with two children, Alejandro, who was four years old and Aiala, who was two and a half years old.

In 1985, Furman resumed her post as a research assistant with the responsibility of managing housing projects for targeted groups to alleviate poverty and marginalization. After a group of single mothers began to work with social workers and psychologists in 1989 to express some of the difficulties they found in locating safe housing for their families, Furman began planning a project known as Mujeres Jefas de Familia (Women as Head of Families), or colloquially as MUJEFA. The plan for the project, implemented by the city, involved the renovation of a derelict historic property in the city center, into a communal living space for twelve families, but it took four years before the deed to the property was granted. The women began working to clean the property in 1994 to prepare for the construction, which was completed in May 1997. The large house featured three common courtyards, which were retained for the use of the residents and the remaining large rooms were divided into residential apartments. Furman's project was one of the finalists for the 1995 World Habitat Prize, awarded by the Building and Social Housing Foundation of the United Kingdom and was recognized by other competitions in Argentina and Dubai.

Furman was one of the International Habitat Council's Women's Network, which she joined in 1992 and a founder of the Housing Institute for Women (Spanish: Instituto de Vivienda para la Mujer, IVIM) in 1994. She became president of the IVIM in 1996 and that same year, joined the United Nations Conference on Women's Monitoring Commission on Gender and Poverty. In 1997, Furman began working on several neighborhood improvement projects for the Municipal Commissariat of Montevideo (Spanish: Intendencia Municipal de Montevideo, IMM), the Women's commission of the Federation of Housing Cooperatives (Spanish: Federación de Cooperativas de Vivienda, FECOVI) and the IVIM. These included the Cooperatives Covisfran, Covipolo, Entrelunas, Olimar and Piramide, which involved gendered spaces and solutions for working women like childcare, safety and micro-enterprise programs.

In 2001, Furman was appointed by the architecture faculty of the University of the Republic to the Thematic Network of Gender Studies. In addition to her urban planning initiatives, Furman taught graduate courses on housing issues, such as designing for low-income sectors, cooperatives and use of alternative technology and recycling to solve social housing challenges and published books and articles on urban housing solutions. Some of her works included Mujefa ya tiene casa: un proyecto piloto y sus impactos en el Uruguay (MUJEFA has home: a pilot project and its impacts in Uruguay, 1996), Soluciones habitacionales para personas adultas mayores (Housing solutions for older adults, 1997), Políticas de vivienda y hábitat. Las necesidades de las mujeres y de los nuevos arreglos familiares siguen sin ser contemplados (Housing and habitat policies: The needs of women and new family arrangements remain unseen, 2000), and Nuevas ecuaciones sociales. Como responden las políticas habitacionales (New social equations: How housing policies respond, 2007).

Retiring in 2004 from the university, Furman became involved in the commission investigating resistance to the dictatorship and served on various neighborhood councils beginning in 2007. She was one of the participants in the creation of a 2005 documentary, Memorias de Mujeres (Memories of Women), directed by Virginia Martínez, which detailed the experiences of women imprisoned during the dictatorship. To survive, the women formed support groups and lived in a communal style to protect each other from their thoughts of suicide, sexual assault, and violence.
