= Ruth Cernea =

American anthropologist

Ruth Fredman Cernea (1934 – March 31, 2009) was an American cultural anthropologist, who dedicated virtually all her field research and writings to the analysis of Jewish culture and symbols, in various settings.

== Biography ==
Born in Philadelphia in 1934, Ruth Fredman Cernea (née Gruber) got her BA degree in English literature from Temple University, created and raised a family, and returned to Temple University to complete her graduate studies. After gaining a doctorate in cultural anthropology, she became the Director for Publications and Research at the national headquarters of the Hillel Foundation for Jewish Campus Life (national headquarters).

Previous positions include:

- Director of Research and Publications (1982–96) of the Hillel Foundation
- Chief Editor of the multiyear guide “Jewish Life on Campus”
- President of the Washington Association of Professional Anthropologists (WAPA), 2001–02

== Key publications ==
The monograph “The Passover Seder: Afikoman in Exile – An Anthropological Perspective on Jewish Culture” (1980) established Ruth Fredman Cernea as a subtle interpreter of Jewish cultural and religious symbols, and of popular myths. She argued that the symbolism embedded in the Passover ritual expresses the political celebration of freedom and the cultural quest for purity. Published in several editions, the book remains in print as the only systematic anthropological examination of Passover's religious and secular symbols. Interested in the cultural transformation of Jewish immigrants in the US, she devoted five years to research among Jewish immigrants from North Africa living in Washington DC, the result of which was her thesis on "Cosmopolitans at Home: The Sephardic Jews of Washington D.C.2 (1982).

As noted by the Washington Post, "Dr. Cernea was on her second honeymoon in 1987 when she discovered a little-known Jewish community in Myanmar (Burma) and the country’s only synagogue, the historic Mushmeah Yeshua Temple." That discovery spurred her enduring interest and she devoted almost 20 years to research and piece together the history of Burma's Jewish community, a thriving pre-World War II community decimated by the war and numbering now only a handful of people. To reconstruct that community's history and culture, Cernea traveled to all places where small groups of descendants of Burma's Jewish community are known to live: India, Australia, Israel, United Kingdom, and California, interviewing scores of families of Jewish Burmese ancestry and gathering family histories, documents, pictures, diaries, and personal recollections. Her tenacity salvaged from oblivion and reconstructed the history of Burma's Jewish community in the only existing monograph on that community, Almost Englishmen: Baghdadi Jews in British Burma (2007).

Cernea's interest for culture produced another unique work, entitled The Great Latke-Hamantash Debate (2006). That is an anthology of selected speeches delivered by Jewish and non-Jewish scholars in a long series of mock debates started at the University of Chicago more than half a century ago and continuing today through debates organized in many universities across the United States and Canada, as well as in a number of synagogues.

The book includes mock "scholarly arguments" delivered in live public contests between "supporters" of the Latke, the potato pancake traditionally served during the holiday of Hanukkah, and "supporters" of the Hamatasch, the triangular sweet pastry associated with the holiday of Purim. Among the presenters in her book are some of the most eminent American academics, including Milton Friedman and Leon Lederman, both Nobel laureates respectively in economics and physics, historian Hana Grey, philosopher Martha Nussbaum, and some other 30 scholars. These debaters construct the most absurd possible arguments to demonstrate the alleged superiority of the Latke or the Hamatasch vis-à-vis each other. The book is credited with the recent multiplication of the annual Latke-Hamatasch humorous debates across the US. In a nice turn of phrase, Dr. Cernea told the Chicago Tribune in 2005 that "Jewish humor is not silly, but it is absurd absurdity. In Jewish thought absurdity and humor is particularly an antidote to seriousness. Jews have always been able to use humor to lighten the load."
