= Adalbert Czerny =

Austrian pediatrician

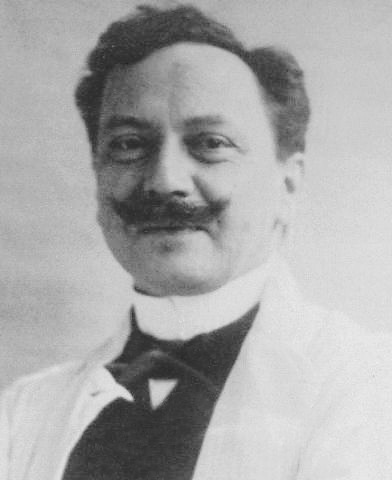
- Adalbert Czerny in 1904
- Born: 25 March 1863; Szczakowa, part of Jaworzno, Poland (then Austrian Galicia)
- Died: 3 October 1941 (aged 78); Berlin
- Occupation: Pediatrician
- Known for: Discovery and description of several children's diseases

Adalbert Czerny (25 March 1863 – 3 October 1941) was an Austrian pediatrician. He is considered one of the founders of modern pediatrics and played a pivotal role in reducing child mortality. Several children's diseases were named after him.

== Education and career ==
Son of a railway engineer, Czerny grew up in Vienna and as of 1879 in Pilsen, where he passed his Abitur exam in 1882. He took up medical studies at the German Charles University in Prague. He graduated with his doctoral thesis on kidney disease in 1888 and took up clinical work as an assistant to Alois Epstein (1849–1918) at the "Findelanstalt" (hospital for foundlings), which was part of the Prague University Hospital.

In 1893, after his habilitation treatise on glycogen and amaloid disorder and an appertaining lecture on the nutrition of newborns he received two offers for chairs of pediatrics in Innsbruck and Breslau.He opted for Breslau and worked there until 1910.
In 1906 he was offered a position as full professor for pediatrics in Munich, but he declined it and as a reward was made personal full professor at the Breslau University including a considerable raise of his salary.

He accepted the chair of pediatrics in the new Children's Hospital in Strassburg in 1910, where he worked until 1913, when he became the successor of Otto Heubner as full professor for pediatrics at the Berlin Charité. There he worked for the next 19 years and – amongst other achievements – founded the international School of Pediatrics.

As professor emeritus he accepted a chair for pediatrics at the Medical Academy in Düsseldorf, where he temporarily was head of the local Children's Hospital from 1934 to 1936.
Czerny was married and had one son Marianus (1896 –1985), who was a full professor for experimental physics in Frankfurt from 1938 to 1961.

Czerny died on 3 October 1941 in Berlin and was buried in Pilsen.

== Achievements as co-founder of modern pediatrics ==
The school founded by Czerny was mainly concerned with nutrition physiology and metabolic pathology of neonates. During his time of work at the Berlin University Children's Hospital he carried on with research work on infant mortality, a subject to which Heubner had given a scientific foundation. Together with his pupil and colleague Arthur Keller (1868–1934) he summarized the results of his Breslau work in 1906 in a two-volume manual "Des Kindes Ernährung, Ernährungsstörungen und Ernährungstherapie" (Children's nutrition, nutritional disturbance and therapeutic nutrition) – among experts simply known as the „Czerny–Keller“. Further editions were published in 1917 and 1928.

This was a foundational work for the development of modern pediatrics. Czerny's term disorder of nutrition implied the relationship between nutrition and disease. Czerny furthermore distinguished three groups of damage: (a) due to nutrition, (b) due to infection and (c) due to physical constitution.

A second emphasis in his research work was the correlation between nutritional disturbance and the behaviour of the child. His repeatedly re-edited collection of lectures of 1908 "Der Arzt als Erzieher" ("The physician as an educator") demonstrated this pedgogical approach.

== Discoverer of new clinical symptoms in pediatrics ==
Children's diseases such as

- nutritional anemia in neonates (Czerny anemia)
- lymphatic−exudative diathesis (Czerny diathesis), a clinical entity, which Czerny clearly distinguished from scrofula and consequently from tuberculosis What he described is an individual disposition to increased sensitivity of the skin and the mucus.
- paradoxical respiration (Czerny respiration, German: Czerny-Atmung)

== Acknowledgements and posthumous honours ==
The German Association of Children's and Juvenile Medicine (Deutsche Gesellschaft für Kinder- und Jugendmedizin – DGKJ), which was founded in 1883, annually awards the "Adalbert-Czerny Preis" (Adalbert Czerny Award). The award was started in 1963 (the 100th anniversary of Czerny' birth) and goes to persons with outstanding scientific achievements in pediatrics.

== Bibliography (selection of German publications) ==
- Adalbert Czerny & Keller, Arthur: Des Kindes Ernährung, Ernährungsstörungen und Ernährungstherapie: 2 vols. Newest edition Leipzig 1928
- Adalbert Czerny: Der Arzt als Erzieher des Kindes, 6. ed. Leipzig 1922
- Adalbert Czerny: Die Entstehung und Bedeutung der Angst im Leben des Kindes, Langensalza 1915

== Literature and footnotes ==
- Wolfgang U. Eckart & Christoph Gradman: Ärzte-Lexikon Springer, 3. ed. Heidelberg 2006 p. 90 ISBN 978-3-540-29584-6
- Rolf Schmoeger: Adalbert Czerny (1863–1941) Mitbegründer der wissenschaftlichen Kinderheilkunde Berlin 2003 ISBN 978-3-937343-36-5 = Schmoeger (2003) (note: this book has no proper page numbering, but contains a number of interesting illustrations)
- Hans Kleinschmidt: Zum siebzigsten Geburtstage von Adalbert Czerny am 25. März 1933 in: Klinische Wochenschrift 12 (1933) p. 486f. also available as PDF-File
