= Cherney =

Cherney is a Yiddish/Hebrew-language surname (Hebrew: צ'רנוי) derived from Russian word Чёрный (chyorny/cherny) meaning "black". Notable people with the surname include:

- Al Cherney, Canadian fiddler
- Brian Cherney (born 1942), Canadian composer
- Darryl Cherney (born 1956), American musician and environmental activist
- Ed Cherney, American recording engineer and record producer
- Lawrence Cherney (born 1946), Canadian oboist
- Michael Cherney (born 1952), Uzbek-born Israeli entrepreneur and industrialist

== See also ==
- Cheney (surname)
- Chesney
