= Elvire de Cerny =

Elvire-Louise-Léonarde de Preissac, comtesse de Cerny, known as Elvire de Cerny (1818–1899) was a French writer and folklorist.

She lived near Dinan for many years and wrote about Breton folklore in local newspapers. Her book Contes et légendes de Bretagne (1856-1898) was published in 1899 (helped by François Duine) and reprinted several times, including in 1995. Her 1861 work Saint-Suliac et ses traditions : contes et légendes d'Ille-et-Vilaine was reprinted in 1987. The Breton folklorist Paul Sébillot is said to have called her "la doyenne du folklore français".

She was a proponent of the theory that Napoleon was not born in Corsica but in Brittany, where he was allegedly baptised in the church of Sainte-Sève.

== Selected publications ==
- Cerny, Elvire de (1899). Contes et légendes de Bretagne (1856-1898). Paris: Émile Lechevalier. (reprinted 1995, Rennes: La Tourniole)
- Cerny, Elvire de (1861). Saint-Suliac et ses traditions : contes et légendes d'Ille-et-Vilaine. (reprinted 1987, Rennes:Rue des Scribes)
