= Marianus Czerny =

German experimental physicist

Marianus Czerny (17 February 1896 – 10 September 1985) was a German experimental physicist who focused on molecular spectroscopy, especially infrared spectroscopy. He was Professor at Johann Wolfgang Goethe-University in Frankfurt.

== Early life and education ==
He was the son of the pediatrician Adalbert Czerny, his mother was the daughter of a large landowner in Upper Silesia. He attended high school in Strasbourg and later achieved the rank of lieutenant in the Guards Infantry.

His left elbow was shot through in 1916 during World War I. From 1918 he studied at the Albert Ludwigs University in Freiburg and then at the University of Berlin. In 1923 he received his doctorate in Berlin with a dissertation in infrared physics entitled Über eine neue Form der Rubensschen Reststrahlmethode (On a new form of Rubens' residual beam method), which he began under Heinrich Rubens and which was supervised by Gerhard Hettner after his death.

== Career ==
He then became an assistant at the Physics Institute. Czerny attracted attention at the time when, following the Stern-Gerlach experiment (1922), which demonstrated the existence of half-integer quantum numbers in electron spin, he also found them in the rotation bands of molecules (gaseous hydrogen halides). His subsequent study of the rotation bands on alkali halide crystals (with R. Bowling Barnes, C. H. Cartwright) provided the first evidence of what were later described as multiphonon effects.

In 1927 he earned his habilitation and in 1934 he became an associate professor in Berlin (as the successor Peter Pringsheim, who was dismissed by the Nazi regime), but left after the institute in Berlin was switched to military research due to the change in leadership from Walther Nernst to Erich Schumann and the scientific environment deteriorated due to confidentiality regulations.

In 1938 he became a professor for experimental physics to Frankfurt and became director of the physical institute there. His predecessor Karl Wilhelm Meissner, who wanted to bring Czerny to Frankfurt in 1934, had previously been dismissed there by the National Socialists. Initially, Czerny had to pay for the equipment for infrared spectroscopy out of his own pocket, since the institute in Frankfurt had previously operated optical spectroscopy. During the Second World War, his institute was largely destroyed by bombing raids. After the war, in 1947, he spent six months in military research for the US Navy in California. After the war he led the slow reconstruction of the Physics Institute and retired in 1961. However, Czerny worked until 1976 in the internship for beginners.

In 1966 he received an honorary doctorate in Göttingen.

=== Research ===
Czerny continued the research of the infrared spectral range from (under Rubens) to 300 microns wavelength up to about 1400 microns by developing new measuring methods and apparatuses begun by his teacher Rubens. During his time in Berlin, he was also known for his work with A. F. Turner and the doctoral student V. Plettig on astigmatism in mirror spectrometers. He dealt with thermal limits of measurement (which was by no means common knowledge in the 1920s), techniques of infrared photography (evaporography) and, in World War II, sensitivity of the eye to high-intensity infrared (important in why Allied bomber crews apparently used the infrared - could detect anti-aircraft headlights). The insensitivity to infrared is an adaptation of the visual system to the thermal radiation of one's own blood, as Czerny showed in 1949. In 1972 he published a paper on changes in the optics and vision of the eye after cataract surgery (e.g. greater sensitivity in the ultraviolet). After World War II he published on lightweight bolometers, the beginnings of the later alternating light process. He also dealt with application problems in the glass industry (heat conduction by radiation).

== Personal life ==
In his spare time he played the cello and made music with Albert Einstein and Max Planck during his time in Berlin.

Czerny married Octavia Gaupp in 1934.

== Death ==
He died in a retirement home in Munich.

== General references ==
- L. Genzel, W. Martienssen, H. A. Müser: Marianus Czerny zum Gedenken, Phys. Blätter, Band 41, 1985, S. 385
- G. Hettner, Marianus Czerny 60 Jahre, Phys. Blätter, Februar 1956
- Ludwig Genzel: Marianus Czerny zum 80. Geburtstag: Lieber Herr Czerny !, Phys. Blätter, Band 37, Februar 1981
