= Černá v Pošumaví =

- Municipality
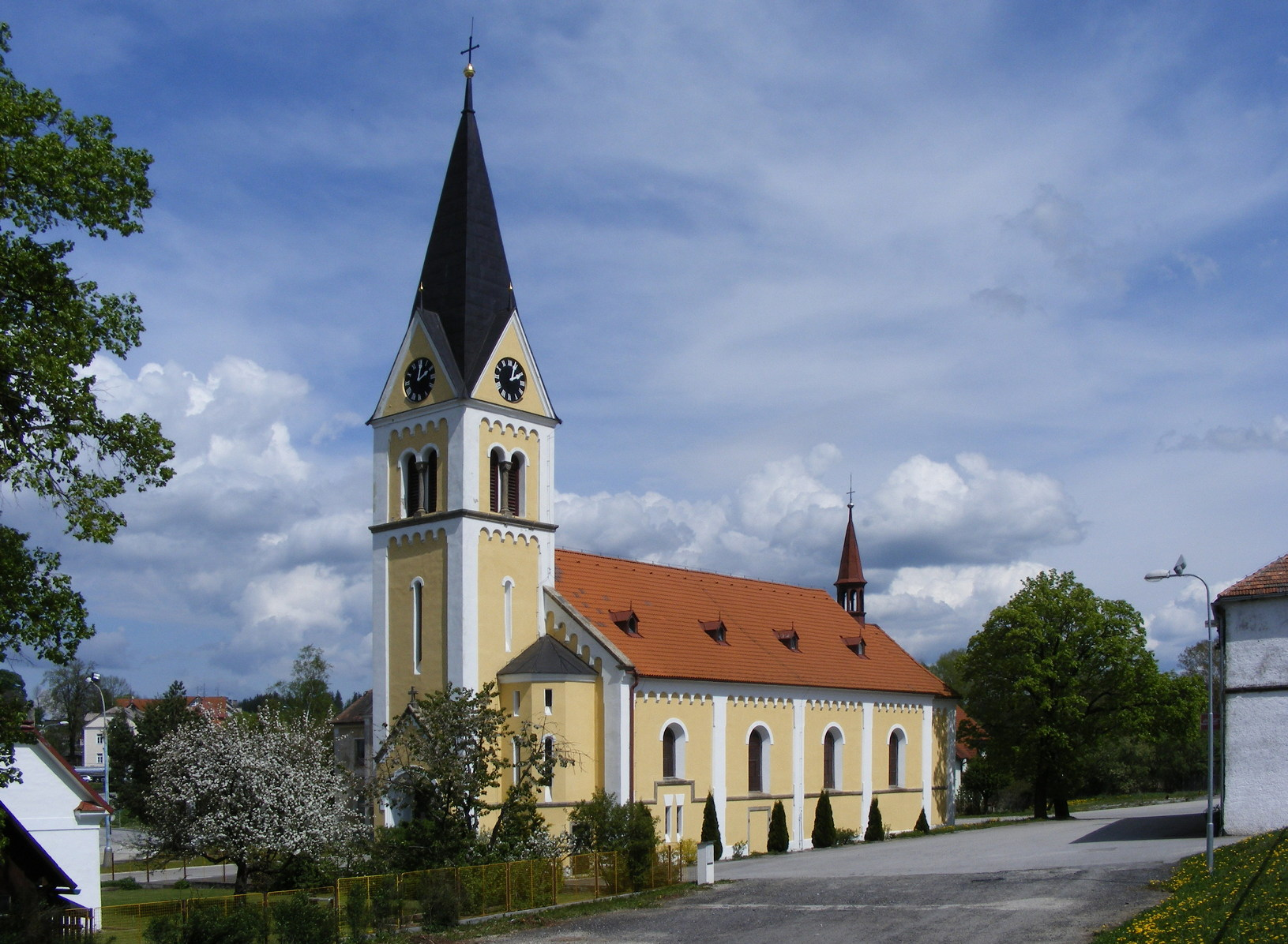
- Church of the Immaculate Conception

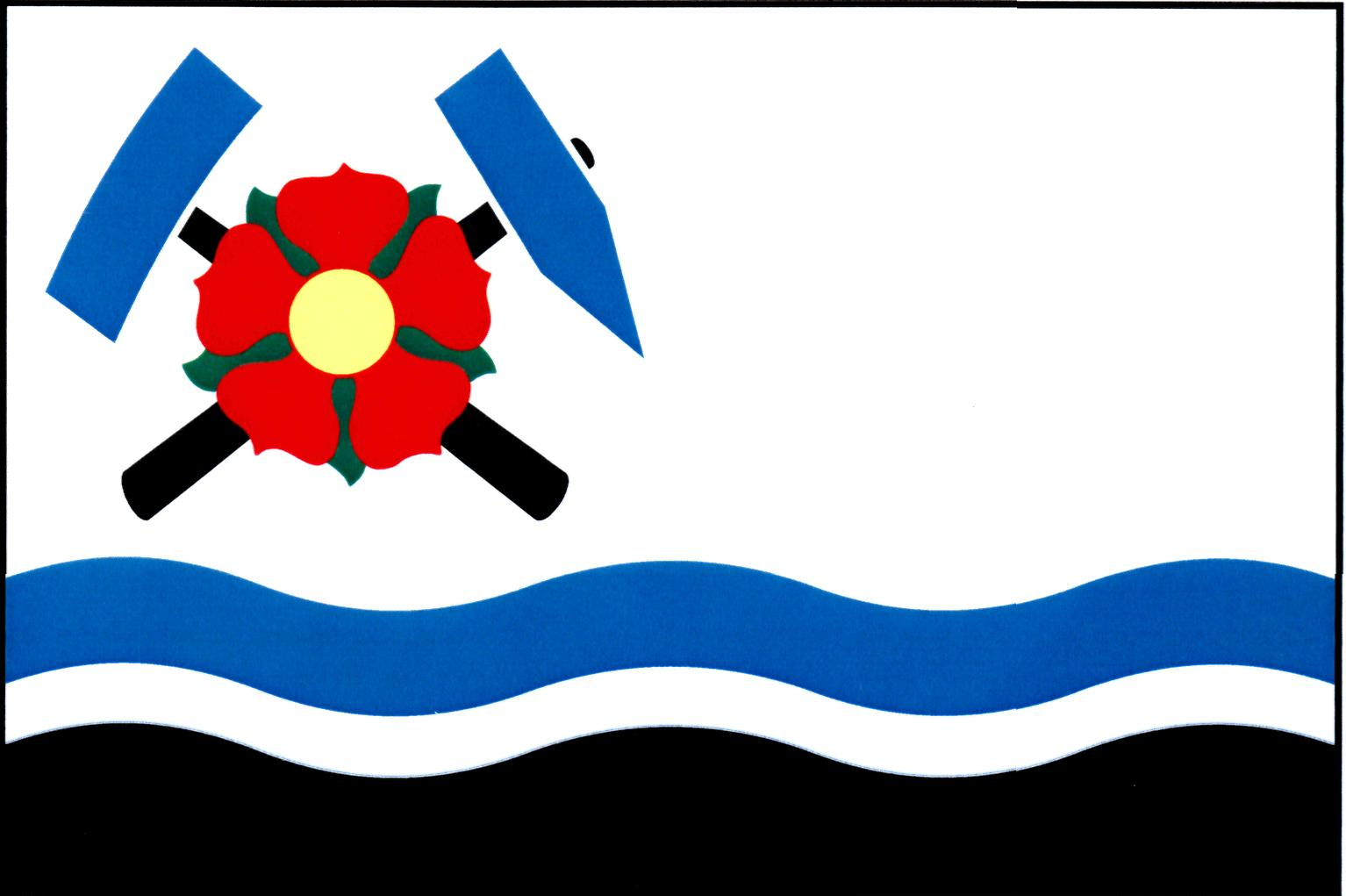
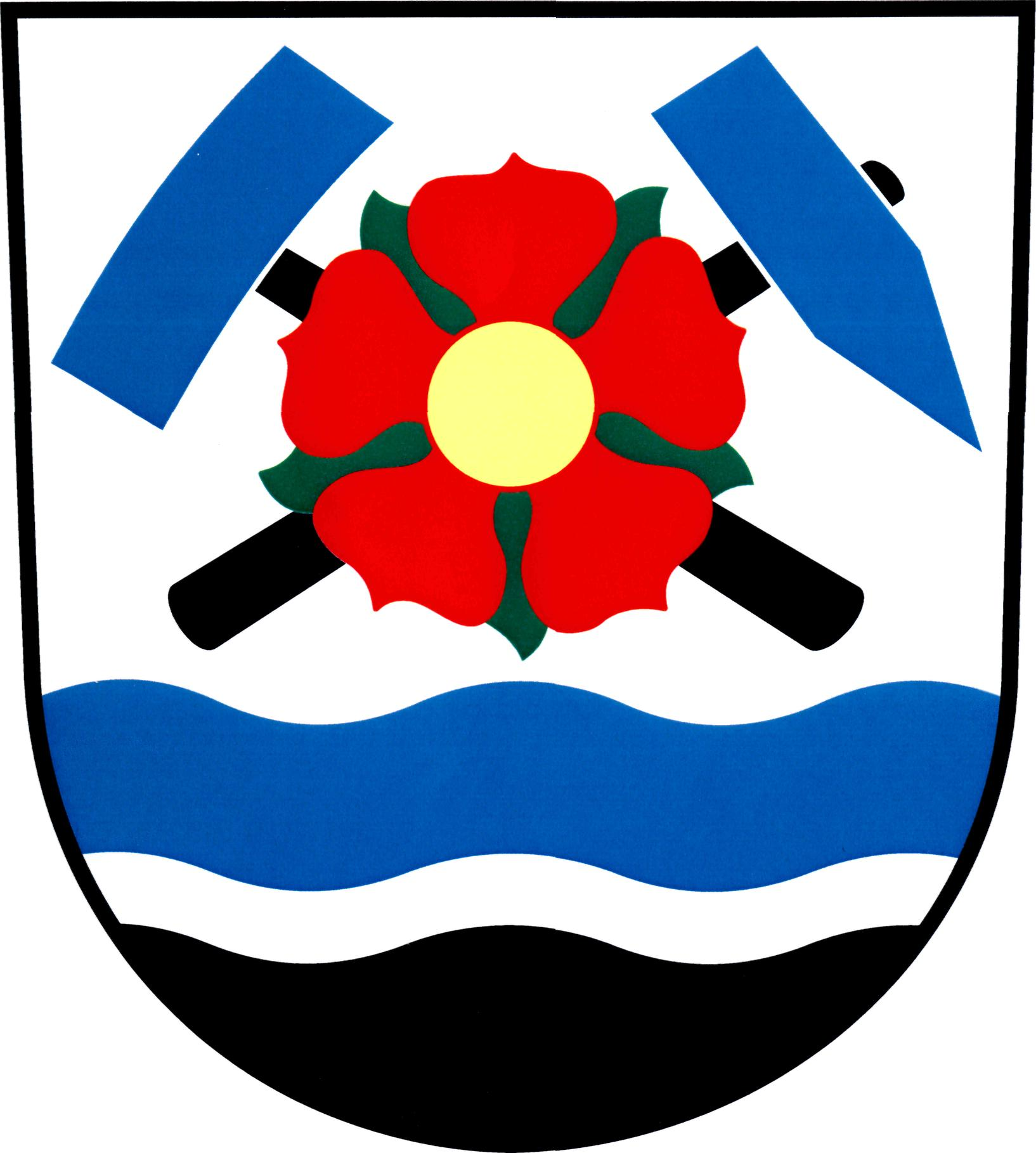
- Flag Coat of arms

- Location in the Czech Republic
- Coordinates: 48°44′17″N 14°06′38″E
- Country: Czech Republic
- Region: South Bohemian
- District: Český Krumlov
- First mentioned: 1268

Area
  - Total: 50.47 km^{2} (19.49 sq mi)
- Elevation: 728 m (2,388 ft)

Population (2026-01-01)
  - Total: 828
  - Density: 16.4/km^{2} (42.5/sq mi)
- Time zone: UTC+1 (CET)
  - Summer (DST): UTC+2 (CEST)
- Postal codes: 382 23, 382 26
- Website: www.cernavposumavi.cz

Černá v Pošumaví (until 1950 Černá; German: Schwarzbach) is a municipality and village in Český Krumlov District in the South Bohemian Region of the Czech Republic. It has about 800 inhabitants. It is a popular summer resort.

== Administrative division ==
Černá v Pošumaví consists of six municipal parts (in brackets population according to the 2021 census):

- Černá v Pošumaví (615)
- Bližná (89)
- Dolní Vltavice (15)
- Mokrá (25)
- Muckov (33)
- Plánička (12)

== Etymology ==
The Czech name Černá (i.e. 'black') and the historical German name Schwarzbach (i.e. 'black stream') were derived from the stream that flowed below the village. The oldest forms of the name was Natschernerece (literally 'on the black river') and Nachirnie. In 1483, the name Czerna first appeared. From 1530, the name Schwarzbach was used in various forms.

== Geography ==
Černá v Pošumaví is located about 17 km (11 mi) southwest of Český Krumlov and 36 km (22 mi) southwest of České Budějovice. The municipal territory borders Germany in the southwest. It lies in the Bohemian Forest. The highest point is a nameless hill at 862 m (2,828 ft) above sea level. The municipality is situated on the shore of the Lipno Reservoir.

== History ==
The first written mention of Černá v Pošumaví is in the donation deed of King Ottokar II from 1268, who gave the village to his burgrave Hirzo of Klingenberg.

After 1945, some formerly independent municipalities in the territory of today's Černá v Pošumaví were liquidated due to the expulsion of the German population and the modification of the border zone, and partly also due to the construction of the Lipno Reservoir.

=== Graphite mining ===
The first records of the mining of graphite date from the 1760s. Graphite mines were opened by the Schwarzenbergs in 1812. Ink was used for the production of pencils in the Zlatá Koruna and in České Budějovice at the Koh-i-Noor Hardtmuth company. Most of the graphite deposits were flooded by the reservoir.

== Demographics ==
Historical population

Year	Pop.	±%
1869	2,145	—
1880	2,358	+9.9%
1890	2,522	+7.0%
1900	2,672	+5.9%
1910	2,915	+9.1%

Year	Pop.	±%
1921	2,745	−5.8%
1930	2,631	−4.2%
1950	711	−73.0%
1961	750	+5.5%
1970	845	+12.7%

Year	Pop.	±%
1980	807	−4.5%
1991	798	−1.1%
2001	826	+3.5%
2011	802	−2.9%
2021	789	−1.6%

Source: Censuses

== Transport ==
The I/39 road (the section from Český Krumlov to Volary) passes through the municipality.

The railway line České Budějovice–Nové Údolí runs along the northwestern municipal border, however, the train station called Černá v Pošumaví is located outside the territory of Černá v Pošumaví.

== Sights ==
The main landmark of Černá v Pošumaví is the Church of the Immaculate Conception. It was built in the Baroque style in 1799–1800, when it replaced a wooden chapel from 1787. It was rebuilt into its present Neo-Romanesque form in 1901–1904.
