= Cerna (Tulcea) =

- Location within Romania

Location
- Country: Romania
- Counties: Tulcea County
- Villages: Cerna, Traian

Physical characteristics
- Mouth: Danube
  - location: Lake Traian
  - coordinates: 45.0323°N 28.2234°E

Basin features
- Progression: Lake Traian→ Danube→ Black Sea
- Tributaries
  - left: Iaila
  - right: Megina

The Cerna is a small right tributary of the Danube in Romania. It flows into Lake Traian, which is connected with the Danube, in the village Traian.
