= Czerna, Żagań County =

Czerna
- Village
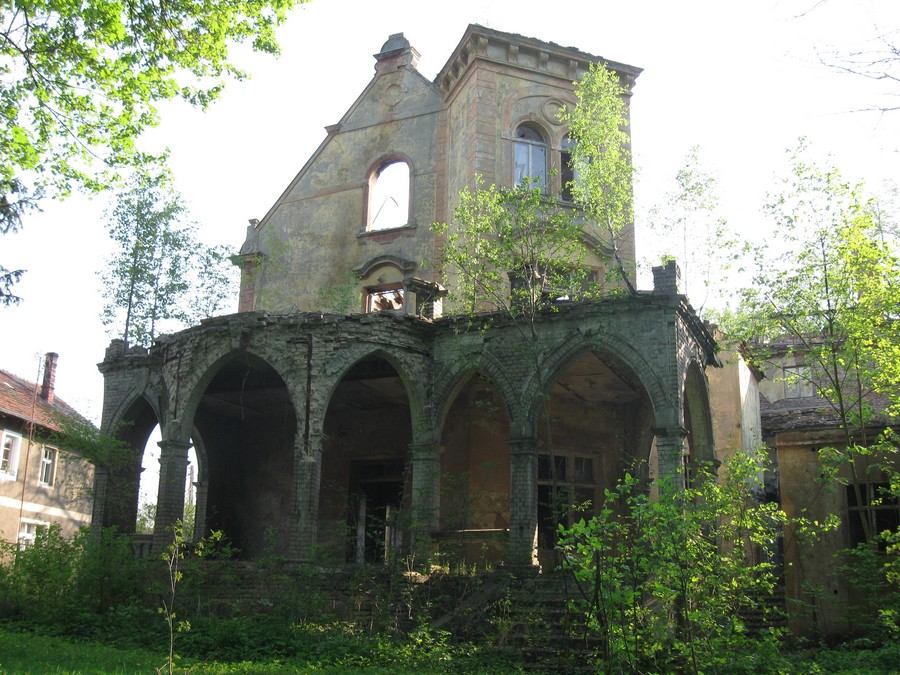
- Palace ruins

- Location within Poland
- Coordinates: 51°31′55″N 15°14′8″E
- Country: Poland
- Voivodeship: Lubusz
- County: Żagań
- Gmina: Iłowa

Population
  - Total: 360
- Time zone: UTC+1 (CET)
  - Summer (DST): UTC+2 (CEST)
- Vehicle registration: FZG

Czerna [ˈt͡ʂɛrna] is a village in the administrative district of Gmina Iłowa, within Żagań County, Lubusz Voivodeship, in western Poland.

== History ==
During World War II, the German Nazi government operated a forced labour subcamp of the Stalag VIII-C prisoner-of-war camp in the village.
