= Konin Żagański =

- Village
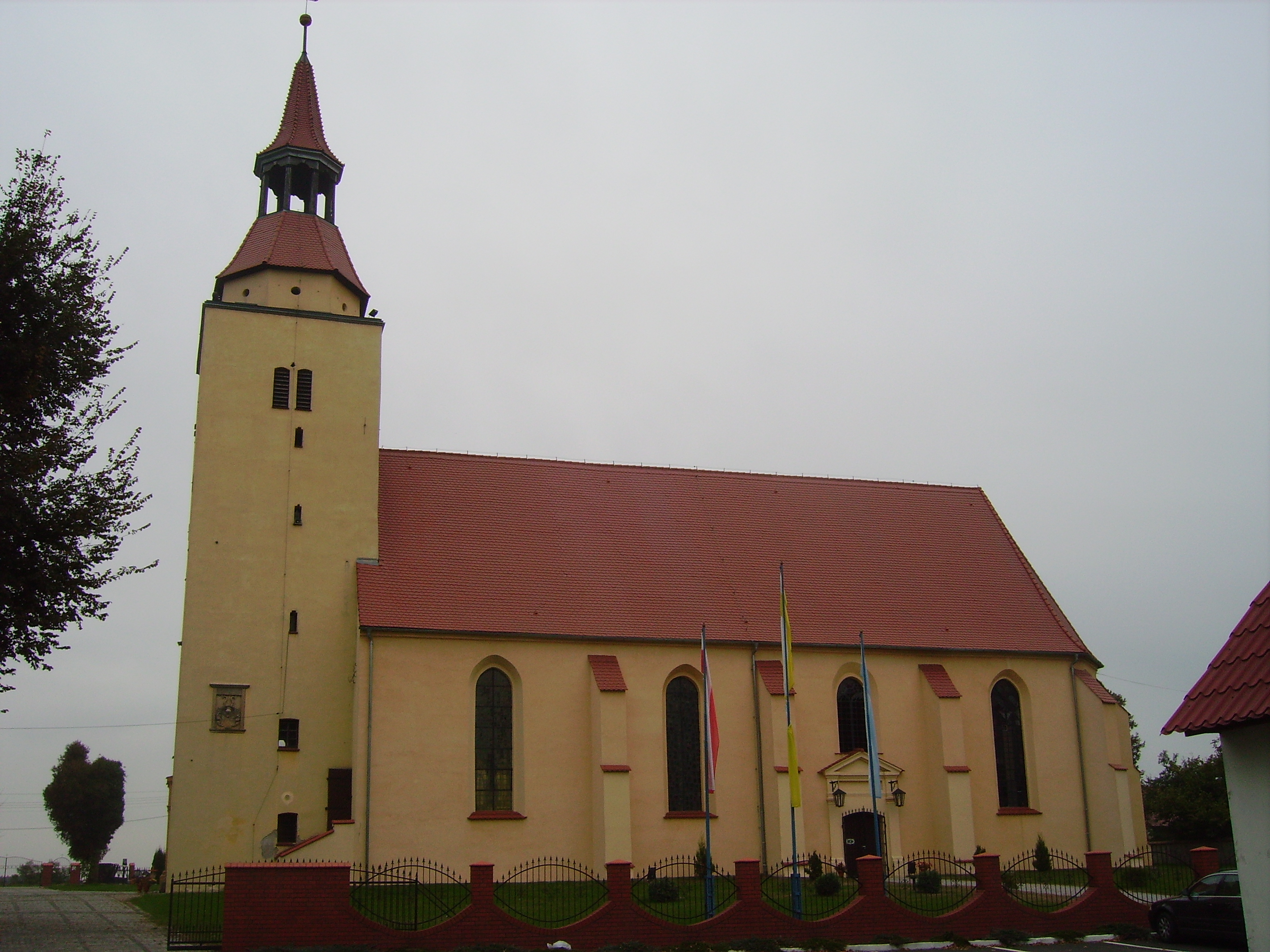
- Saint Bartholomew church in Konin Żagański

- Location within Poland
- Coordinates: 51°32′41″N 15°11′35″E
- Country: Poland
- Voivodeship: Lubusz
- County: Żagań
- Gmina: Iłowa
- Population: 760
- Time zone: UTC+1 (CET)
  - Summer (DST): UTC+2 (CEST)
- Vehicle registration: FZG

Konin Żagański [ˈkɔnin ʐaˈɡaɲski] is a village in the administrative district of Gmina Iłowa, within Żagań County, Lubusz Voivodeship, in western Poland.

== History ==
The name of the village is of Polish origin and comes from the word koń, which means "horse".

In 1939–1940, it was the site of a German Dulag transit prisoner-of-war camp. Its prisoners were mostly Poles captured during the invasion of Poland, which started World War II, but also some Czechs. Following its dissolution the POWs were moved to the Stalag VIII-A and Stalag VIII-C POW camps.

== Transport ==
The A18 motorway runs nearby, south of the village.
