= Cernay =

Cernay may refer to several communes in France:

- Cernay, Calvados, in the Calvados département
- Cernay, Eure-et-Loir, in the Eure-et-Loir département
- Cernay, Haut-Rhin, in the Haut-Rhin département
- Cernay, Vienne, in the Vienne département
- Cernay-en-Dormois, in the Marne département
- Cernay-la-Ville, in the Yvelines département, a suburb of Paris
- Cernay-l'Église, in the Doubs département
- Cernay-lès-Reims, in the Marne département
