= Černá (Lomnice nad Popelkou) =

- Village
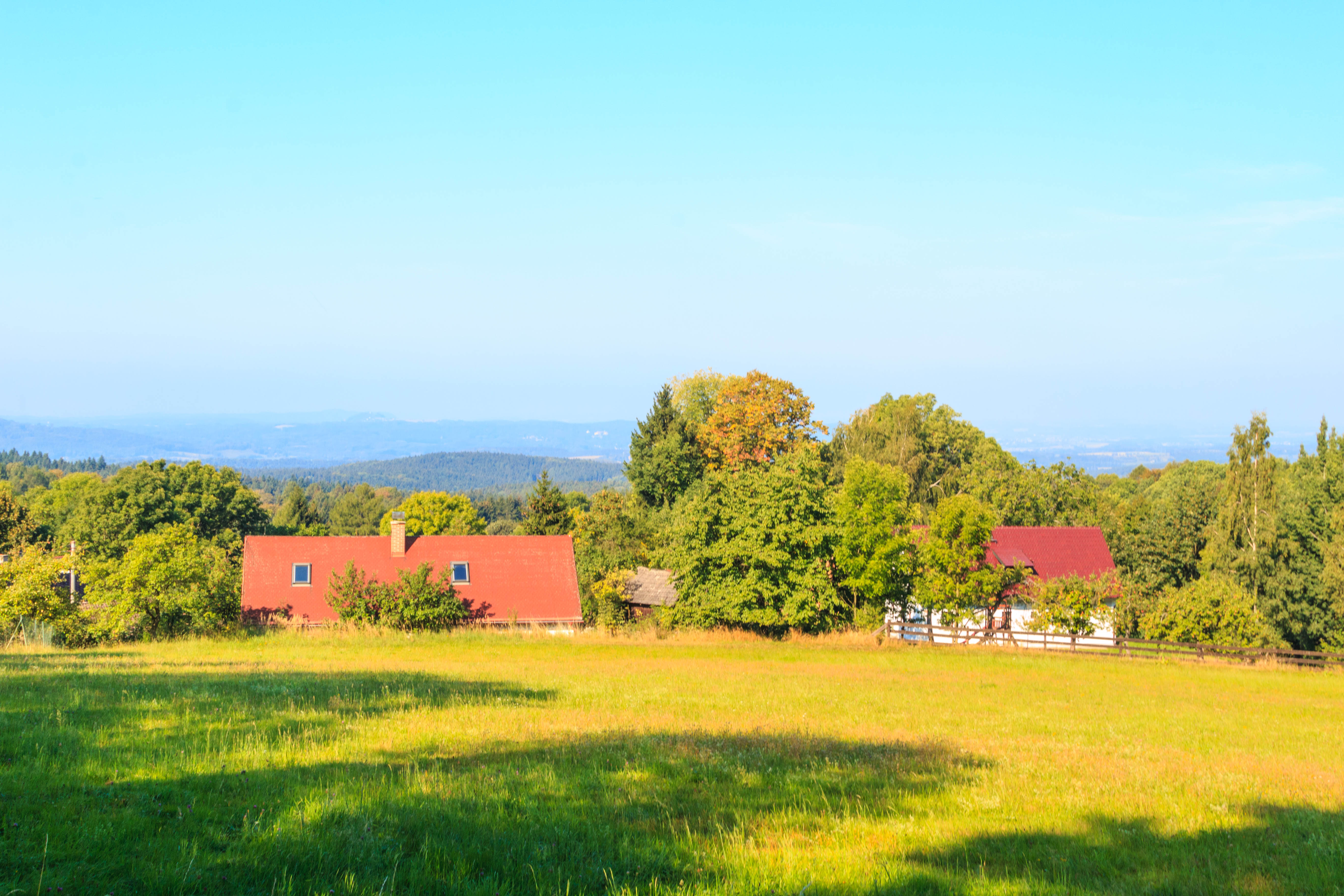
- Landscape at Černá

- Location in the Czech Republic
- Coordinates: 50°31′52″N 15°19′58″E
- Country: Czech Republic
- Region: Liberec
- District: Semily
- Municipality: Lomnice nad Popelkou
- First mentioned: 1395

Area
  - Total: 1.63 km^{2} (0.63 sq mi)
- Elevation: 557 m (1,827 ft)

Population (2021)
  - Total: 70
  - Density: 43/km^{2} (110/sq mi)
- Time zone: UTC+1 (CET)
  - Summer (DST): UTC+2 (CEST)
- Postal code: 512 51

Černá is a village and municipal part of Lomnice nad Popelkou in Semily District in the Liberec Region of the Czech Republic. It has about 70 inhabitants.
