= Cerney =

Cerney is a placename and a surname. It may refer to:

Places

- Cerney, a former village or hamlet near the Welsh town of Wrexham
- Cerney Wick, a village near Cirencester, Gloucestershire. England
- North Cerney, a village and civil parish in the English county of Gloucestershire
- South Cerney, a village and civil parish in the English county of Gloucestershire
  - RAF South Cerney, a former Royal Air Force station located in South Cerney
  - South Cerney Castle, an adulterine castle of motte and bailey construction in South Cerney
  - South Cerney railway station, a former railway station at South Cerney

People

- David Cerney (fl. 1559), Member of Parliament for Malmesbury, England
- Mark Cerney (born 1967), American founder of the Next of Kin Registry
- Todd Cerney (1953–2011), American songwriter and musician

== See also ==
- Cerne (disambiguation)
- Churney (disambiguation)
- Czerny (disambiguation)
