= Černá (Žďár nad Sázavou District) =

- Municipality
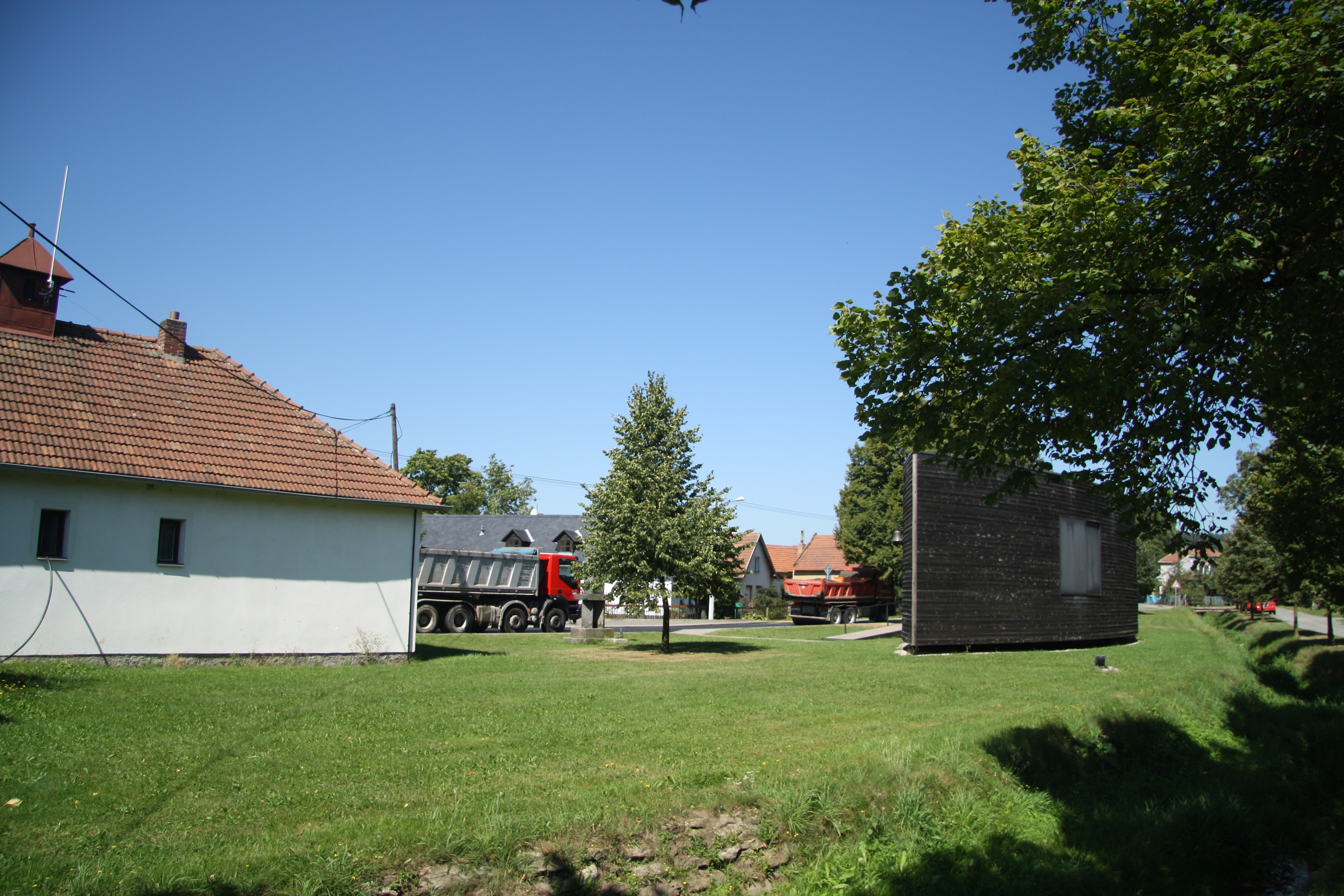
- Centre of Černá

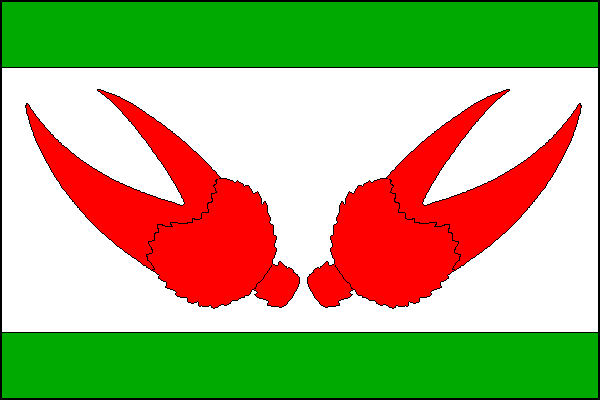
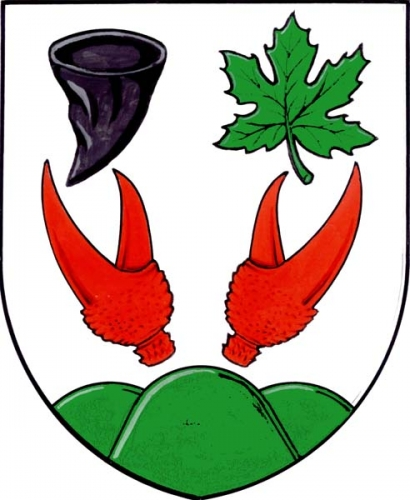
- Flag Coat of arms

- Location in the Czech Republic
- Coordinates: 49°25′34″N 15°51′50″E
- Country: Czech Republic
- Region: Vysočina
- District: Žďár nad Sázavou
- First mentioned: 1464

Area
  - Total: 10.45 km^{2} (4.03 sq mi)
- Elevation: 523 m (1,716 ft)

Population (2026-01-01)
  - Total: 308
  - Density: 29.5/km^{2} (76.3/sq mi)
- Time zone: UTC+1 (CET)
  - Summer (DST): UTC+2 (CEST)
- Postal code: 594 42
- Website: www.obeccerna.cz

Černá is a municipality and village in Žďár nad Sázavou District in the Vysočina Region of the Czech Republic. It has about 300 inhabitants.

== Administrative division ==
Černá consists of two municipal parts (in brackets population according to the 2021 census):

- Černá (240)
- Milíkov (48)

== Etymology ==
The name Černá literally means 'black' in Czech.

== Geography ==
Černá is located about 16 kilometres (10 mi) south of Žďár nad Sázavou and 19 km (12 mi) east of Jihlava. It lies in the Křižanov Highlands. The stream Křivý potok flows through the municipality. The territory is rich in small fishponds.

== History ==
The first written mention of Černá is from 1464. In 1556, the village was bought by Vratislav II of Pernštejn. From 1559, it was owned by the Chroustenský family. Jan Rafael Chroustenský had built a Renaissance castle at the end of the 16th century. After the Battle of White Mountain, the properties of the Chroustenský family were confiscated, and in 1624 Černá was handed over to the Collalto family. They owned the estate until 1918, when the property was confiscated by the government.

== Demographics ==
Historical population

Year	Pop.	±%
1869	585	—
1880	615	+5.1%
1890	596	−3.1%
1900	581	−2.5%
1910	587	+1.0%

Year	Pop.	±%
1921	611	+4.1%
1930	568	−7.0%
1950	492	−13.4%
1961	459	−6.7%
1970	422	−8.1%

Year	Pop.	±%
1980	401	−5.0%
1991	325	−19.0%
2001	310	−4.6%
2011	315	+1.6%
2021	288	−8.6%

Source: Censuses

== Transport ==
There are no railways or major roads passing through the municipality, but the municipality is located near the D1 motorway from Prague to Brno.

== Sights ==
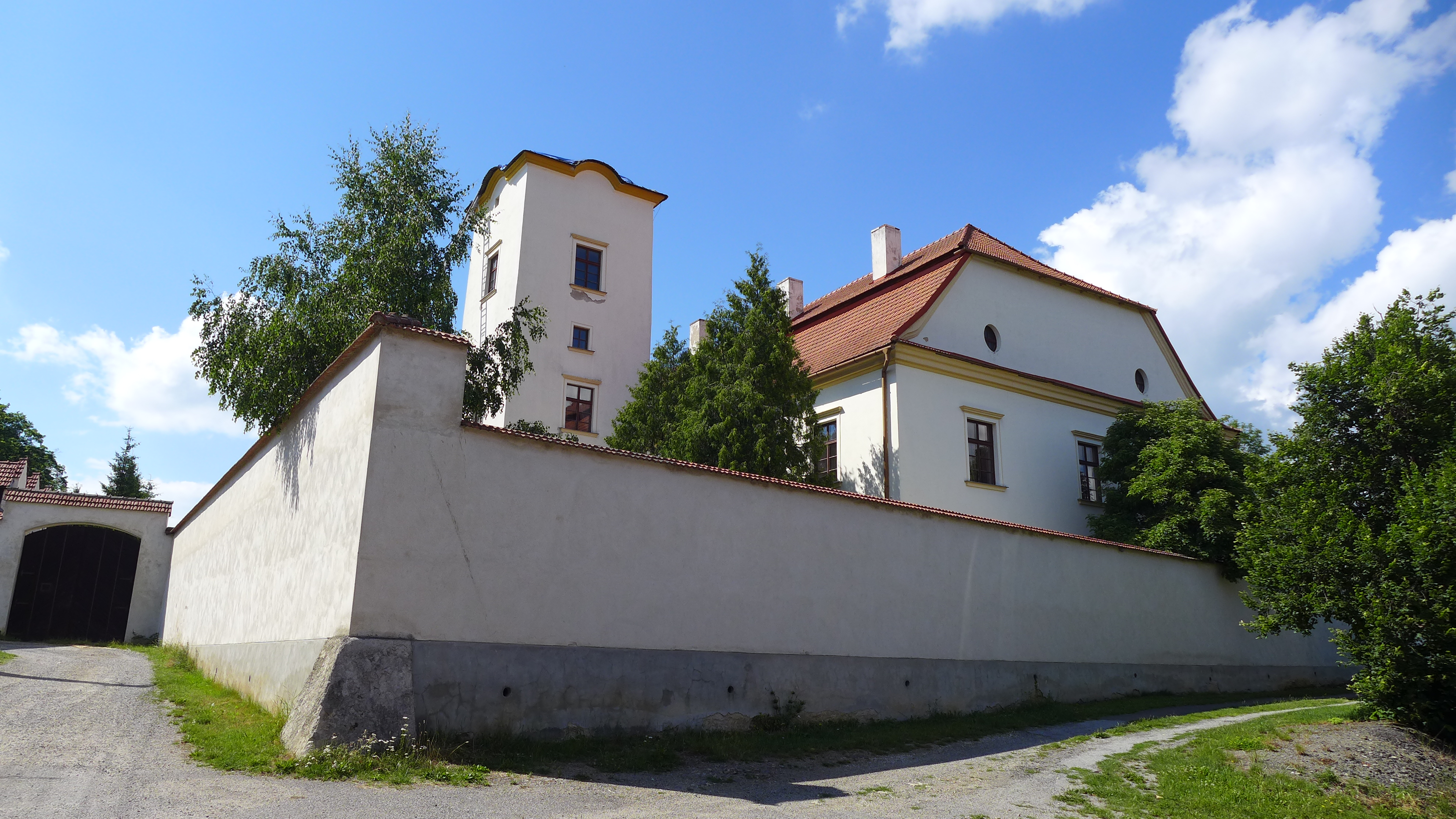
Černá Castle

The castle underwent a Baroque reconstruction in the 18th century, but it mainly concerned interiors and the Renaissance character of the castle was preserved. After 1948 the castle was owned by the municipality, and social and cultural events were held there. At the beginning of the 1990s, the building was sold to the new owner. Today the castle is privately owned and inaccessible to the public.
