= Cerna (surname) =

Cerna is a surname. Notable people with the surname include:

- Panait Cerna (1881–1913), Romanian writer
- J. D. Cerna, American actor
- Ismael Cerna (1856–1901), Guatemalan poet
- Vicente Cerna y Cerna (1815–1885), president of Guatemala

== See also ==
- Cernea (surname)
