= Tyrszeliny =

- Village
- Location within Poland
- Coordinates: 51°57′N 16°0′E
- Country: Poland
- Voivodeship: Lubusz
- County: Nowa Sól
- Gmina: Kolsko

Tyrszeliny [tɨrʂɛˈlinɨ] is a village in the administrative district of Gmina Kolsko, within Nowa Sól County, Lubusz Voivodeship, in western Poland.
