= Strumianki =

- Settlement
- Location within Poland
- Coordinates: 51°56′27″N 15°52′50″E
- Country: Poland
- Voivodeship: Lubusz
- County: Nowa Sól
- Gmina: Kolsko

Strumianki [struˈmjanki] is a settlement in the administrative district of Gmina Kolsko, within Nowa Sól County, Lubusz Voivodeship, in western Poland.
