= Gmina Kolsko =

Gmina Kolsko Kolsko Commune
- Gmina
- Interactive map of Gmina Kolsko
- Coordinates (Kolsko): 51°58′N 15°58′E
- Country: Poland
- Voivodeship: Lubusz
- County: Nowa Sól
- Seat: Kolsko

Area
  - Total: 80.57 km^{2} (31.11 sq mi)

Population (2019-06-30)
  - Total: 3,320
  - Density: 41.2/km^{2} (107/sq mi)
- Website: http://www.gminakolsko.com.pl/

Gmina Kolsko is a rural gmina (administrative district) in Nowa Sól County, Lubusz Voivodeship, in western Poland. Its seat is the village of Kolsko, which lies approximately 24 kilometres (15 mi) north-east of Nowa Sól and 32 km (20 mi) east of Zielona Góra.

The gmina covers an area of 80.57 square kilometres (31.1 sq mi), and as of 2019 its total population is 3,320.

== Villages ==
Gmina Kolsko contains the villages and settlements of Głuszyca, Jesiona, Jesionka, Karszynek, Kolsko, Konotop, Lipka, Marianki, Mesze, Sławocin, Strumianki, Strumiany, Święte, Tatarki, Tyrszeliny, Uście and Zacisze.

== Neighbouring gminas ==
Gmina Kolsko is bordered by the gminas of Bojadła, Kargowa, Nowa Sól, Sława and Wolsztyn.
