= Uście =

- Village
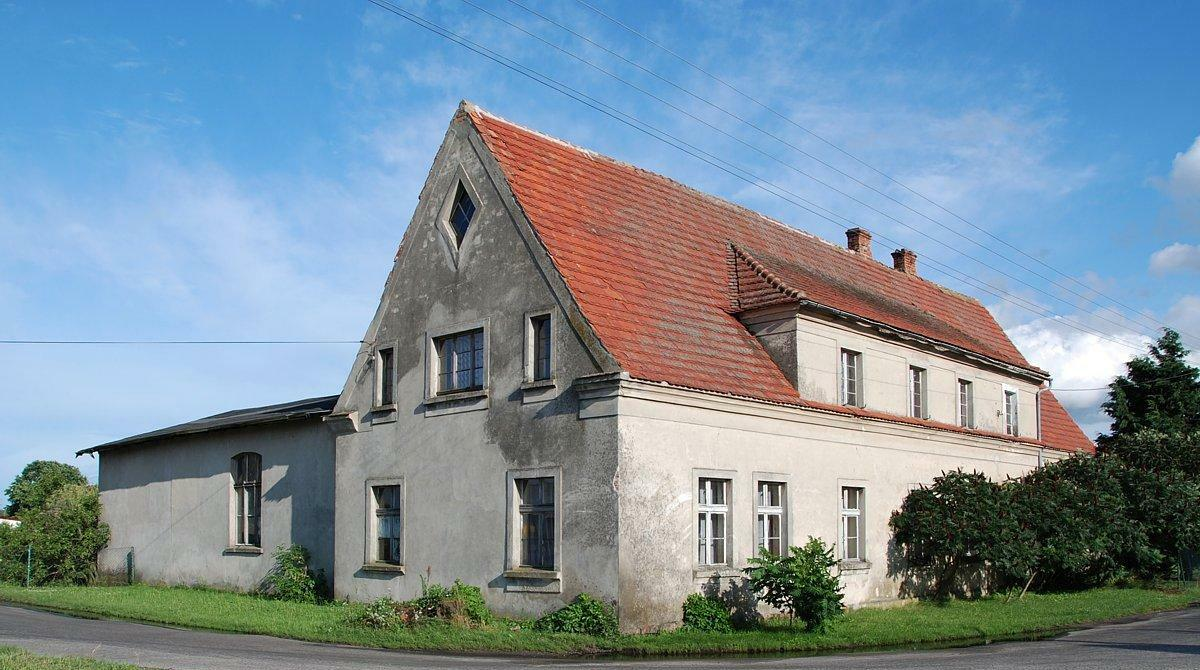

- Location within Poland
- Coordinates: 52°00′57″N 15°56′43″E
- Country: Poland
- Voivodeship: Lubusz
- County: Nowa Sól
- Gmina: Kolsko

Uście [ˈuɕt͡ɕɛ] is a village in the administrative district of Gmina Kolsko, within Nowa Sól County, Lubusz Voivodeship, in western Poland.
