= Lipka, Lubusz Voivodeship =

Lipka
- Village
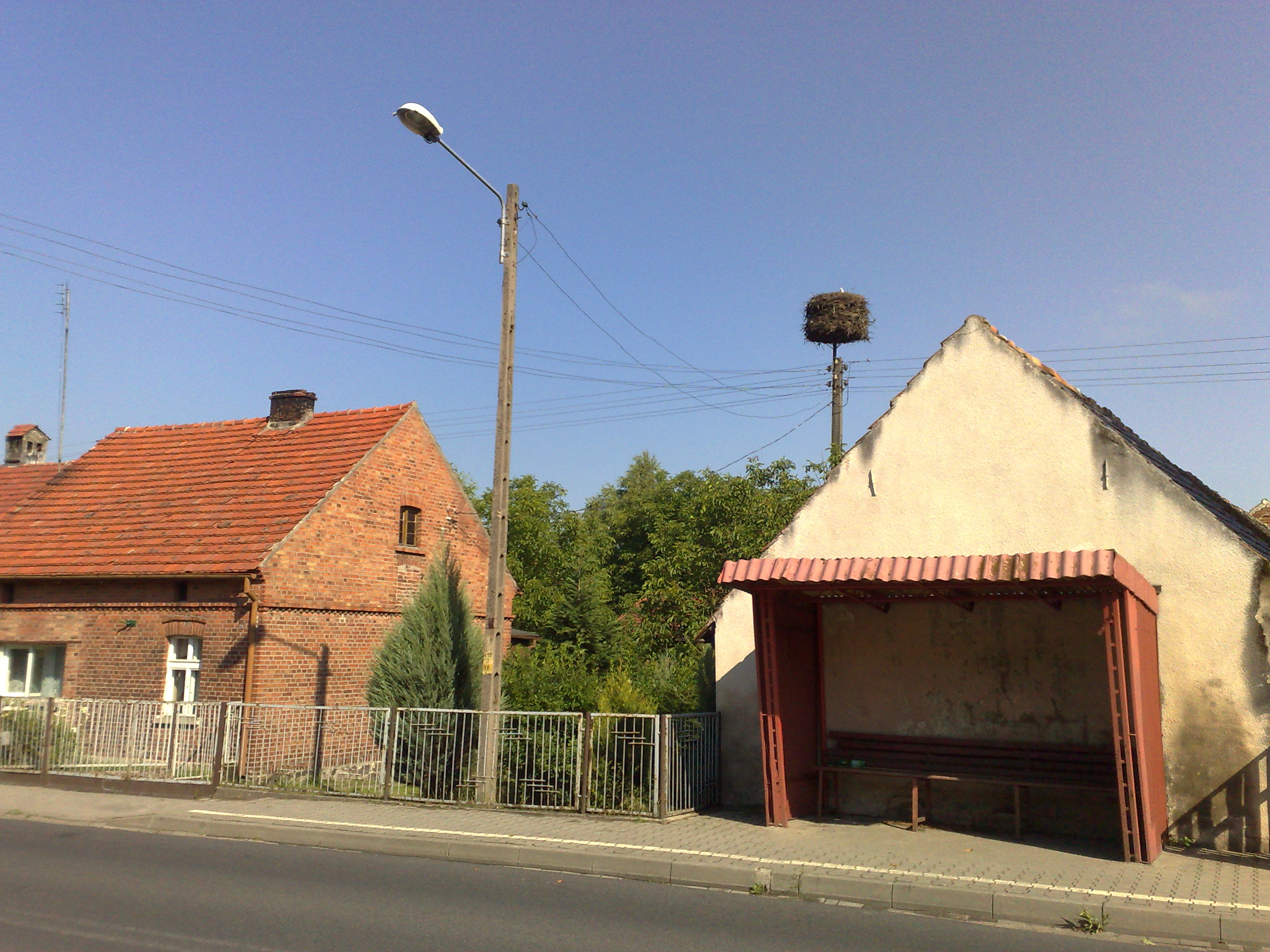

- Location within Poland
- Coordinates: 51°57′N 15°57′E
- Country: Poland
- Voivodeship: Lubusz
- County: Nowa Sól
- Gmina: Kolsko

Lipka [ˈlipka] is a village in the administrative district of Gmina Kolsko, within Nowa Sól County, Lubusz Voivodeship, in western Poland.
