= Zakęcie =

- Village
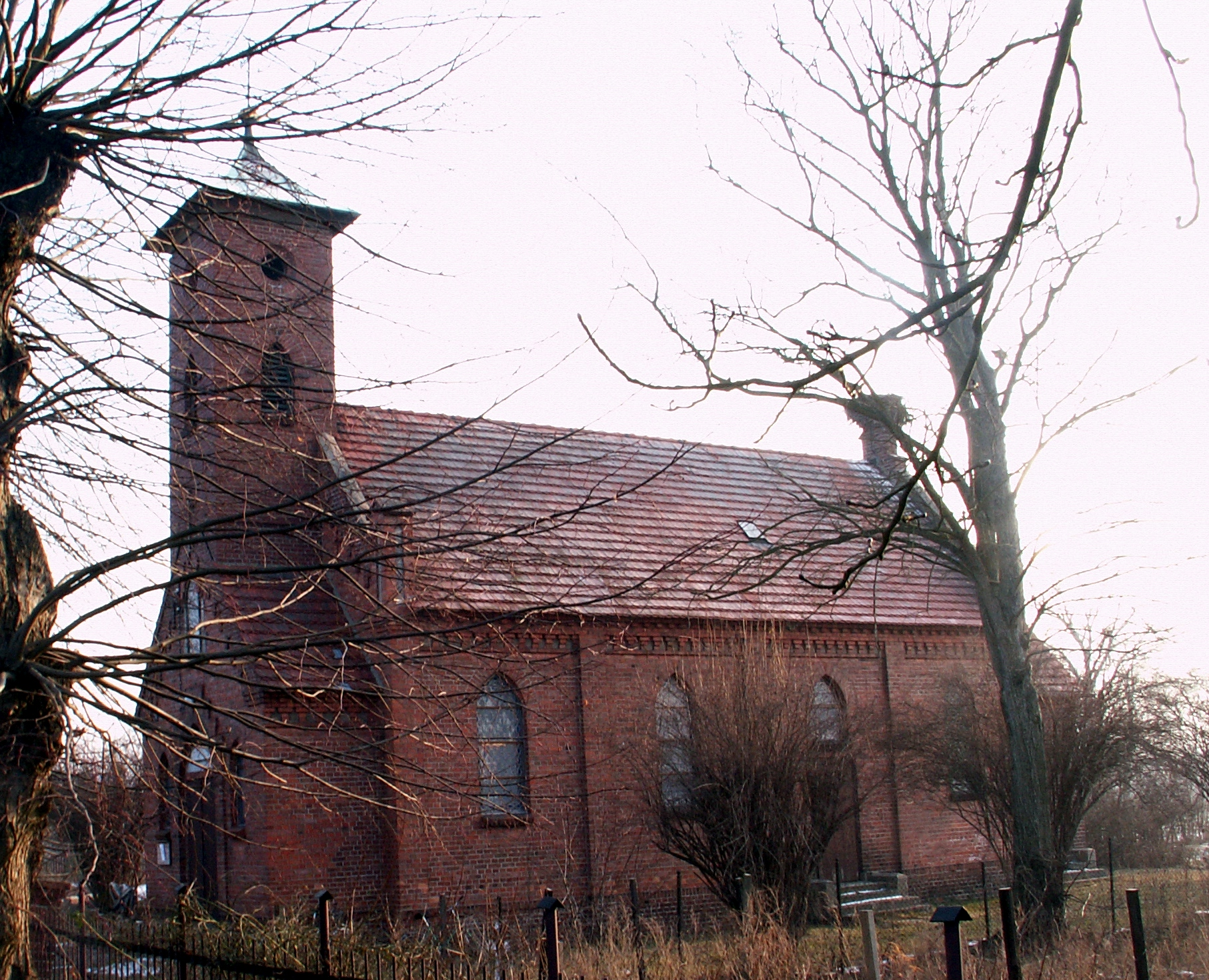
- Catholic church

- Location within Poland
- Coordinates: 51°50′14″N 15°41′19″E
- Country: Poland
- Voivodeship: Lubusz
- County: Nowa Sól
- Gmina: Otyń

Zakęcie [zaˈkɛnt͡ɕɛ] is a village in the administrative district of Gmina Otyń, within Nowa Sól County, Lubusz Voivodeship, in western Poland.
