= Lipiny, Lubusz Voivodeship =

Lipiny
- Village
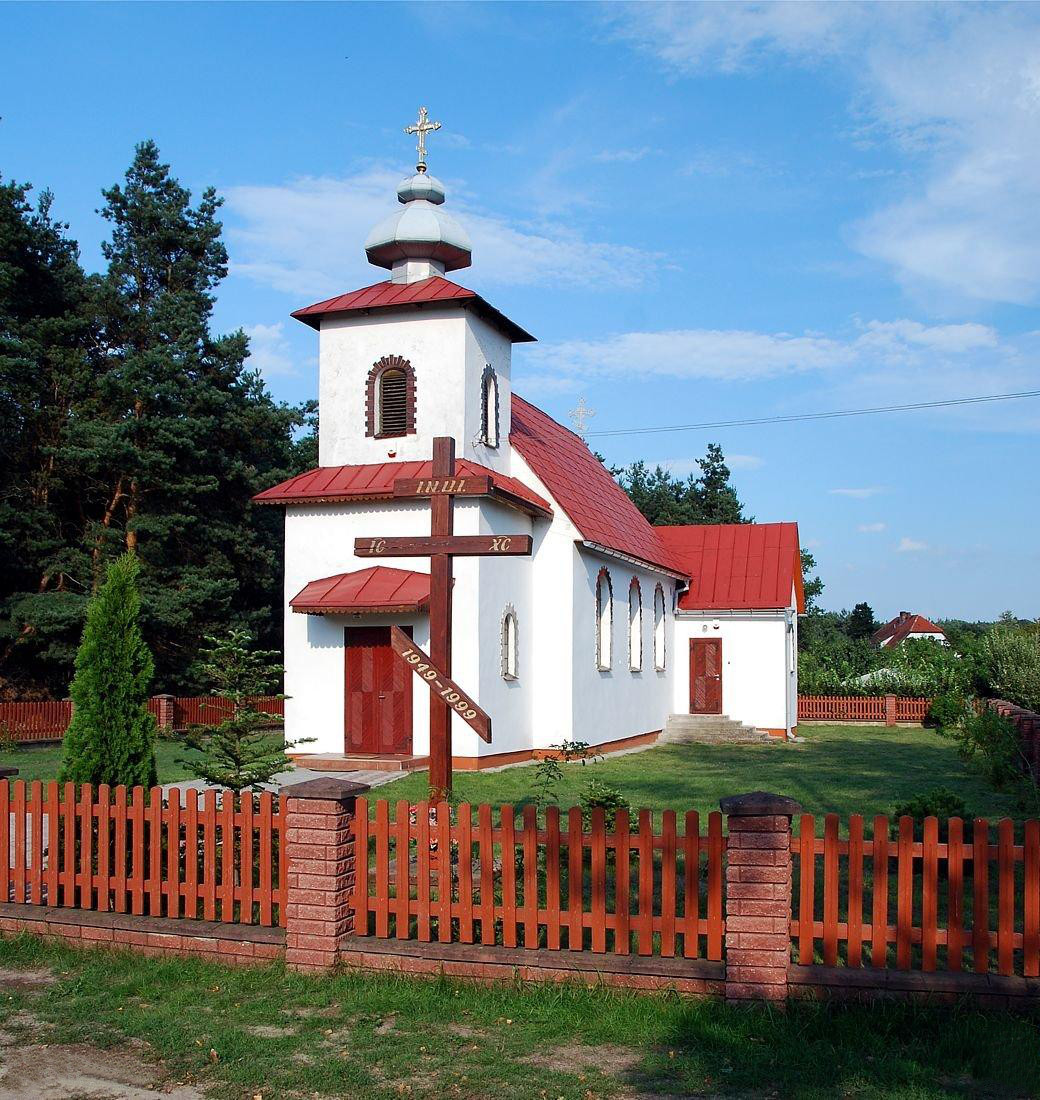
- Orthodox church of Archangel Saint Michael

- Location within Poland
- Coordinates: 51°51′33″N 15°49′5″E
- Country: Poland
- Voivodeship: Lubusz
- County: Nowa Sól
- Gmina: Nowa Sól

Lipiny [liˈpinɨ] is a village in the administrative district of Gmina Nowa Sól, within Nowa Sól County, Lubusz Voivodeship, in western Poland.
