= Marianki, Nowa Sól County =

Marianki
- Village
- Location within Poland
- Coordinates: 51°56′21″N 15°52′16″E
- Country: Poland
- Voivodeship: Lubusz
- County: Nowa Sól
- Gmina: Kolsko

Marianki [maˈrjanki] is a village in the administrative district of Gmina Kolsko, within Nowa Sól County, Lubusz Voivodeship, in western Poland.
