= Ustronie, Lubusz Voivodeship =

Ustronie
- Settlement
- Location within Poland
- Coordinates: 51°46′17″N 15°49′17″E
- Country: Poland
- Voivodeship: Lubusz
- County: Nowa Sól
- Gmina: Siedlisko

Ustronie [usˈtrɔɲɛ] is a settlement in the administrative district of Gmina Siedlisko, within Nowa Sól County, Lubusz Voivodeship, in western Poland.
