= Rudno, Lubusz Voivodeship =

Rudno
- Village
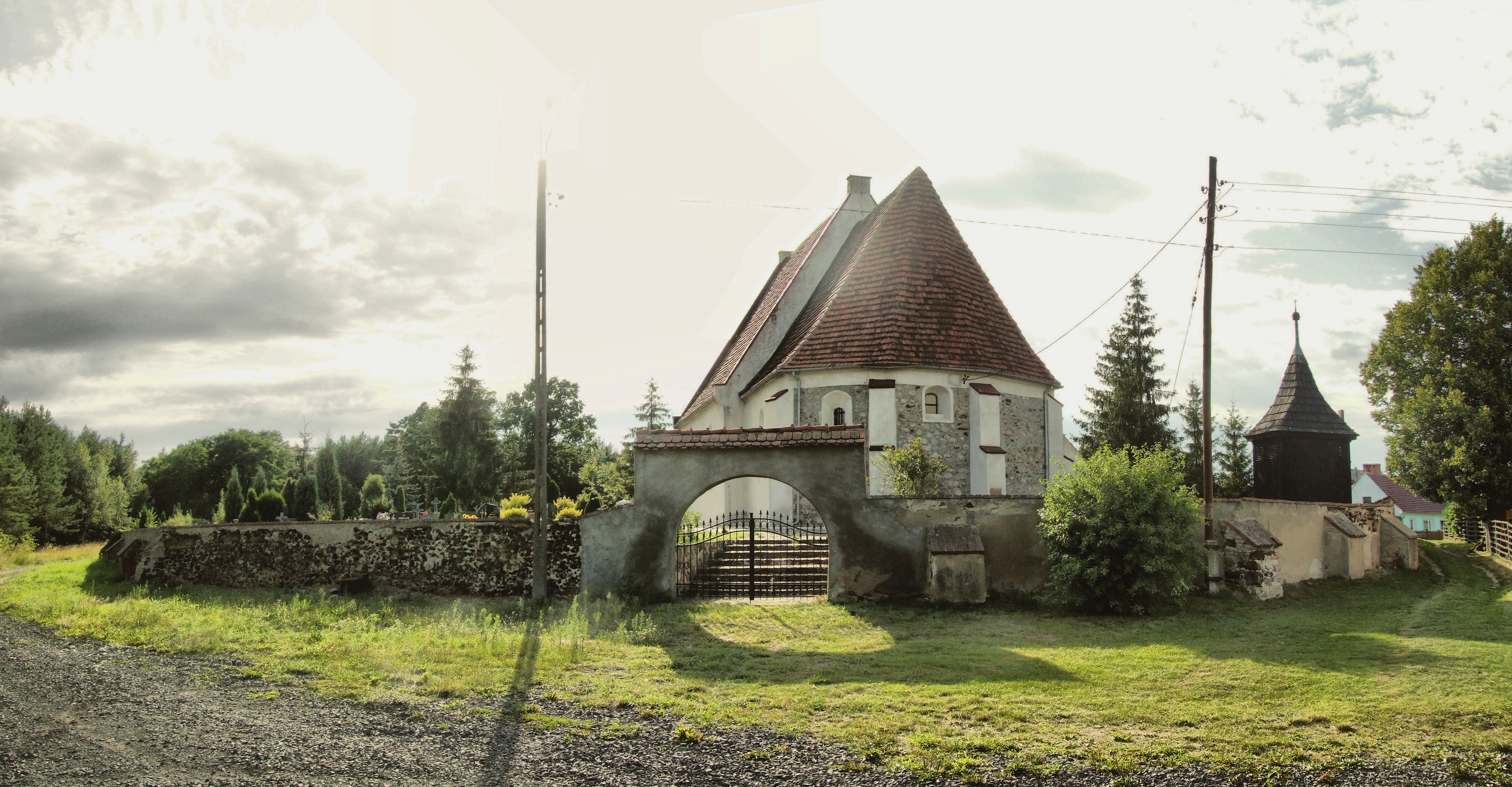
- Church

- Location within Poland
- Coordinates: 51°47′N 15°41′E
- Country: Poland
- Voivodeship: Lubusz
- County: Nowa Sól
- Gmina: Nowa Sól
- Population: 450

Rudno [ˈrudnɔ] is a village in the administrative district of Gmina Nowa Sól, within Nowa Sól County, Lubusz Voivodeship, in western Poland.
