= Przyborów, Nowa Sól County =

Przyborów
- Village
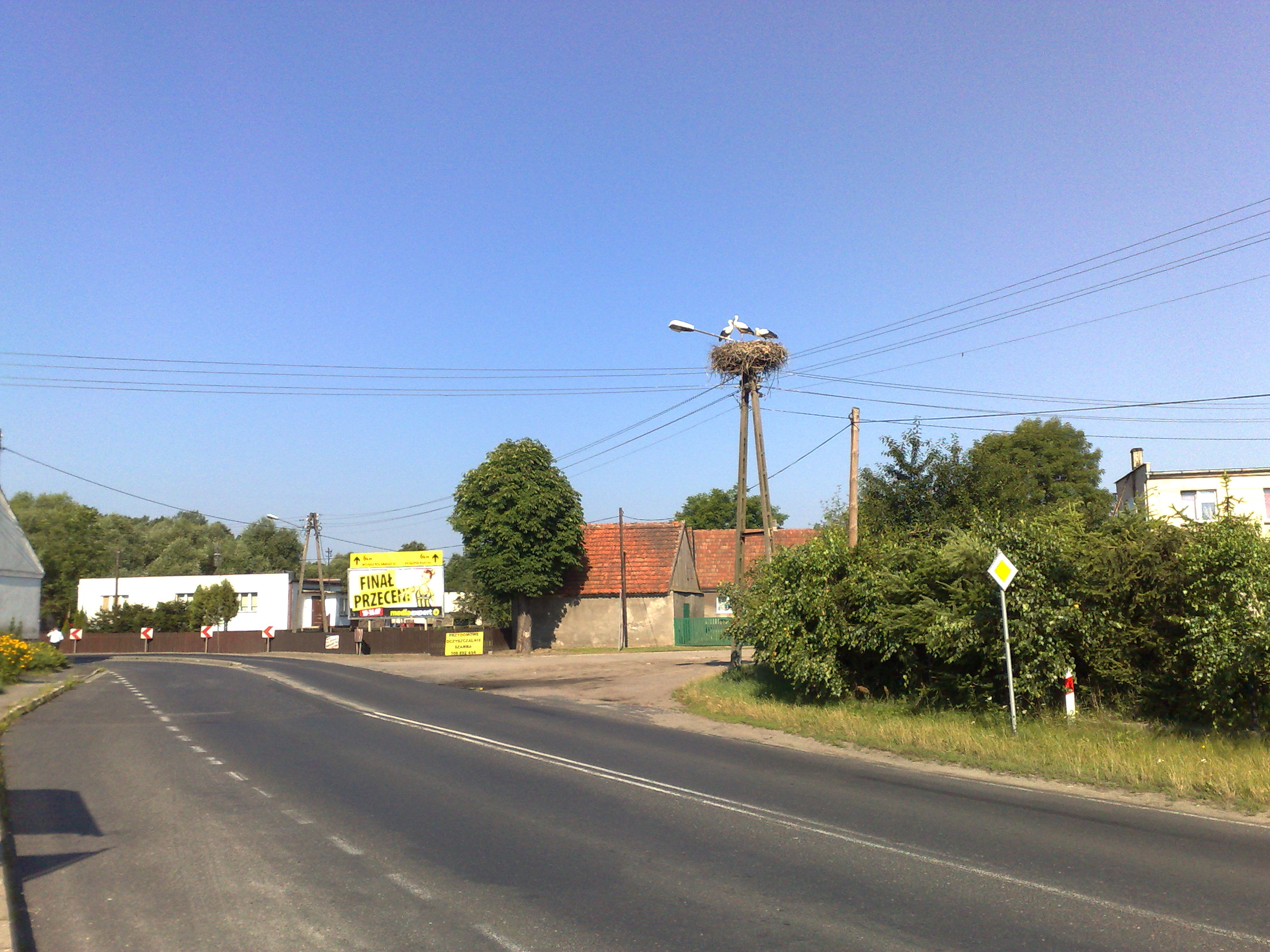

- Location within Poland
- Coordinates: 51°47′57″N 15°46′4″E
- Country: Poland
- Voivodeship: Lubusz
- County: Nowa Sól
- Gmina: Nowa Sól
- Population: 1,200

Przyborów [pʂɨˈbɔruf] is a village in the administrative district of Gmina Nowa Sól, within Nowa Sól County, Lubusz Voivodeship, in western Poland.
