= Kiełcz =

- Village
- Location within Poland
- Coordinates: 51°45′50″N 15°45′18″E
- Country: Poland
- Voivodeship: Lubusz
- County: Nowa Sól
- Gmina: Nowa Sól
- Website: http://www.kielcz.int.pl

Kiełcz [kʲɛu̯t͡ʂ] is a village in the administrative district of Gmina Nowa Sól, within Nowa Sól County, Lubusz Voivodeship, in western Poland.
