= Chełmek (disambiguation) =

Chełmek is a town in Lesser Poland Voivodeship, in southern Poland.

Chełmek may also refer to the following villages:

- Chełmek, Lubusz Voivodeship (west Poland)
- Chełmek, Pomeranian Voivodeship (north Poland)
- Chełmek Wołowski (south-west Poland)
