= Modrzyca =

- Village
- Location within Poland
- Coordinates: 51°50′N 15°43′E
- Country: Poland
- Voivodeship: Lubusz
- County: Nowa Sól
- Gmina: Otyń

Modrzyca (Polish: [mɔdˈʐɨt͡sa]) is a village in the administrative district of Gmina Otyń, within Nowa Sól County, Lubusz Voivodeship, in western Poland.
