= Kierzno, Lubusz Voivodeship =

Kierzno
- Village
- Location within Poland
- Coordinates: 51°45′9″N 15°55′48″E
- Country: Poland
- Voivodeship: Lubusz
- County: Nowa Sól
- Gmina: Siedlisko

Kierzno [ˈkʲɛʐnɔ] is a village in the administrative district of Gmina Siedlisko, within Nowa Sól County, Lubusz Voivodeship, in western Poland.
