= Karszynek =

- Settlement
- Location within Poland
- Coordinates: 52°0′N 15°57′E
- Country: Poland
- Voivodeship: Lubusz
- County: Nowa Sól
- Gmina: Kolsko

Karszynek [karˈʂɨnɛk] is a settlement in the administrative district of Gmina Kolsko, within Nowa Sól County, Lubusz Voivodeship, in western Poland.
