= Stany =

Stany may refer to the following places:

- Stany, Lubusz Voivodeship (west Poland)
- Stany, Silesian Voivodeship (south Poland)
- Stany, Subcarpathian Voivodeship (south-east Poland)
