= Zacisze, Nowa Sól County =

Zacisze
- Settlement
- Location within Poland
- Coordinates: 51°59′34″N 15°58′27″E
- Country: Poland
- Voivodeship: Lubusz
- County: Nowa Sól
- Gmina: Kolsko

Zacisze [zaˈt͡ɕiʂɛ] is a settlement in the administrative district of Gmina Kolsko, within Nowa Sól County, Lubusz Voivodeship, in western Poland.
