= Sławocin =

- Village
- Location within Poland
- Coordinates: 51°58′43″N 16°00′07″E
- Country: Poland
- Voivodeship: Lubusz
- County: Nowa Sól
- Gmina: Kolsko

Sławocin [swaˈvɔt͡ɕin] is a village in the administrative district of Gmina Kolsko, within Nowa Sól County, Lubusz Voivodeship, in western Poland.

== Geography ==
Sławocin lies next to the border with the Wielkopolskie Voivodeship.

== Transport ==
Sławocin lies along vovoideship road 315.

The nearest railway station is in Wolsztyn.
