= Lubieszów, Nowa Sól County =

Lubieszów
- Village
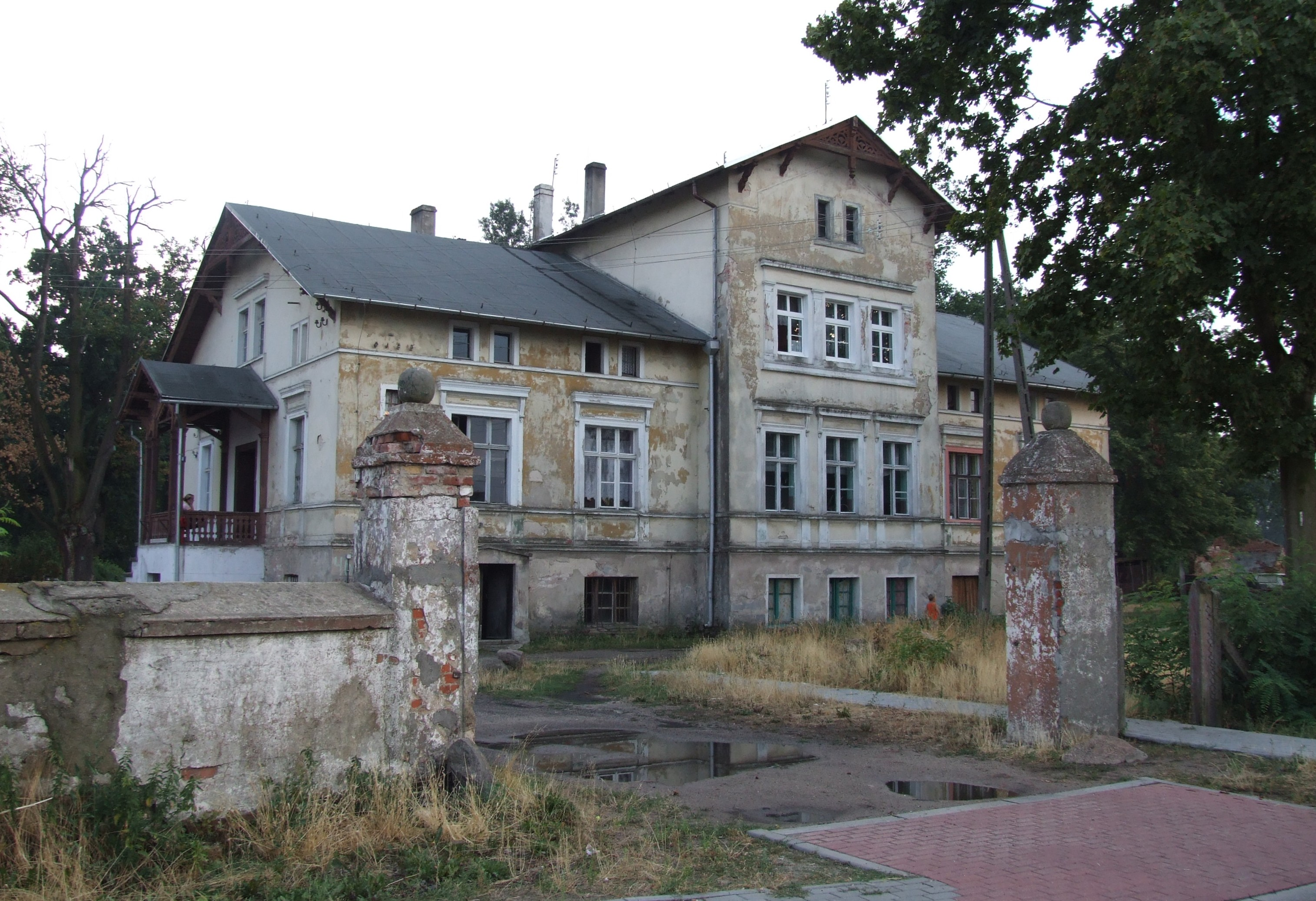
- Manor house

- Location within Poland
- Coordinates: 51°47′N 15°39′E
- Country: Poland
- Voivodeship: Lubusz
- County: Nowa Sól
- Gmina: Nowa Sól

Lubieszów [luˈbjɛʂuf] is a village in the administrative district of Gmina Nowa Sól, within Nowa Sól County, Lubusz Voivodeship, in western Poland.
