= Jodłów =

Jodłów may refer to the following places in Poland:

- Jodłów, Lower Silesian Voivodeship (south-west Poland)
- Jodłów, Lubusz Voivodeship (west Poland)
- Jodłów, Opole Voivodeship (south-west Poland)
