= Dębianka =

Administrative district in western Poland

- Settlement
- Location within Poland
- Coordinates: 51°44′33″N 15°52′09″E
- Country: Poland
- Voivodeship: Lubusz
- County: Nowa Sól
- Gmina: Siedlisko

Dębianka [dɛmˈbjanka] is a settlement in the administrative district of Gmina Siedlisko, within Nowa Sól County, Lubusz Voivodeship, in western Poland.
