= Okopiec =

- Village
- Location within Poland
- Coordinates: 51°53′N 15°55′E
- Country: Poland
- Voivodeship: Lubusz
- County: Nowa Sól
- Gmina: Nowa Sól

Okopiec [ɔˈkɔpjɛt͡s] is a village in the administrative district of Gmina Nowa Sól, within Nowa Sól County, Lubusz Voivodeship, in western Poland.
