= Buczków, Lubusz Voivodeship =

Buczków
- Village
- Location within Poland
- Coordinates: 51°53′54″N 15°49′24″E
- Country: Poland
- Voivodeship: Lubusz
- County: Nowa Sól
- Gmina: Nowa Sól

Buczków [ˈbut͡ʂkuf] is a village in the administrative district of Gmina Nowa Sól, within Nowa Sól County, Lubusz Voivodeship, in western Poland.
