= Dąbrowno, Lubusz Voivodeship =

Dąbrowno
- Village
- Location within Poland
- Coordinates: 51°52′55″N 15°55′20″E
- Country: Poland
- Voivodeship: Lubusz
- County: Nowa Sól
- Gmina: Nowa Sól

Dąbrowno [dɔmˈbrɔvnɔ] is a village in the administrative district of Gmina Nowa Sól, within Nowa Sól County, Lubusz Voivodeship, in western Poland.
