= Józefów, Lubusz Voivodeship =

Józefów
- Village
- Location within Poland
- Coordinates: 51°55′N 15°57′E
- Country: Poland
- Voivodeship: Lubusz
- County: Nowa Sól
- Gmina: Nowa Sól
- Time zone: UTC+1 (CET)
  - Summer (DST): UTC+2 (CEST)

Józefów (Polish pronunciation: [juˈzɛfuf]) is a village in the administrative district of Gmina Nowa Sól, within Nowa Sól County, Lubusz Voivodeship, in western Poland. It is situated on the western shore of Lake Sławskie.
