= Bielawy, Lubusz Voivodeship =

Bielawy
- Village
- Location within Poland
- Coordinates: 51°46′N 15°56′E
- Country: Poland
- Voivodeship: Lubusz
- County: Nowa Sól
- Gmina: Siedlisko

Population (approx.)
  - Total: 750
- Postal code: 67-112
- Vehicle registration: FNW

Bielawy ([bjɛˈlavɨ]; German: Bielawe, 1936–45 Lindenkranz) is a village in the administrative district of Gmina Siedlisko, within Nowa Sól County, Lubusz Voivodeship, in western Poland.
