= Stara Wieś, Lubusz Voivodeship =

Stara Wieś
- Village
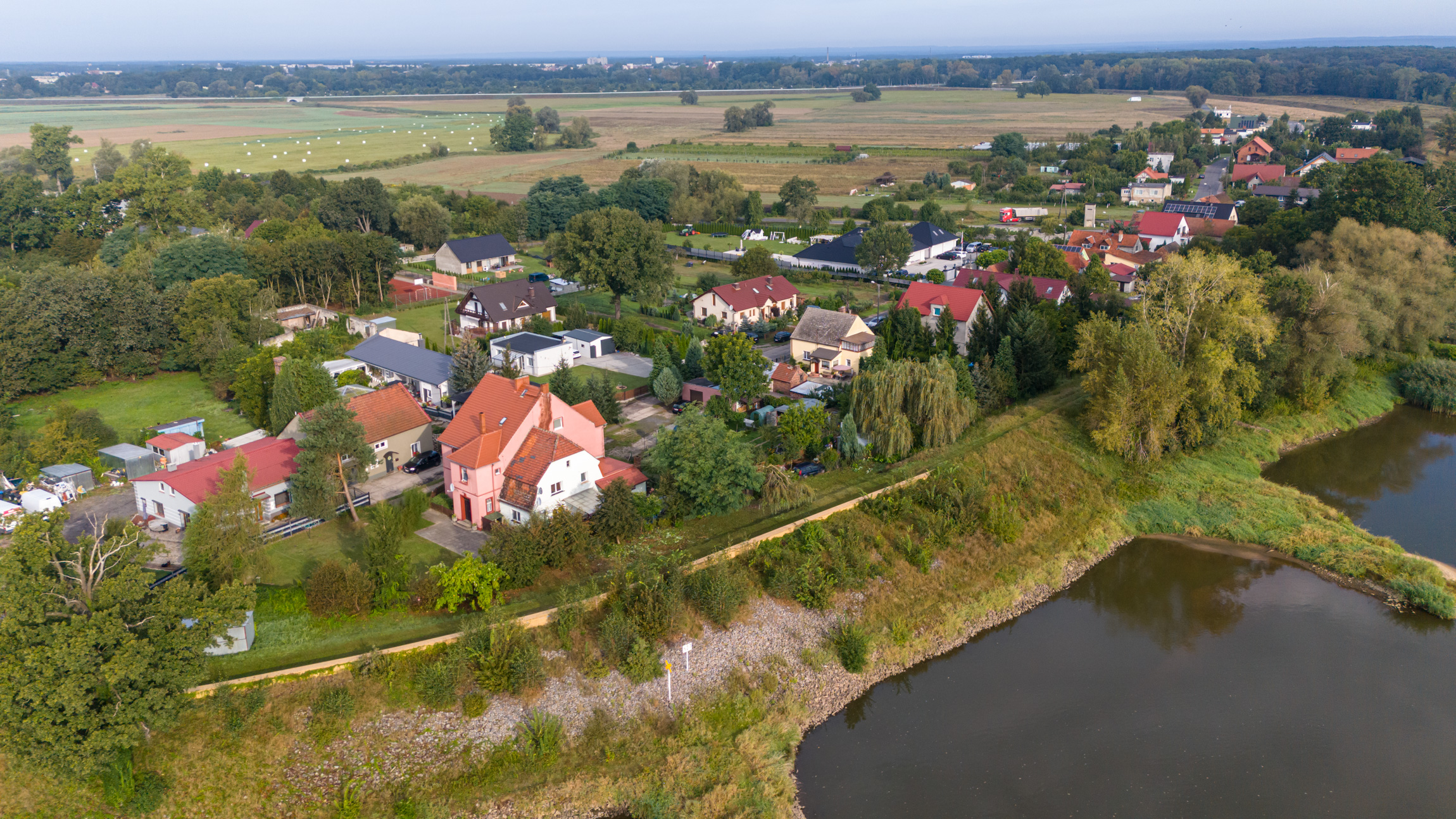

- Location within Poland
- Coordinates: 51°47′25″N 15°44′55″E
- Country: Poland
- Voivodeship: Lubusz
- County: Nowa Sól
- Gmina: Nowa Sól

Stara Wieś [ˈstara ˈvjɛɕ] is a village in the administrative district of Gmina Nowa Sól, within Nowa Sól County, Lubusz Voivodeship, in western Poland.
