= Lubięcin =

- Village
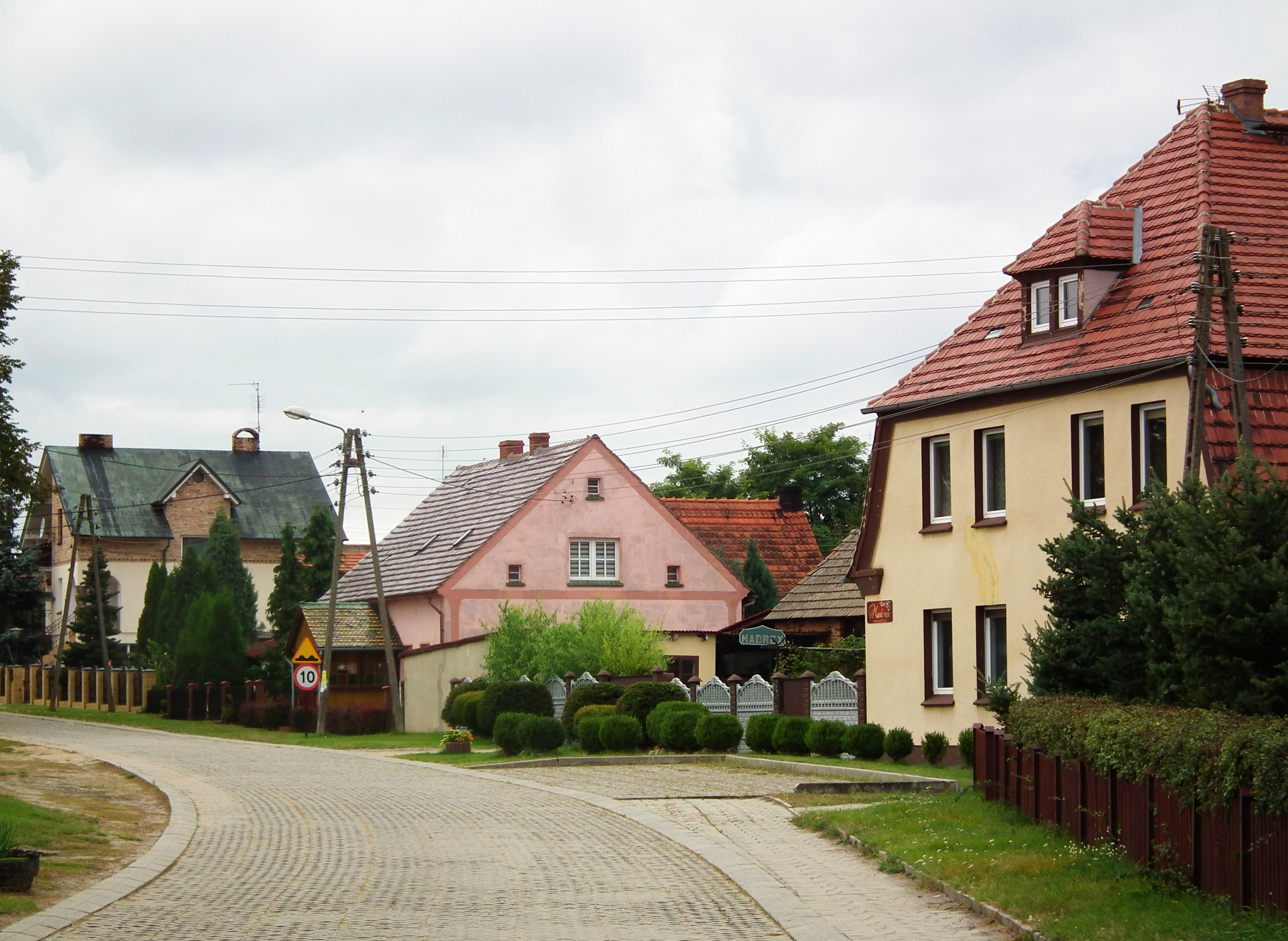

- Location within Poland
- Coordinates: 51°53′16″N 15°52′37″E
- Country: Poland
- Voivodeship: Lubusz
- County: Nowa Sól
- Gmina: Nowa Sól

Lubięcin [luˈbjɛnt͡ɕin] is a village in the administrative district of Gmina Nowa Sól, within Nowa Sól County, Lubusz Voivodeship, in western Poland.
