= Odra, Lubusz Voivodeship =

Odra
- Village
- Location within Poland
- Coordinates: 51°48′N 15°44′E
- Country: Poland
- Voivodeship: Lubusz
- County: Nowa Sól
- Gmina: Nowa Sól

Odra [ˈɔdra] is a village in the administrative district of Gmina Nowa Sól, within Nowa Sól County, Lubusz Voivodeship, in western Poland.
