= Czasław, Lubusz Voivodeship =

Czasław
- Village
- Location within Poland
- Coordinates: 51°50′4″N 15°35′47″E
- Country: Poland
- Voivodeship: Lubusz
- County: Nowa Sól
- Gmina: Otyń

Czasław [ˈt͡ʂaswaf] is a village in the administrative district of Gmina Otyń, within Nowa Sól County, Lubusz Voivodeship, in western Poland.
