= Stawy, Lubusz Voivodeship =

Stawy
- Village
- Location within Poland
- Coordinates: 51°54′9″N 15°51′22″E
- Country: Poland
- Voivodeship: Lubusz
- County: Nowa Sól
- Gmina: Nowa Sól

Stawy [ˈstavɨ] is a village in the administrative district of Gmina Nowa Sól, within Nowa Sól County, Lubusz Voivodeship, in western Poland.
