= Święte, Lubusz Voivodeship =

Święte
- Settlement
- Location within Poland
- Coordinates: 51°55′25″N 15°56′47″E
- Country: Poland
- Voivodeship: Lubusz
- County: Nowa Sól
- Gmina: Kolsko

Święte (Polish pronunciation: [ˈɕfjɛntɛ]) is a settlement in the administrative district of Gmina Kolsko, within Nowa Sól County, Lubusz Voivodeship, in western Poland.
