= Ciepiela =

Ciepiela is a Polish surname. Notable people with the surname include:

- Bartłomiej Ciepiela (born 2001), Polish footballer
- Jan Ciepiela (born 1981), Polish sprinter

== See also ==
- Ciepielów (disambiguation)
