= Radocin =

- Settlement
- Location within Poland
- Coordinates: 51°44′N 15°53′E
- Country: Poland
- Voivodeship: Lubusz
- County: Nowa Sól
- Gmina: Siedlisko

Radocin [raˈdɔt͡ɕin] is a settlement in the administrative district of Gmina Siedlisko, within Nowa Sól County, Lubusz Voivodeship, in western Poland.
