= Głuszyca, Lubusz Voivodeship =

Głuszyca
- Settlement
- Location within Poland
- Coordinates: 51°58′N 15°54′E
- Country: Poland
- Voivodeship: Lubusz
- County: Nowa Sól
- Gmina: Kolsko

Głuszyca [ɡwuˈʂɨt͡sa] is a settlement in the administrative district of Gmina Kolsko, within Nowa Sól County, Lubusz Voivodeship, in western Poland.
