= Gmina Otyń =

Gmina Otyń Otyń Commune
- Gmina
- Coat of arms
- Interactive map of Gmina Otyń
- Coordinates (Otyń): 51°50′50″N 15°42′35″E
- Country: Poland
- Voivodeship: Lubusz
- County: Nowa Sól
- Seat: Otyń

Area
  - Total: 91.64 km^{2} (35.38 sq mi)

Population (2019-06-30)
  - Total: 6,986
  - Density: 76.23/km^{2} (197.4/sq mi)
  - Urban: 1,615
  - Rural: 5,371
- Website: http://www.otyn.pl

Gmina Otyń is an urban-rural gmina (administrative district) in Nowa Sól County, Lubusz Voivodeship, in western Poland. Its seat is the town of Otyń, which lies approximately 6 kilometres (4 mi) north of Nowa Sól and 18 km (11 mi) south-east of Zielona Góra.

The gmina covers an area of 91.64 square kilometres (35.4 sq mi), and as of 2019 its total population is 6,986.

== Villages ==
Apart from the town of Otyń, Gmina Otyń contains the villages and settlements of Bobrowniki, Czasław, Konradowo, Ługi, Modrzyca, Niedoradz and Zakęcie.

== Neighbouring gminas ==
Gmina Otyń is bordered by the town of Nowa Sól and by the gminas of Bojadła, Kożuchów, Nowa Sól, Zabór and Zielona Góra.

== Twin towns – sister cities ==
Gmina Otyń is twinned with:

- Falkenberg, Germany
- Tsuman, Ukraine
- Zuberec, Slovakia
