= Zwierzyniec, Lubusz Voivodeship =

Zwierzyniec
- Village
- Location within Poland
- Coordinates: 51°47′48″N 15°50′3″E
- Country: Poland
- Voivodeship: Lubusz
- County: Nowa Sól
- Gmina: Siedlisko
- Population: 40

Zwierzyniec (Polish: [zvjɛˈʐɨɲɛt͡s]) is a village in the administrative district of Gmina Siedlisko, within Nowa Sól County, Lubusz Voivodeship, in western Poland.
