= Borowiec, Lubusz Voivodeship =

Borowiec
- Village
- Location within Poland
- Coordinates: 51°48′N 15°52′E
- Country: Poland
- Voivodeship: Lubusz
- County: Nowa Sól
- Gmina: Siedlisko
- Time zone: UTC+1 (CET)
  - Summer (DST): UTC+2 (CEST)
- Vehicle registration: FNW

Borowiec [bɔˈrɔvjɛt͡s] is a village in the administrative district of Gmina Siedlisko, within Nowa Sól County, Lubusz Voivodeship, in western Poland.

Three Polish citizens were murdered by Nazi Germany in the village during World War II.
