= Ługi, Nowa Sól County =

Ługi
- Village
- Location within Poland
- Coordinates: 51°40′22″N 15°41′18″E
- Country: Poland
- Voivodeship: Lubusz
- County: Nowa Sól
- Gmina: Otyń

Ługi [ˈwuɡi] is a village in the administrative district of Gmina Otyń, within Nowa Sól County, Lubusz Voivodeship, in western Poland.
