= Tatarki, Lubusz Voivodeship =

Tatarki
- Village
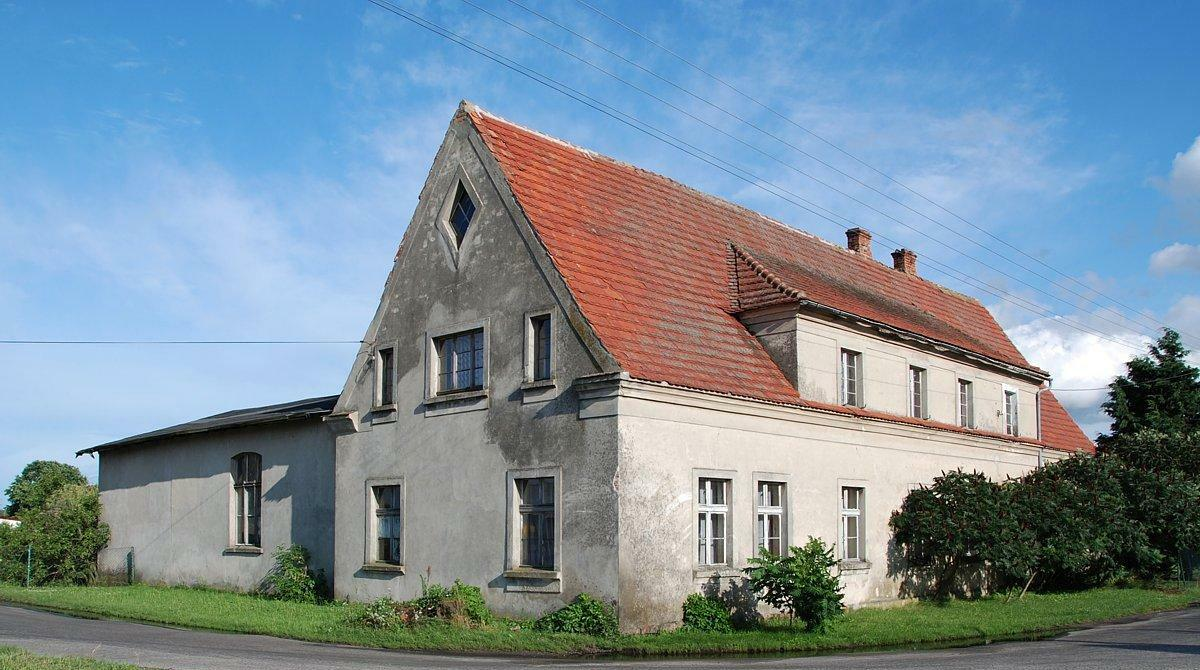

- Location within Poland
- Coordinates: 52°00′36″N 15°56′34″E
- Country: Poland
- Voivodeship: Lubusz
- County: Nowa Sól
- Gmina: Kolsko

Tatarki [taˈtarki] is a village in the administrative district of Gmina Kolsko, within Nowa Sól County, Lubusz Voivodeship, in western Poland.
