= Radosławice =

- Village
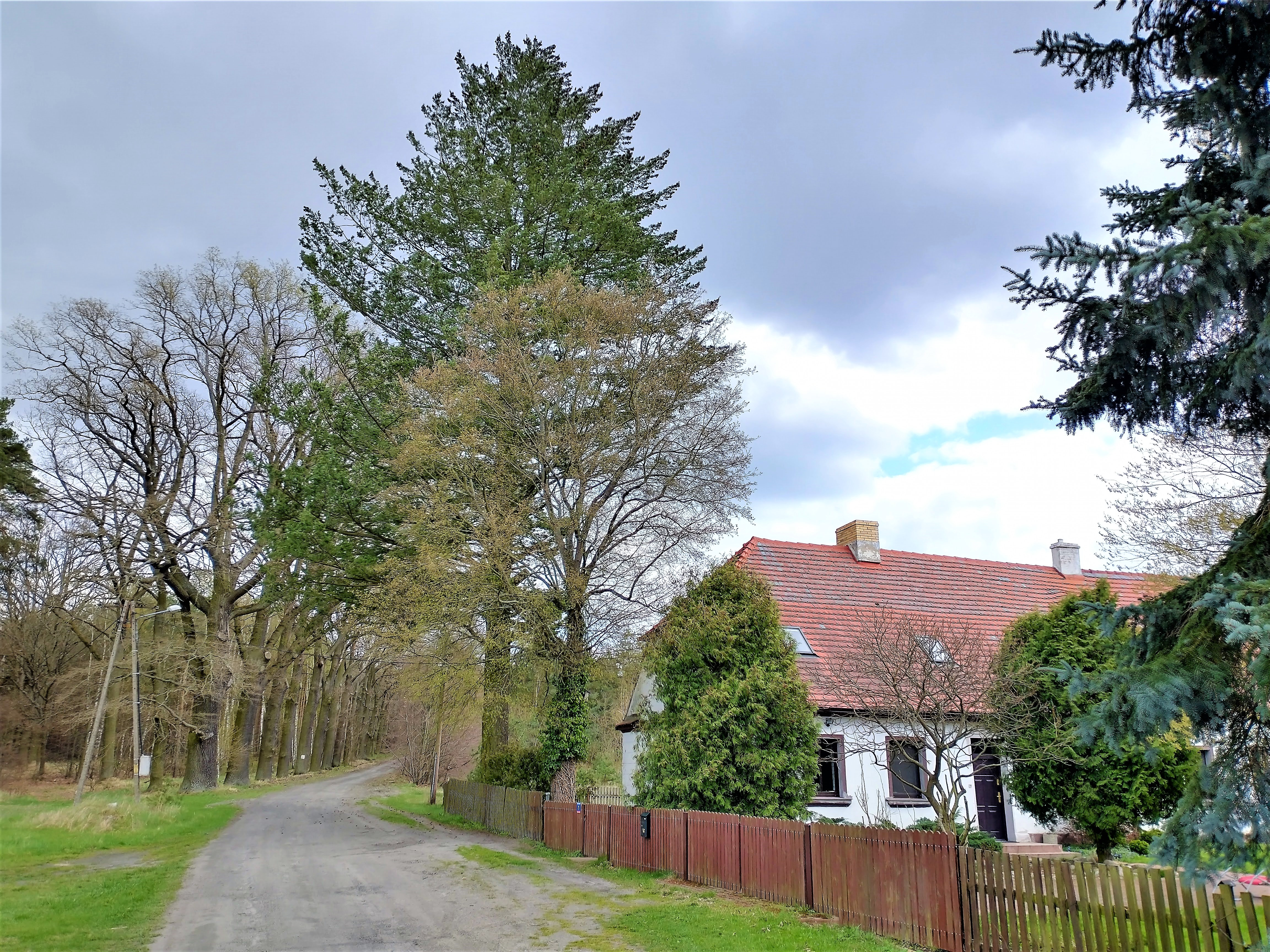

- Location within Poland
- Coordinates: 51°53′6″N 15°50′55″E
- Country: Poland
- Voivodeship: Lubusz
- County: Nowa Sól
- Gmina: Nowa Sól

Radosławice [radɔswaˈvit͡sɛ] is a village in the administrative district of Gmina Nowa Sól, within Nowa Sól County, Lubusz Voivodeship, in western Poland.
