= Gmina Nowa Sól =

Gmina Nowa Sól Nowa Sól Commune
- Gmina
- Flag Coat of arms
- Interactive map of Gmina Nowa Sól
- Coordinates (Nowa Sól): 51°48′N 15°43′E
- Country: Poland
- Voivodeship: Lubusz
- County: Nowa Sól
- Seat: Nowa Sól

Area
  - Total: 176.21 km^{2} (68.04 sq mi)

Population (2019-06-30)
  - Total: 6,959
  - Density: 39.49/km^{2} (102.3/sq mi)
- Website: http://www.gminanowasol.pl

Gmina Nowa Sól is a rural gmina (administrative district) in Nowa Sól County, Lubusz Voivodeship, in western Poland. Its seat is the town of Nowa Sól, although the town is not part of the territory of the gmina.

The gmina covers an area of 176.21 square kilometres (68.0 sq mi), and as of 2019 its total population is 6,959.

== Villages ==
Gmina Nowa Sól contains the villages and settlements of Buczków, Chełmek, Ciepielów, Dąbrowno, Drogoniów, Jeziorna, Jodłów, Józefów, Kiełcz, Lelechów, Lipiny, Lubięcin, Lubieszów, Nowe Żabno, Odra, Okopiec, Porębów, Przyborów, Radosławice, Rudno, Stany, Stara Wieś, Stary Staw, Stawy and Wrociszów.

== Neighbouring gminas ==
Gmina Nowa Sól is bordered by the town of Nowa Sól and by the gminas of Bojadła, Bytom Odrzański, Kolsko, Kożuchów, Nowe Miasteczko, Otyń, Siedlisko and Sława.
