= Gmina Siedlisko =

Gmina Siedlisko Siedlisko Commune
- Gmina
- Coat of arms
- Interactive map of Gmina Siedlisko
- Coordinates (Siedlisko): 51°46′N 15°49′E
- Country: Poland
- Voivodeship: Lubusz
- County: Nowa Sól
- Seat: Siedlisko

Area
  - Total: 92.19 km^{2} (35.59 sq mi)

Population (2019-06-30)
  - Total: 3,593
  - Density: 38.97/km^{2} (100.9/sq mi)
- Website: http://www.siedlisko.pl

Gmina Siedlisko is a rural gmina (administrative district) in Nowa Sól County, Lubusz Voivodeship, in western Poland. Its seat is the village of Siedlisko, which lies approximately 8 kilometres (5 mi) south-east of Nowa Sól and 29 km (18 mi) south-east of Zielona Góra.

The gmina covers an area of 92.19 square kilometres (35.6 sq mi), and as of 2019 its total population is 3,593.

== Villages ==
Gmina Siedlisko contains the villages and settlements of Bielawy, Borowiec, Dębianka, Kierzno, Piękne Kąty, Radocin, Różanówka, Siedlisko, Ustronie and Zwierzyniec.

== Neighbouring gminas ==
Gmina Siedlisko is bordered by the gminas of Bytom Odrzański, Kotla, Nowa Sól, Sława and Żukowice.
