= Wrociszów =

- Village
- Location within Poland
- Coordinates: 51°46′N 15°38′E
- Country: Poland
- Voivodeship: Lubusz
- County: Nowa Sól
- Gmina: Nowa Sól

Wrociszów [vrɔˈt͡ɕiʂuf] is a village in the administrative district of Gmina Nowa Sól, within Nowa Sól County, Lubusz Voivodeship, in western Poland.
