= Jeziorna =

Jeziorna may refer to the following places:

- Jeziorna, Łódź Voivodeship (central Poland)
- Jeziorna, Lubusz Voivodeship (west Poland)
- Jeziorna, West Pomeranian Voivodeship (north-west Poland)
