= Bobrowniki, Lubusz Voivodeship =

Bobrowniki
- Village
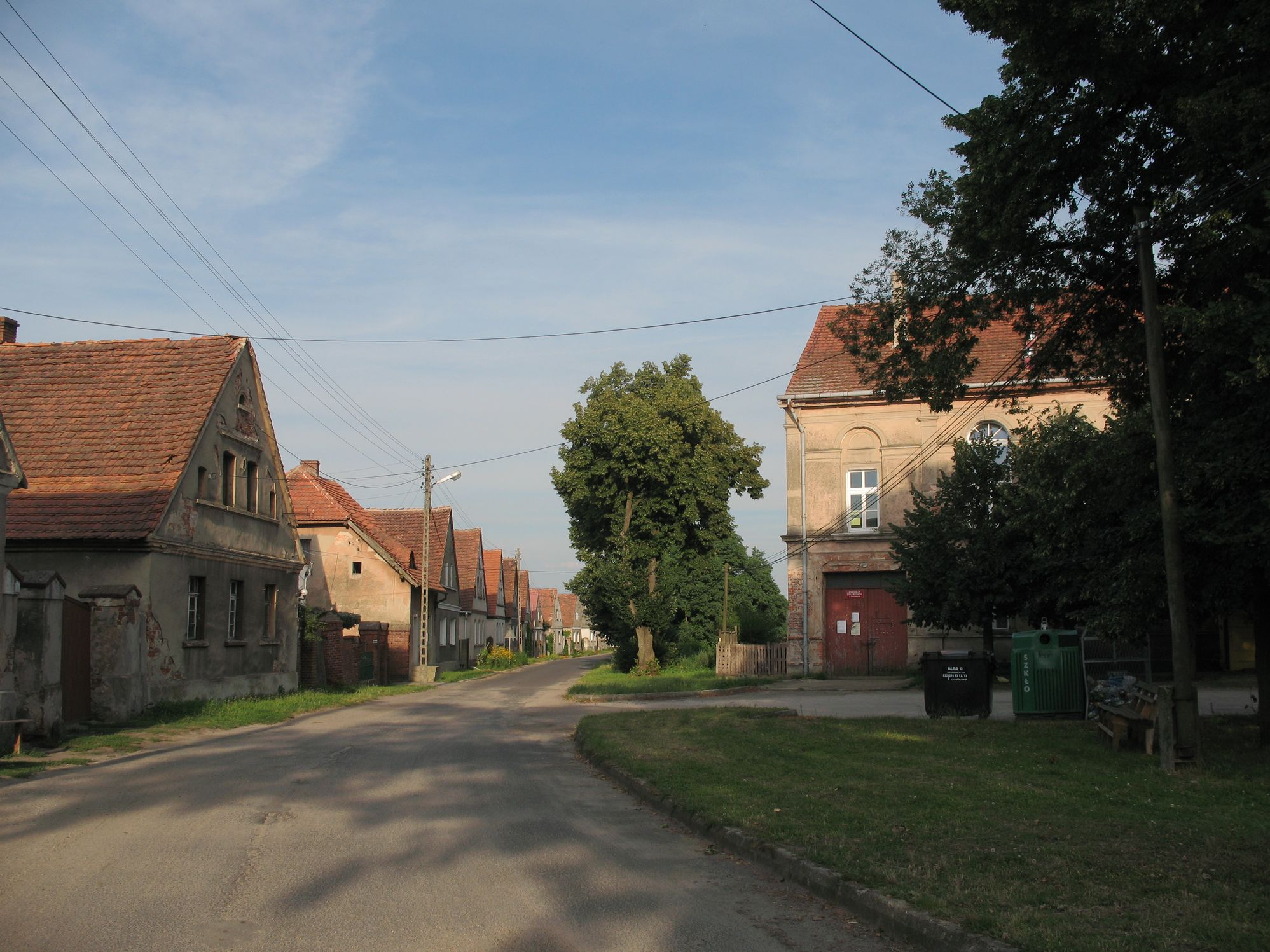

- Location within Poland
- Coordinates: 51°51′54″N 15°43′48″E
- Country: Poland
- Voivodeship: Lubusz
- County: Nowa Sól
- Gmina: Otyń
- Population: 650

Bobrowniki [bɔbrɔvˈniki] is a village in the administrative district of Gmina Otyń, within Nowa Sól County, Lubusz Voivodeship, in western Poland.
