= Stany, Lubusz Voivodeship =

Village in Lubusz Voivodeship, western Poland

Stany
- Village
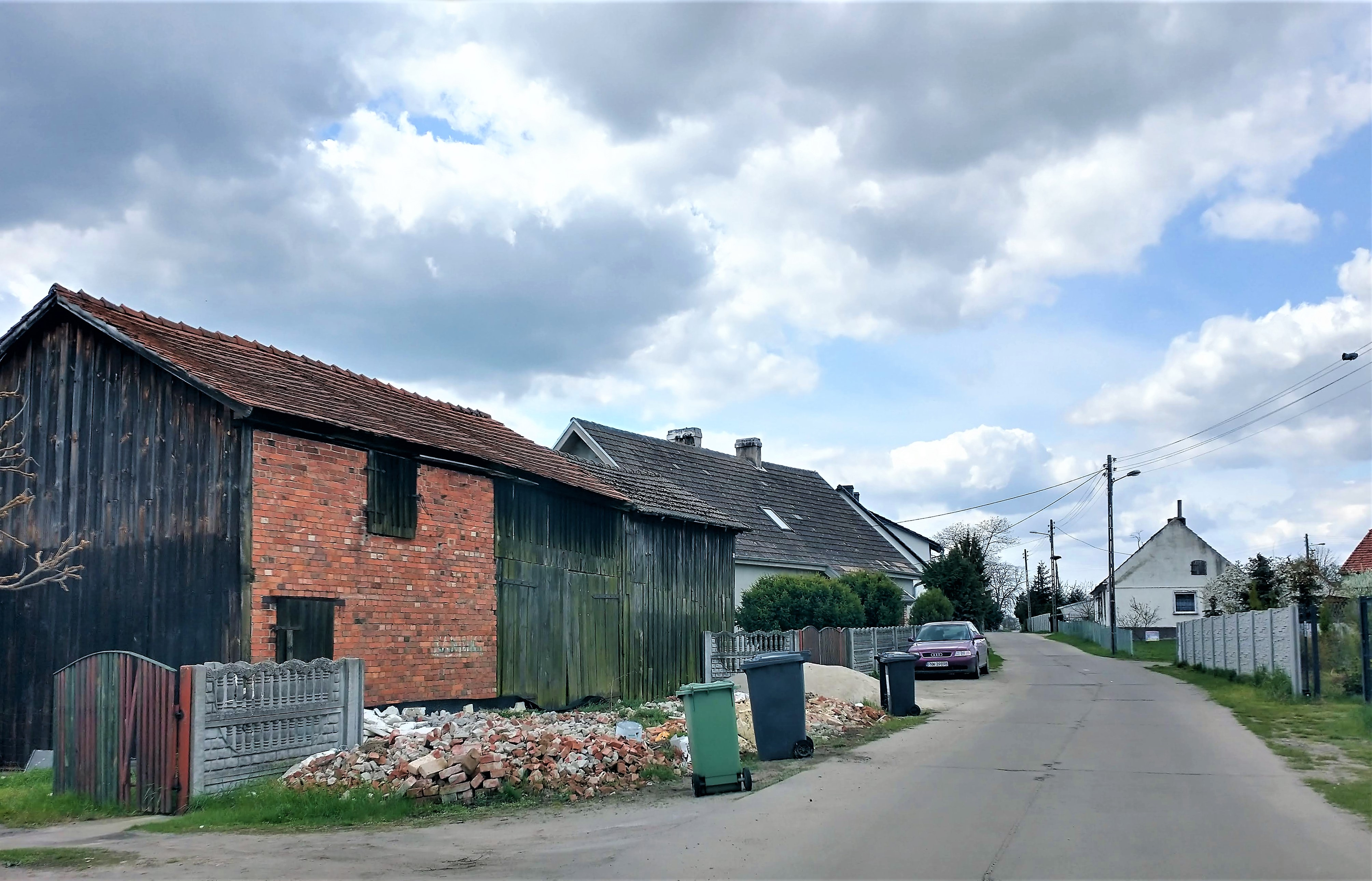

- Location within Poland
- Coordinates: 51°50′40″N 15°46′54″E
- Country: Poland
- Voivodeship: Lubusz
- County: Nowa Sól
- Gmina: Nowa Sól

Stany [ˈstanɨ] is a village in the administrative district of Gmina Nowa Sól, within Nowa Sól County, Lubusz Voivodeship, in western Poland.
