= Ciepielów =

Ciepielów may refer to the following places in Poland:

- Ciepielów, Lubusz Voivodeship (west Poland)
- Ciepielów, Masovian Voivodeship (east-central Poland)
- Ciepielów, a village near Slonim, (Belarus)

== See also ==
- Massacre in Ciepielów
