= Walter Thor =

German painter and illustrator (1870–1929)

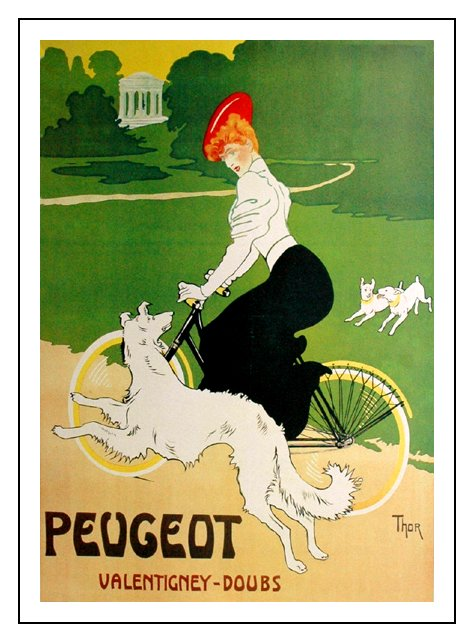
Affiche Peugeot by Walter Thor

Walter Thor (1870 in Neusalz – 1929 in Munich) was a German painter and illustrator.

He studied at the Academy of Fine Arts, Munich and worked for some time in Paris.

He mainly drew commercial posters in the Art nouveau style with a humorous touch, but also produced some oil paintings. His works include French automotive related posters such as Pneu Vital, Griffon, Automotive Barré, Darracq and Automotive Unic. or cakes
