= Bogdan Bojko =

Polish politician (born 1959)

member of Sejm 2005–2007
- Incumbent
- Assumed office 25 September 2005

Personal details
- Born: 10 February 1959 (age 67)
- Party: Civic Platform

Bogdan Bojko ['bɔɡdan ˈbɔjkɔ] (born 10 February 1959 in Nowa Sól) is a Polish politician. He was elected to the Sejm on 25 September 2005, receiving 5,123 votes in 8 Zielona Góra district as a candidate on the Civic Platform list.

== See also ==
- Members of Polish Sejm 2005-2007
