= Otyń =

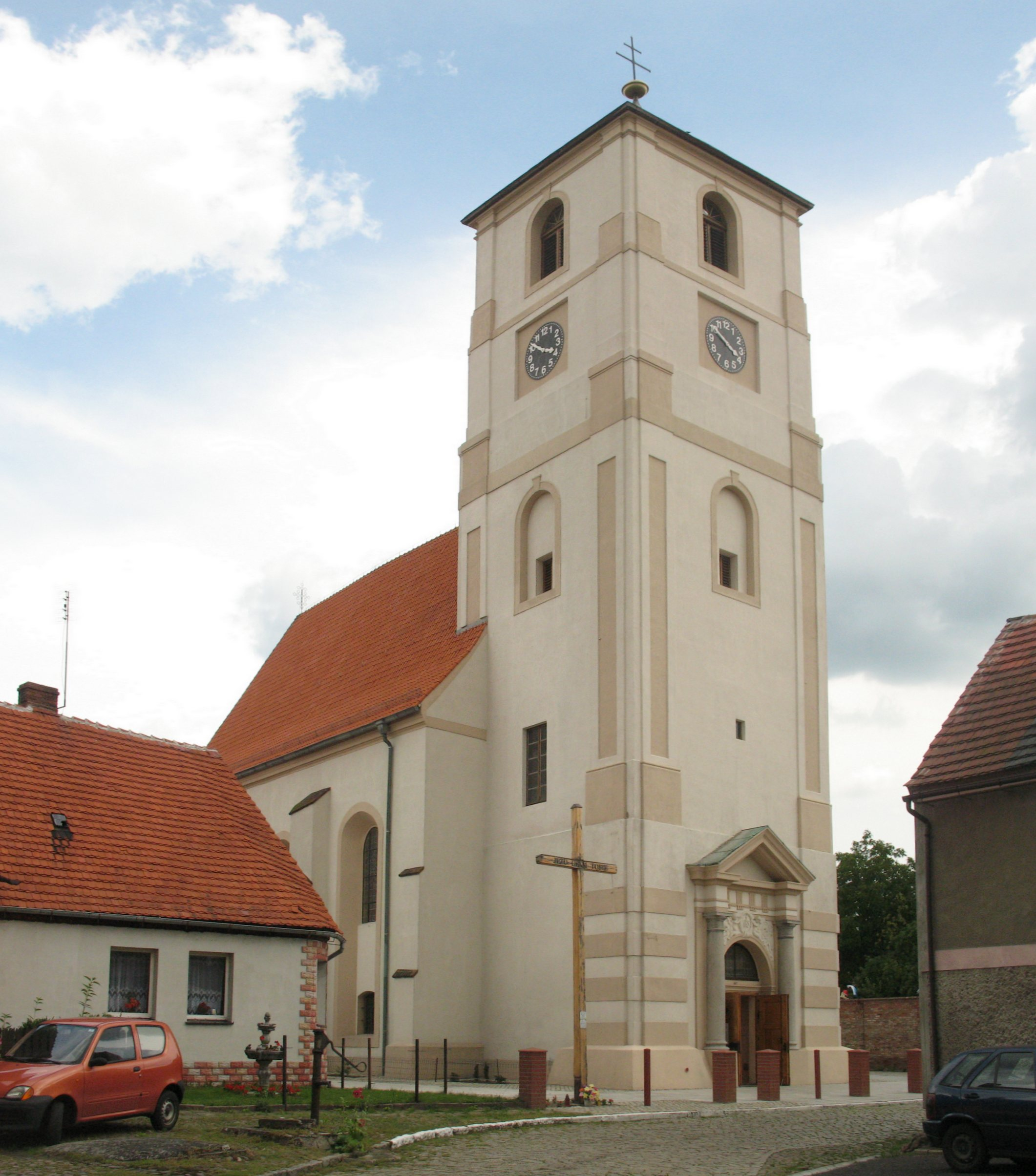
- Main church

- Flag Coat of arms

- Location within Poland
- Coordinates: 51°50′50″N 15°42′35″E
- Country: Poland
- Voivodeship: Lubusz
- County: Nowa Sól
- Gmina: Otyń

Government
  - Mayor: Barbara Zofia Wróblewska

Area
  - Total: 8.11 km^{2} (3.13 sq mi)

Population (2019-06-30)
  - Total: 1,615
  - Density: 199/km^{2} (516/sq mi)
- Time zone: UTC+1 (CET)
  - Summer (DST): UTC+2 (CEST)
- Postal code: 67-106
- Area code: +48 68
- Vehicle registration: FNW
- Website: http://www.otyn.pl/

Otyń [ˈɔtɨɲ] (German: Deutsch-Wartenberg) is a town in western Poland, located in the Nowa Sól County, Lubusz Voivodeship. As of 2019 it has 1,615 inhabitants.

== History ==
Otyń was mentioned in 1313. Otyń was located under Polish law, it belonged to the Polish Duchy of Głogów under the Piast dynasty.

Since the late Middle Ages, the town has changed owners many times, it was even the object of armed conflicts. It suffered during the Thirty Years' War, when it was occupied by different armies. It did not have defensive walls, which ironically saved it from serious damage, because there was no need to besiege or storm it. Protestants were oppressed during the Austrian occupation and Catholics were oppressed during the Swedish occupation. Ultimately, Catholicism reigned in the city after the war.

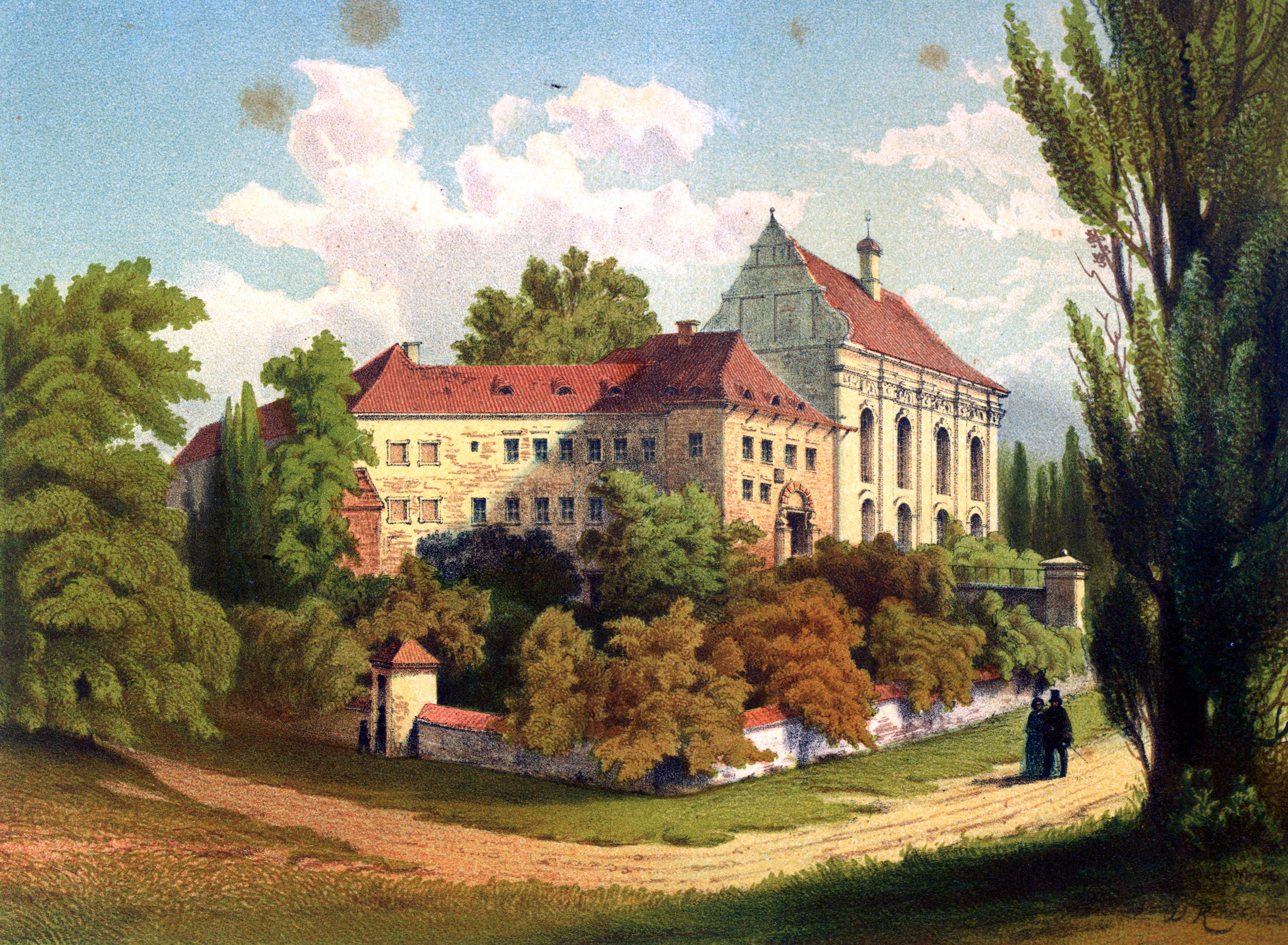
19th-century view of the palace

The Gothic palace and church of Otyń were a property of the Society of Jesus from 1661 until its suppression in 1776, Duke Peter von Biron of Courland and Semigallia bought it in 1787 and called the place Deutsch-Wartenberg to distinguish it from his estates in Syców (German: Polnisch Wartenberg). After his death in 1800 his daughter Dorothea inherited Otyń, her children sold one part to the former Prussian minister Karl Rudolf Friedenthal in 1879, while the other part went to the Radziwiłł family and later to the House of Czartoryski. In the 18th and 19th centuries, the town was a pilgrimage destination for Catholics from both Lower Silesia and Greater Poland.

During World War II, Germans imprisoned Polish forced laborers in the town. In the autumn of 1944, both residents and forced laborers were directed by the Germans to fortification works on the Oder river.

== Demographics ==
Historical population

Year	Pop.	±%
1816	878	—
1843	883	+0.6%
1871	896	+1.5%
1880	902	+0.7%
1890	849	−5.9%

Year	Pop.	±%
1900	1,001	+17.9%
1910	853	−14.8%
1925	806	−5.5%
1939	926	+14.9%

== Twin towns – sister cities ==
See twin towns of Gmina Otyń.
