= Nowe Żabno =

- Village
- Location within Poland
- Coordinates: 51°45′45″N 15°42′50″E
- Country: Poland
- Voivodeship: Lubusz
- County: Nowa Sól
- Gmina: Nowa Sól

Nowe Żabno [ˈnɔvɛ ˈʐabnɔ] is a village in the administrative district of Gmina Nowa Sól, within Nowa Sól County, Lubusz Voivodeship, in western Poland.
