= Kolsko =

- Village
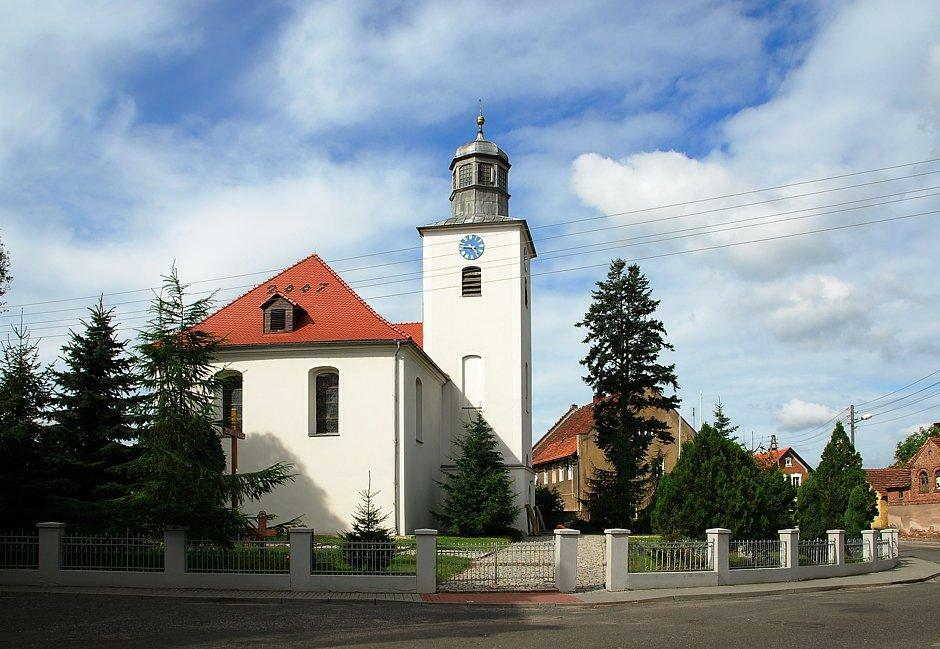
- Church of the Nativity of Saint John the Baptist

- Location within Poland
- Coordinates: 51°58′N 15°58′E
- Country: Poland
- Voivodeship: Lubusz
- County: Nowa Sól
- Gmina: Kolsko

Population (approx.)
  - Total: 1,000
- Website: http://www.kolsko.pl

Kolsko [ˈkɔlskɔ] is a village in Nowa Sól County, Lubusz Voivodeship, in western Poland. It is the seat of the gmina (administrative district) called Gmina Kolsko.

== Transport ==
Kolsko is bypassed by vovoideship road 315 to the east.

The nearest railway station is in Wolsztyn.
