= Ciepielów, Lubusz Voivodeship =

Ciepielów
- Village
- Location within Poland
- Coordinates: 51°45′46″N 15°40′33″E
- Country: Poland
- Voivodeship: Lubusz
- County: Nowa Sól
- Gmina: Nowa Sól

Ciepielów [t͡ɕɛˈpjɛluf] is a village in the administrative district of Gmina Nowa Sól, within Nowa Sól County, Lubusz Voivodeship, in western Poland.
