= Jodłów, Lubusz Voivodeship =

Jodłów
- Village
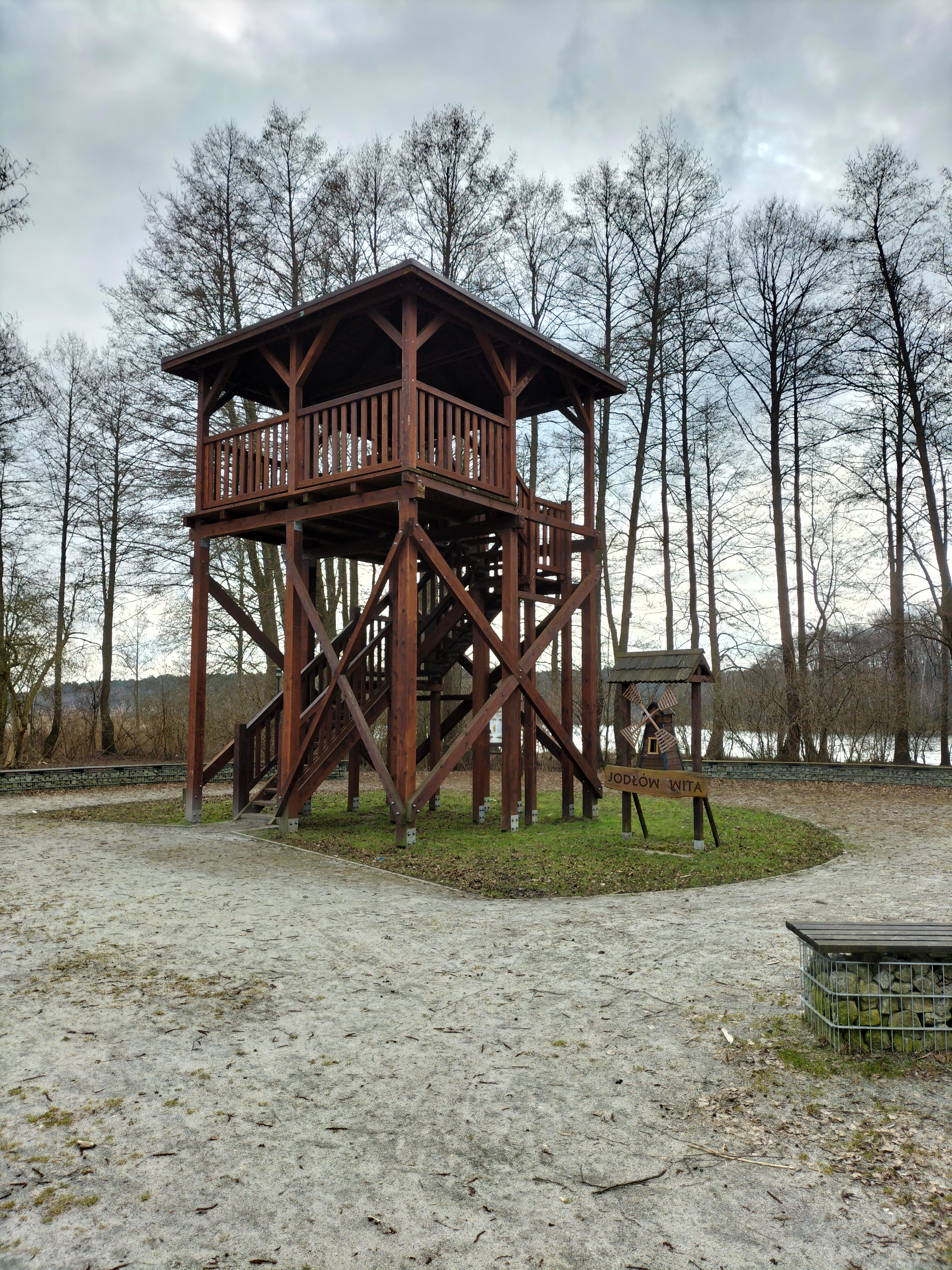
- Observations tower

- Location within Poland
- Coordinates: 51°52′38″N 15°57′31″E
- Country: Poland
- Voivodeship: Lubusz
- County: Nowa Sól
- Gmina: Nowa Sól

Jodłów [ˈjɔdwuf] is a village in the administrative district of Gmina Nowa Sól, within Nowa Sól County, Lubusz Voivodeship, in western Poland.
