= Chełmek, Lubusz Voivodeship =

Chełmek
- Village
- Location within Poland
- Coordinates: 51°52′50″N 15°52′43″E
- Country: Poland
- Voivodeship: Lubusz
- County: Nowa Sól
- Gmina: Nowa Sól
- Time zone: UTC+1 (CET)
  - Summer (DST): UTC+2 (CEST)
- Vehicle registration: FNW

Chełmek [ˈxɛu̯mɛk] is a village in the administrative district of Gmina Nowa Sól, within Nowa Sól County, Lubusz Voivodeship, in western Poland.
