= Nowa Sól =

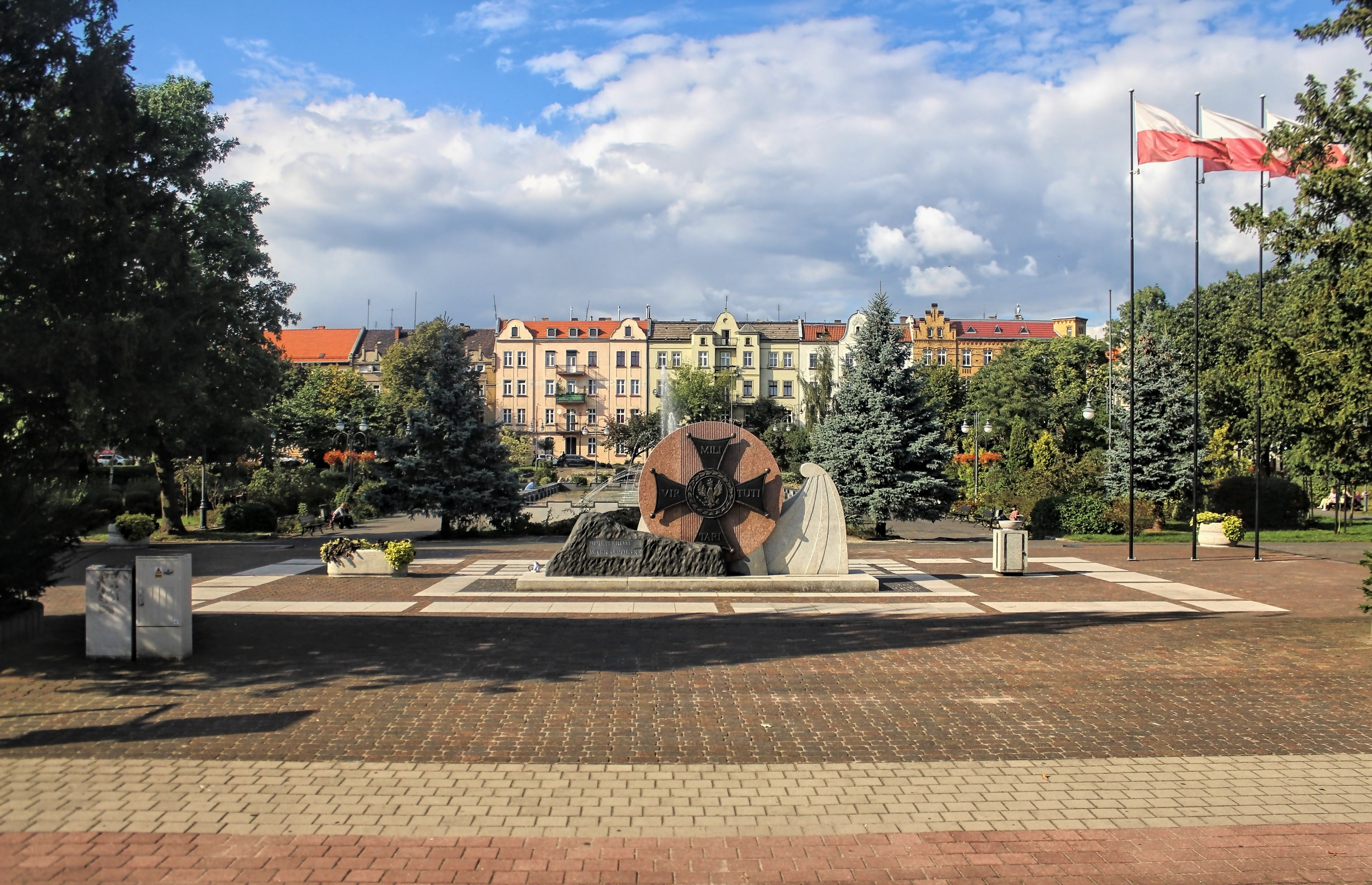

- Flag Coat of arms

- Location within Poland
- Coordinates: 51°48′N 15°43′E
- Country: Poland
- Voivodeship: Lubusz
- County: Nowa Sól
- Gmina: Nowa Sól (urban gmina)

Government
  - City mayor: Beata Kulczycka

Area
  - Total: 21.56 km^{2} (8.32 sq mi)

Population (31 December 2025)
  - Total: 35,230
  - Density: 1,634/km^{2} (4,232/sq mi)
- Time zone: UTC+1 (CET)
  - Summer (DST): UTC+2 (CEST)
- Postal code: 67-100 to 67-103
- Car plates: FNW
- Website: nowasol.pl

Nowa Sól (Note: lit. 'New Salt'; Polish pronunciation: [ˈnɔva ˈsul]; Silesian: Steuer's Silesian alphabet: Nowŏ Sōl, Silesian Pro Loquela Silesiana alphabet: Nowo Sůl; German until 1945: Neusalz an der Oder) is a city on the Oder River in Lubusz Voivodeship, western Poland. It is the capital of Nowa Sól County and had a population of 35,230 (2025).

== History ==
The territory became part of the emerging Polish state in the 10th century, and following the country's fragmentation it formed part of the Duchy of Głogów since 1251, ruled by the Piast and Jagiellonian dynasties, including future Polish Kings John I Albert and Sigismund I the Old. The first mention of the settlement in the region of modern Nowa Sól dates back to the 14th century. The Latin book Liber fundationis episcopatus Vratislaviensis (Polish: Księga uposażeń biskupstwa wrocławskiego) records two Slavic Polish settlements of Stare Żabno mentioned as Sczhabna antiqua and Nowe Żabno as Sczhabna nova. The former is currently a suburb of Nowa Sól and the latter still exists as a village. In 1506, the territory was incorporated into the Kingdom of Bohemia, part of the Holy Roman Empire.

In order to break Silesia's dependency on salt from Poland, Emperor Ferdinand I founded the demesne land Zum Neuen Saltze in 1563. The sea salt, originally from La Rochelle and the Iberian coast, was transported from Hamburg and Stettin (Szczecin) along the navigable Oder. A flood in 1573 led to the relocation of the salt refinery to the nearby village of Modritz (Modrzyca); the office of the administrator is now the town hall. The settlement was documented as Neusalzburg ("New Salzburg") in 1585 and later as Neusalz ("New Salt"). A trading harbor was built on the Oder in 1592. The Protestant Church of St. Michael, built from 1591 to 1597, was converted to Roman Catholicism in 1654.

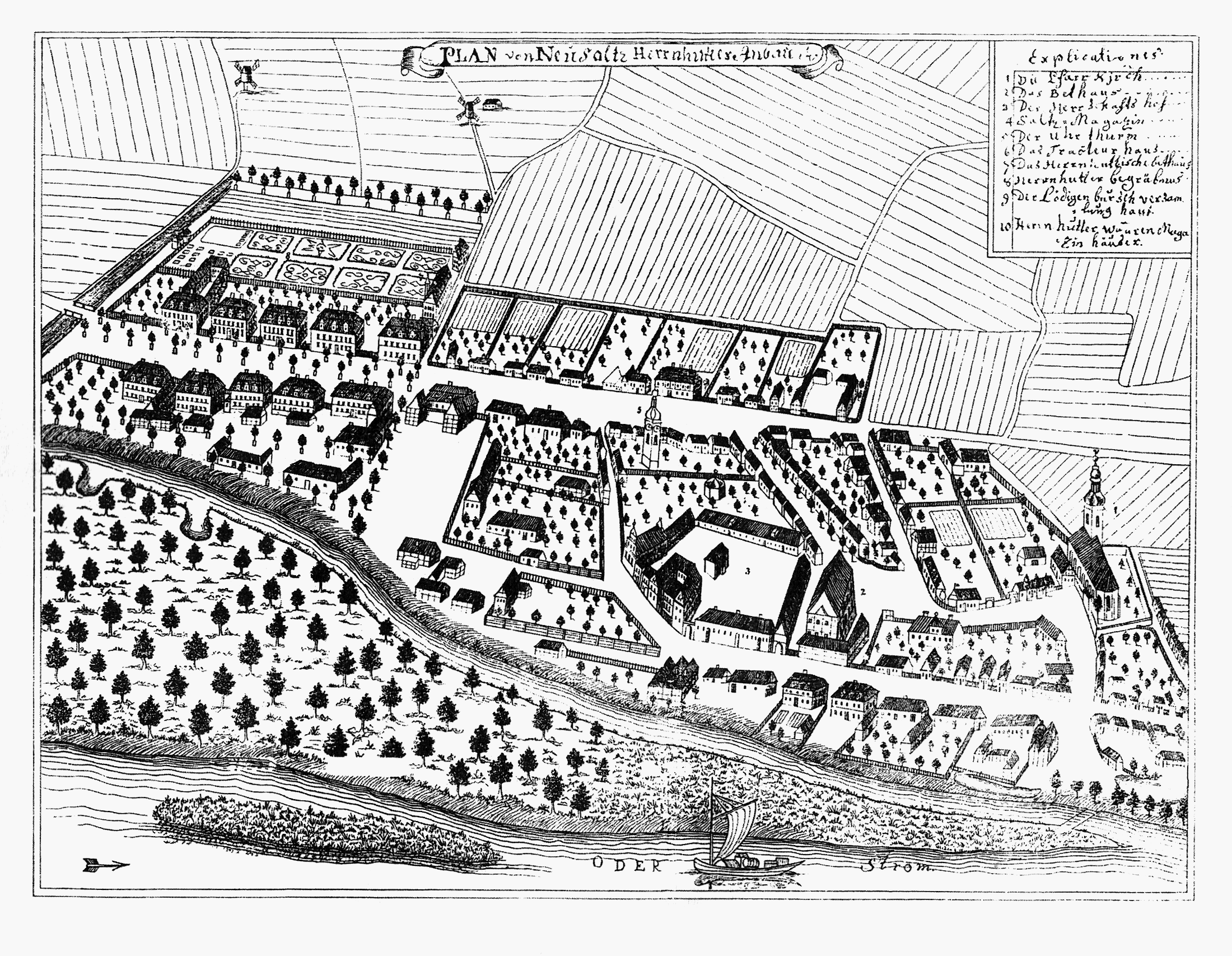
Neusalz in the 18th century

The entrance of Dutch and English merchants in the Baltic Sea at the end of the 16th century led to difficulties in the supply of unrefined salt. The unprofitable enterprise was also hampered by tolls on the Oder imposed by the Margraviate of Brandenburg. Salt refining in Neusalz nearly collapsed during the Thirty Years' War (1618–48), while recovery was hampered by the salt trade of Brandenburg and Poland afterwards. As the rulers of Swedish Pomerania, Sweden prevented salt from reaching the town from Stettin in 1710. Three years later Neusalz became an outpost for salt from Magdeburg and Halle.

Neusalz developed into one of the largest ports on the Silesian Oder and handled the majority of salt traffic on the river. It was annexed by the Kingdom of Prussia in 1742 according to the Treaty of Breslau. When King Frederick II of Prussia granted Neusalz town rights on 9 October 1743 and initiated plans to expand the town, it had 97 houses. A colony of the Moravian Church was founded in 1744. After the Battle of Kunersdorf, Neusalz was plundered on 24 September 1759. Forty houses were burnt down, as was the Moravian community, which was restored in 1763.

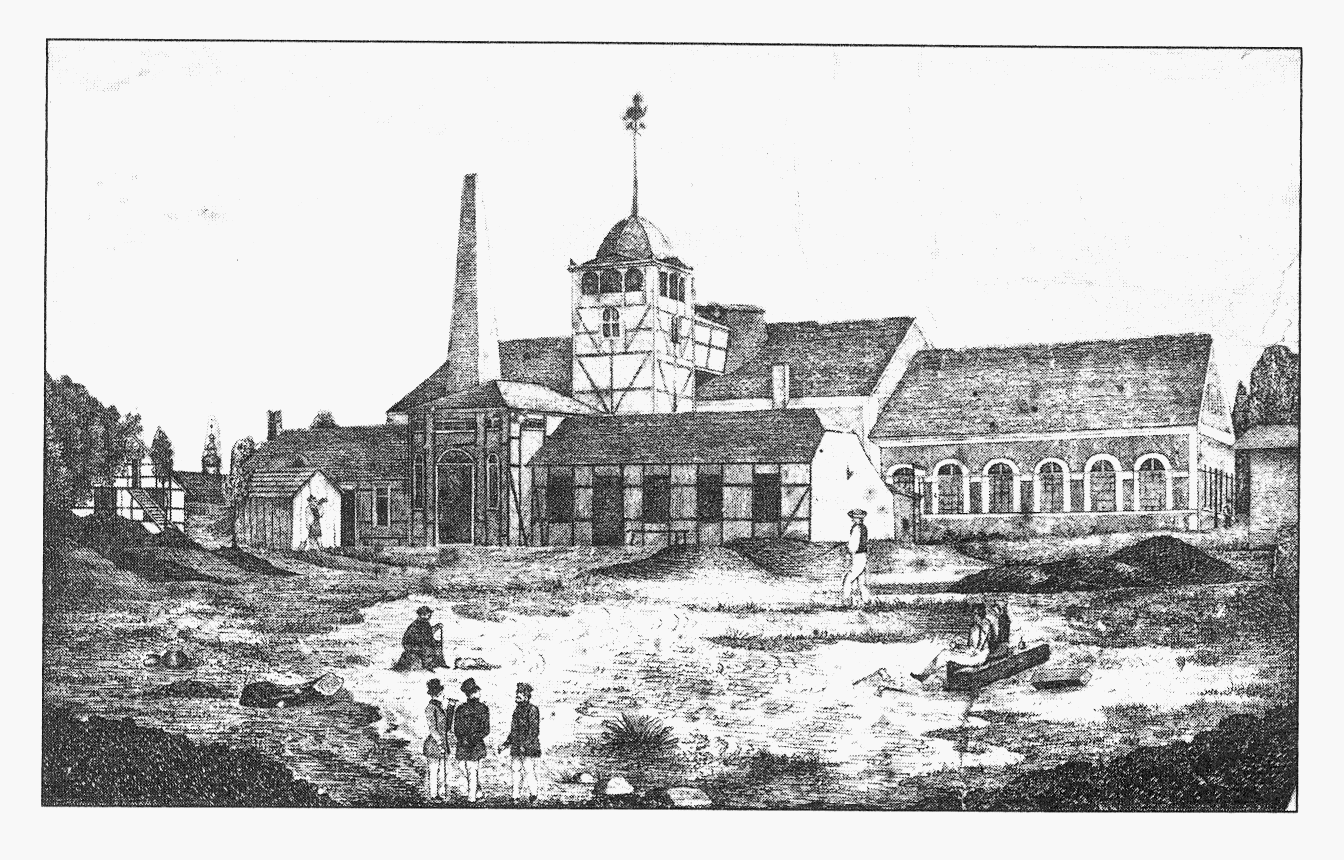
Steelworks in c. 1860

Neusalz was administered within Landkreis Freystadt i. Niederschles. in Prussian Silesia after the Napoleonic Wars. The modern industrial development began in the 19th century when new factories, especially linen factories and steelworks, were opened. Neusalz was first connected to the Silesian railway in 1871, the same year the town became part of the German Empire during the unification of Germany. Expansion and modernization of the harbor began on 11 October 1897. Neusalz became part of the Prussian Province of Lower Silesia in 1919. A wooden bridge across the Oder, originally built in 1870, was rebuilt using reinforced concrete in 1932.

During World War II the town was the site of a forced labor subcamp of the Gross-Rosen concentration camp, whose prisoners were Jewish women from occupied Poland, Czechoslovakia and Germany. During the final stages of the war, in January 1945, remaining prisoners were sent on a German-perpetrated death march towards Krzystkowice, with one woman escaping and returning to the town, where she was then sheltered by the remaining Polish forced laborers. German troops destroyed the concrete bridge on 9 February 1945, but the Soviet Red Army entered Neusalz on 13/14 February 1945. A number of buildings burnt down, including the Catholic Church.

Nowa Sól was rebuilt as an industrial and administrative center, superseding nearby Kożuchów. From 1975 to 1998 it was in the Zielona Gora Voivodeship, after which it became part of the Lubusz Voivodeship. The town is featured in the documentary 5000 Miles, about a family from Wisconsin in the United States wishing to adopt a Polish child.

== Population ==
Historical population

Year	Pop.	±%
1743	800	—
1787	1,503	+87.9%
1825	2,211	+47.1%
1868	5,109	+131.1%
1880	6,756	+32.2%
1890	9,075	+34.3%
1900	12,580	+38.6%

Year	Pop.	±%
1910	13,474	+7.1%
1925	14,166	+5.1%
1939	17,326	+22.3%
1950	17,046	−1.6%
1960	26,620	+56.2%
1970	33,386	+25.4%

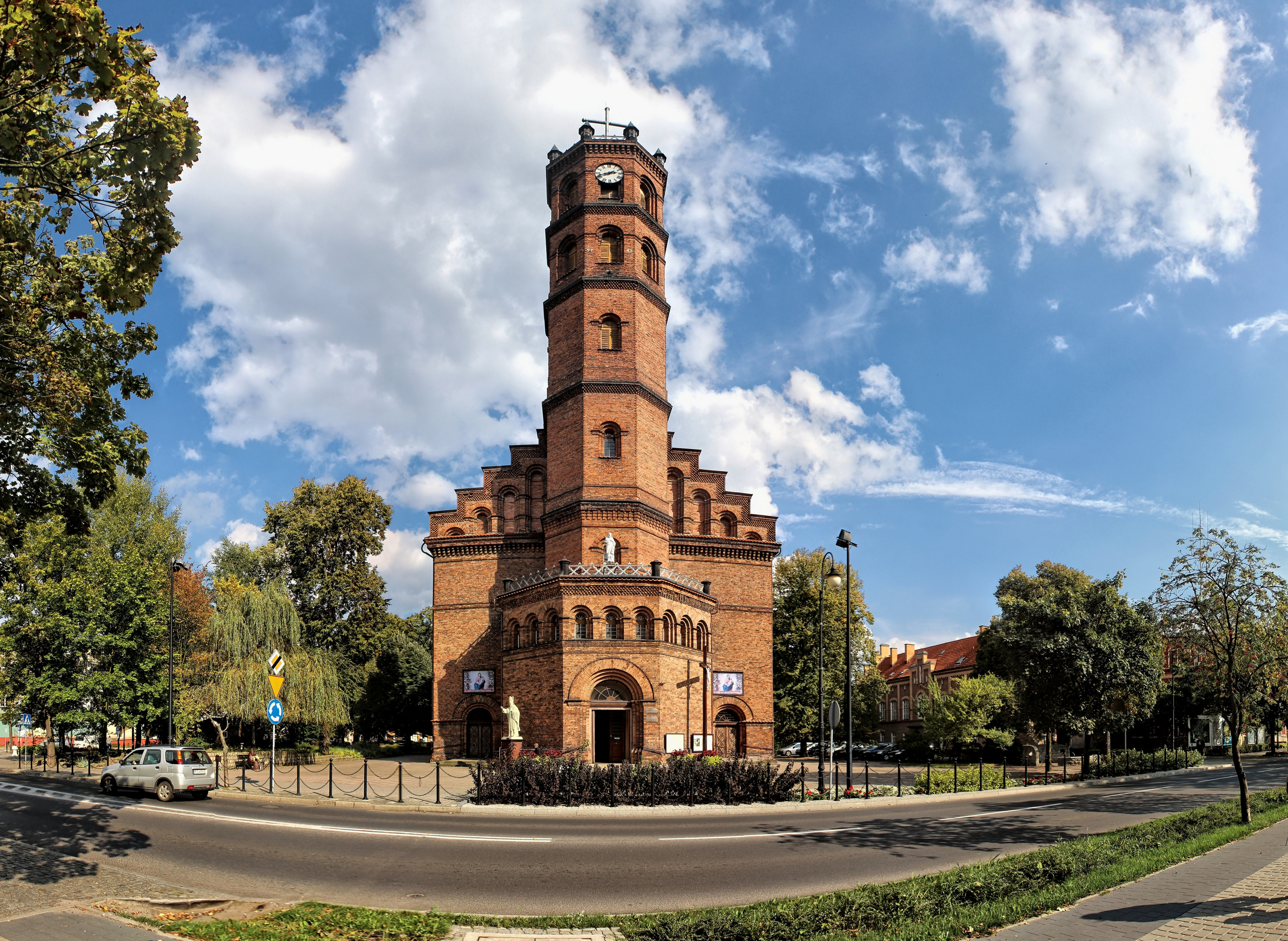
Saint Anthony's Catholic Church

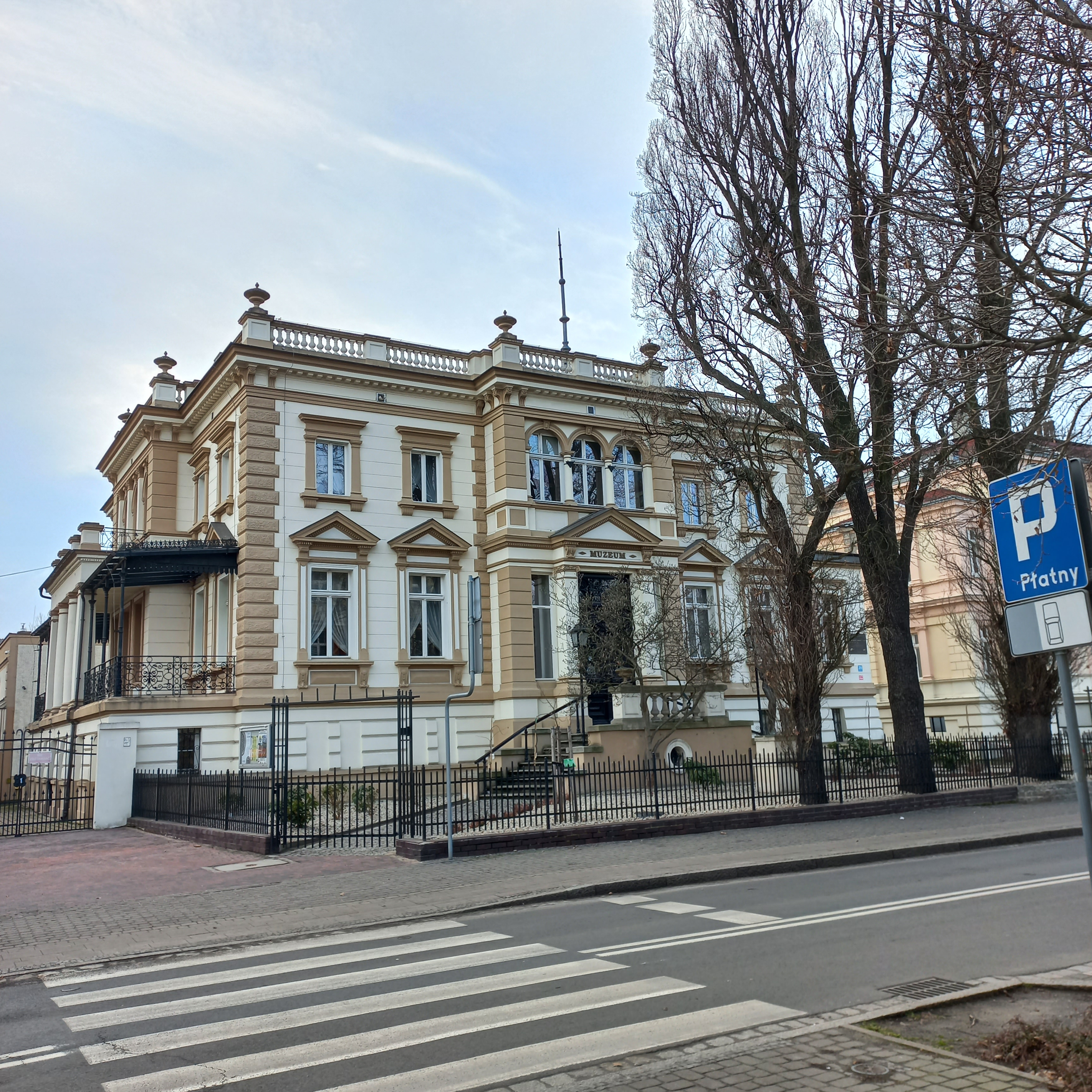
Municipal Museum

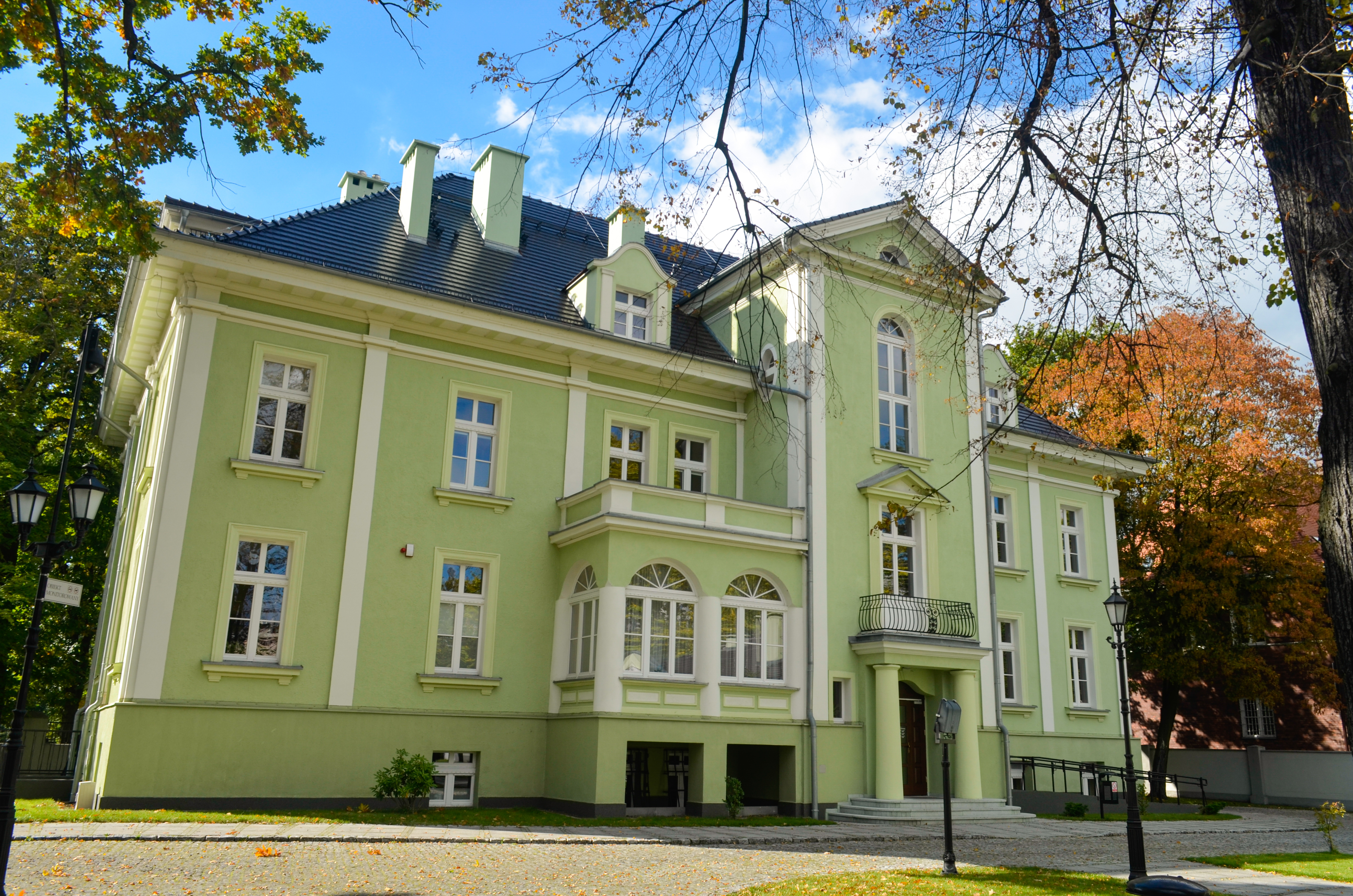
Municipal Public Library

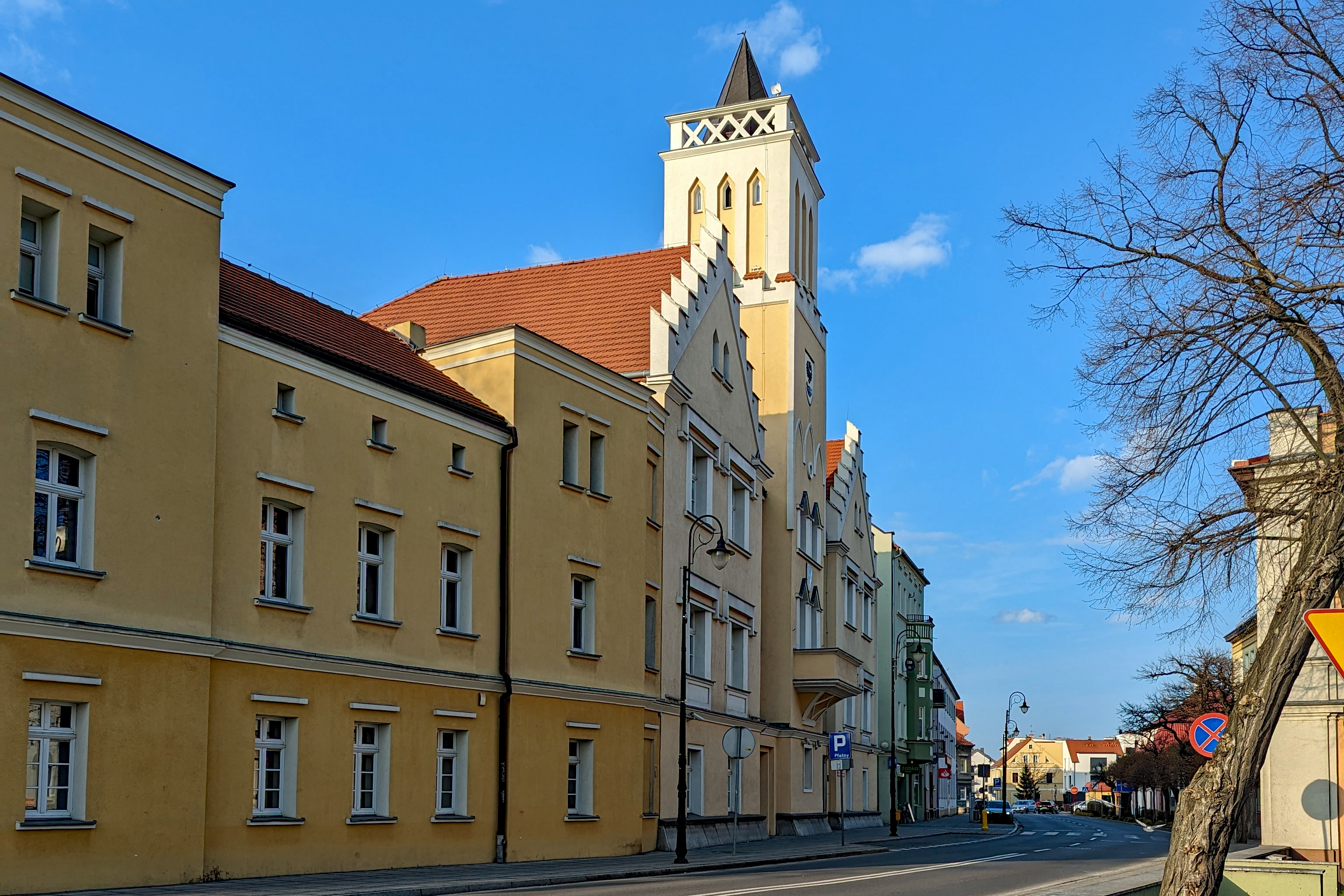
City Hall

== Sports ==
The city's professional sports club is volleyball team Astra Nowa Sól, which competes in the I liga (2nd tier).

== Notable people ==
- Christian David Gebauer (1777–1831), painter
- Gustav A. Schneebeli (1853–1923), politician
- Otto Jaekel (1863–1929), paleontologist
- Walter Thor (1870–1929), German painter and illustrator
- Alfred Saalwächter (1883–1945), General Admiral executed for war crimes
- Friedrich Zehm (1923–2007), German classical composer
- Natias Neutert (born 1941), German artist
- Seweryn Krajewski (born 1947), musician
- Janusz Liberkowski (born 1953), winner of the first season of American Inventor
- Józef Młynarczyk (born 1953), footballer
- Bogdan Bojko (born 1959), politician
- Waldemar Zboralski (born 1960), gay rights activist
- Marcin Oleksy (born 1987), amputee footballer, 2022 FIFA Puskás Award
- Adam Stefanow (born 1994), snooker player

== Twin towns – sister cities ==
Nowa Sól is twinned with:

- Achim, Germany
- Fresagrandinaria, Italy
- Püttlingen, Germany
- Saint-Michel-sur-Orge, France
- Senftenberg, Germany
- Veszprém, Hungary
- Žamberk, Czech Republic
