= Nowa Sól County =

Nowa Sól County Powiat nowosolski
- County
- Flag Coat of arms

- Location within the voivodeship

- Division into gminas
- Coordinates (Nowa Sól): 51°48′N 15°43′E
- Country: Poland
- Voivodeship: Lubusz
- Seat: Nowa Sól
- Gminas: Total 8 (incl. 1 urban): Nowa Sól; Gmina Bytom Odrzański; Gmina Kolsko; Gmina Kożuchów; Gmina Nowa Sól; Gmina Nowe Miasteczko; Gmina Otyń; Gmina Siedlisko

Area
  - Total: 770.58 km^{2} (297.52 sq mi)

Population (2019-06-30)
  - Total: 86,384
  - Density: 112.10/km^{2} (290.34/sq mi)
  - Urban: 56,873
  - Rural: 29,511
- Car plates: FNW
- Website: http://www.powiat-nowosolski.pl

Nowa Sól County (Polish: powiat nowosolski) is a unit of territorial administration and local government (powiat) in Lubusz Voivodeship, western Poland. It came into being on January 1, 1999, as a result of the Polish local government reforms passed in 1998. Its administrative seat and largest town is Nowa Sól, which lies 22 km (14 mi) south-east of Zielona Góra and 109 km (68 mi) south of Gorzów Wielkopolski. The county contains three other towns: Kożuchów, lying 10 km (6 mi) south-west of Nowa Sól, Bytom Odrzański, lying 11 km (7 mi) south-east of Nowa Sól, and Nowe Miasteczko, 13 km (8 mi) south of Nowa Sól.

The county covers an area of 770.58 square kilometres (297.5 sq mi). As of 2019 its total population is 86,384. The most populated towns are Nowa Sól with 38,763 inhabitants and Kożuchów with 9,432 inhabitants.

From 1999 until 2002, Nowa Sól County also included the areas which now comprise Wschowa County (the towns and gminas of Wschowa, Sława and Szlichtyngowa).

== Neighbouring counties ==
Nowa Sól County is bordered by Wolsztyn County to the north-east, Wschowa County and Głogów County to the east, Żagań County to the south-west, and Zielona Góra County to the north-west.

== Administrative divisions ==
The county is subdivided into eight gminas (one urban, three urban-rural and four rural). These are listed in the following table, in descending order of population.

Gmina	Type	Area (km^{2})	Population (2019)	Seat
Nowa Sól	urban	21.6	38,763	
Gmina Kożuchów	urban-rural	178.8	15,962	Kożuchów
Gmina Otyń	rural	91.6	6,986	Otyń
Gmina Nowa Sól	rural	176.2	6,959	Nowa Sól*
Gmina Bytom Odrzański	urban-rural	52.4	5,424	Bytom Odrzański
Gmina Nowe Miasteczko	urban-rural	77.2	5,377	Nowe Miasteczko
Gmina Siedlisko	rural	92.2	3,593	Siedlisko
Gmina Kolsko	rural	80.6	3,320	Kolsko
* seat not part of the gmina
