= Memorial to the Soldiers of the Military Gendarmerie =

Monument in Warsaw, Poland

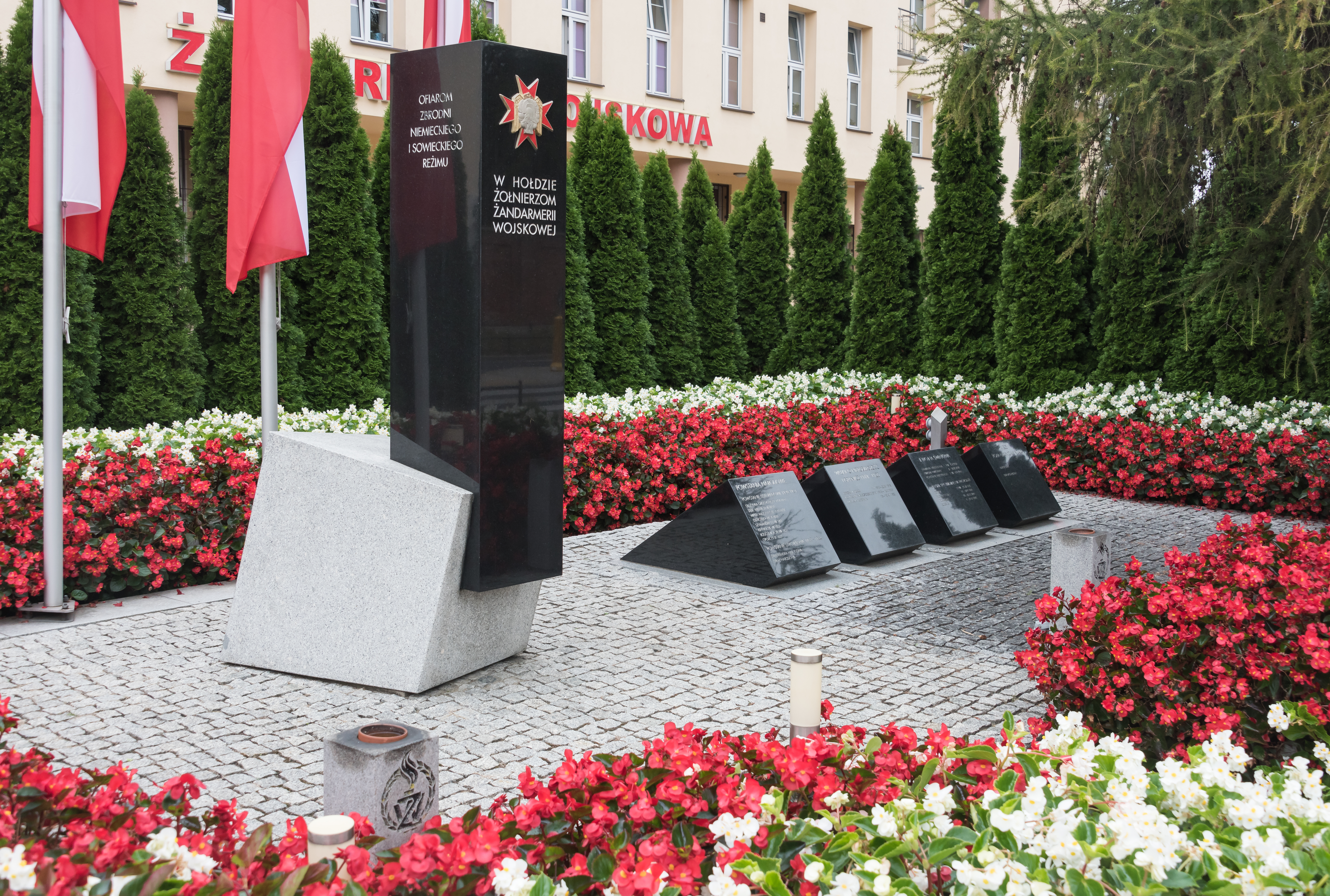
- The monument in 2023.
- Interactive map of Memorial to the Soldiers of the Military Gendarmerie
- Location: 35 Ostroroga Street, Wola, Warsaw, Poland
- Coordinates: 52°14′56.62″N 20°57′54.14″E
- Designer: Marek Moderau
- Type: Monument
- Opening date: 28 May 2013

The Memorial to the Soldiers of the Military Gendarmerie (Polish: Pomnik w hołdzie żołnierzom Żandarmerii Wojskowej) is a monument in Warsaw, Poland, within the Wola district. It is placed in front of the headquarters of the Military Gendarmerie at 35 Ostroroga Street, within the neighbourhood of Młynów. It is dedicated to the soldiers of the Military Gendarmerie, who fell in conflicts fought by Poland and Polish people since the 19th century. It includes the November Uprising, January Uprising, Polish–Ukrainian War, Greater Poland Upising, Polish–Soviet War, Second World War, as well their participation in the United Nations Disengagement Observer Force in Syria, and International Security Assistance Force in Afghanistan. The monument was designed by Marek Moderau, and unveiled on 28 May 2013.

== History ==
The monument is dedicated to the soldiers of the Military Gendarmerie, who fell in conflicts fought by Poland and Polish people since the 19th century. It includes the November Uprising, January Uprising, Polish–Ukrainian War, Greater Poland Upising, Polish–Soviet War, Second World War, as well their participation in the United Nations Disengagement Observer Force in Syria, and International Security Assistance Force in Afghanistan. The monument was designed by Marek Moderau. It was unveiled on 28 May 2013, a day prior to the Day of the Veterans of the Operations Outside the State Borders. The ceremony was attended by Zbigniew Włosowicz, the deputy director of the National Security Bureau, Piotr Lis, the general director of the Ministry of National Defence, Andrzej Kunert, the secretary of the Council for the Protection of Struggle and Martyrdom Sites, and division general Mirosław Rozmus, the commander-in-chief of the Military Gendarmerie.

== Characteristics ==
The monument consists of 5 stone elements arranged in a row. The first takes a form of a tall cuboid, featuring the insignia of the Military Gendarmerie, as well as inscriptions in Polish, which read "W hołdzie żołnierzą Żandarmerii Wojskowej", and "Ofiarą zbrodni niemieckiego i sowieckiego reżimu". They translate to "In memory to the soldiers of the Military Gendarmerie", and "To the victims of the crimes of German and Soviet regimes", respectively. It is followed by four smaller prism, with inscriptions dedication the monument to the soldiers of the Military Gendarmerie who fought in numerous conflicts involving Poland. This includes the insurrections against the Russian Empire in the 19th century, in form of the November Uprising and January Uprising, the conflicts during the formation of the Second Polish Republic in the early 20th century, including the Polish–Ukrainian War, the Greater Poland Uprising, and the Polish–Soviet War, the involvement of Poland in the Second World War, and its participation in the United Nations Disengagement Observer Force in Syria, and International Security Assistance Force in Afghanistan in the 20th century.

The first tablet reads:

Polish inscription

Powstania Narodowe

Powstanie listopadowe 1830–1831
Olszynka Grochowska 25 II 1831
Dębe Wielkie 31 III 1831
Mińsk Mazowiecki 26 IV 1831
Ostrołęka 26 VI 1831
Szymanów 15 VIII 1831
Krynka 28 VIII 1831
Rogoźnica 29 VIII 1831
Opole 15 IX 1831

Powstanie styczniowe 1863–1864
Żandarmeria Narodowa
Straż Narodowa

Translation:
English translation

National Uprisings

November Uprising 1830–1831
Olszynka Grochowska 25 February 1831
Dębe Wielkie 31 March 1831
Mińsk Mazowiecki 26 April 1831
Ostrołęka 26 June 1831
Szymanów 15 August 1831
Krynka 28 August 1831
Rogoźnica 29 August 1831
Opole 15 September 1831

January Uprising 1863–1864
National Gendarmerie
National Guard

The second tablet reads:

Polish inscription

Walka o niepodległość Polski
i granice 1918–1920
Obrona Lwowa 1 XI 1918 – 22 XI 1918
Powstanie wielkopolskie 27 XII 1918 – 16 II 1919
Ossów–Radzymin 13–15 VIII 1920

Translation:
English translation

The fight for the independence of Poland
and its borders 1918–1920
Defence of Lviv 1 November 1918 – 22 November 1918
Greater Poland Uprising 27 December 1918 – 16 II 1919
Ossów–Radzymin 13–15 August 1920

The third tablet reads:

Polish inscription

II wojna światowa
Kampania wrześniowa 1 IX – 8 X 1939
Obrona Warszawy 8–23 IX 1939
Powstanie warszawskie 1 VIII – 5 X 1944

Polskie Siły Zbrojne na Zachodzie
Tobruk 19 VIII – 12 XII 1941
Monte Cassino 11–18 V 1944
Piedmonte 20–25 V 1944
Bolonia 9–21 IV 1945

Translation:
English translation

Second World War
September Campaign 1 September – 8 October 1939
Defence of Warsaw 8–23 September 1939
Warsaw Uprising 1 August – 5 October 1944

Polish Armed Forces in the West
Tobruk 19 August 1941
Monte Cassino 11–18 May 1944
Piedimont 20–25 May 1944
Bologna 9–21 IV 1945

The fourth tablet reads:

Polish inscription

Misje poza granicami kraju
UNDOF Syria
ISAF Afganistan

Translation:
English translation

Missions outside the borders of the country
United Nations Disengagement Observer Force, Syria
International Security Assistance Force, Afghanistan
