= Ochocki family with Ostoja coat of arms =

Polish medieval CoA Ostoja

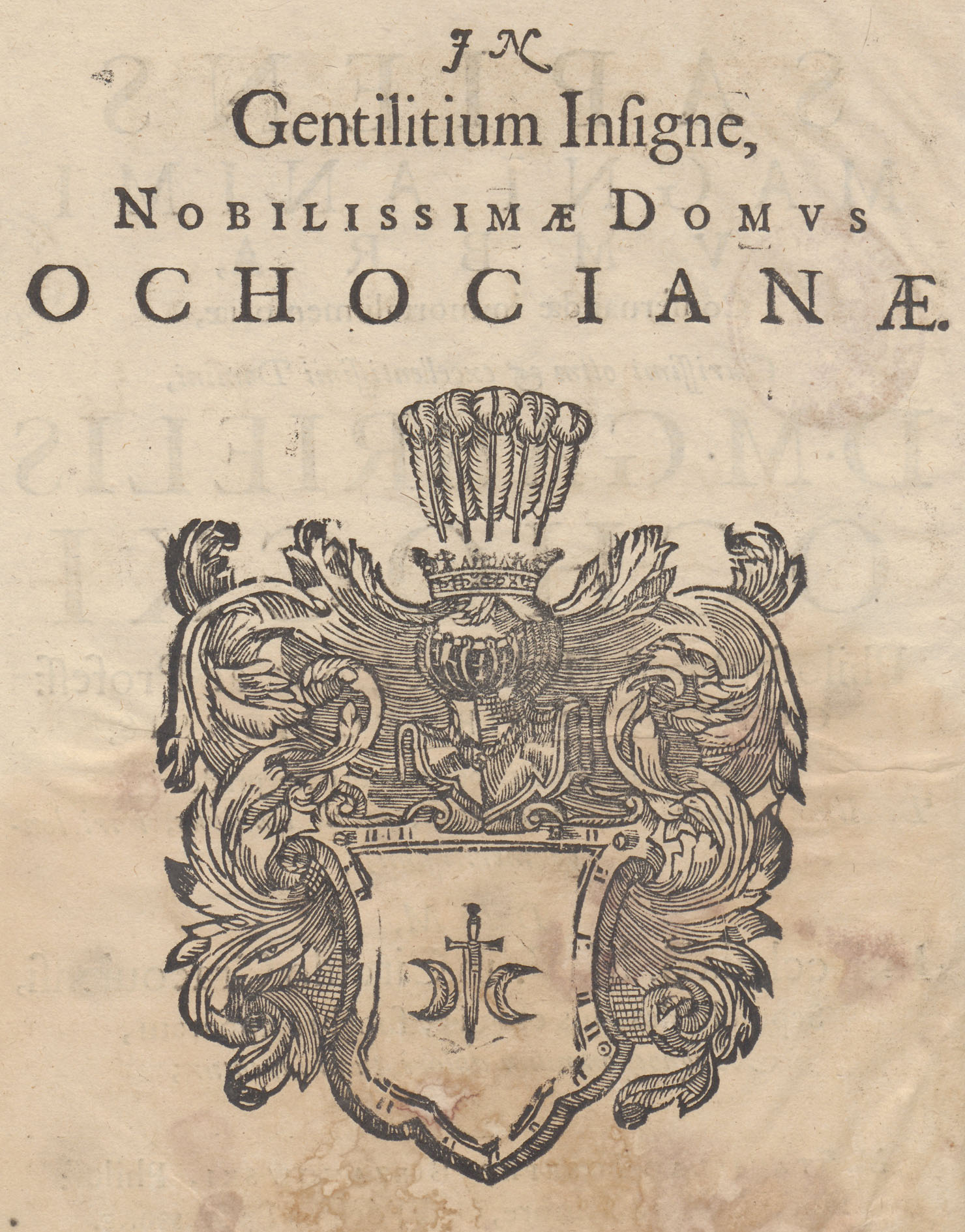
The coat of arms of Ostoja Ochockich published in 1673 in the work "Sapiens magni animi umbra" by Bieżanowski

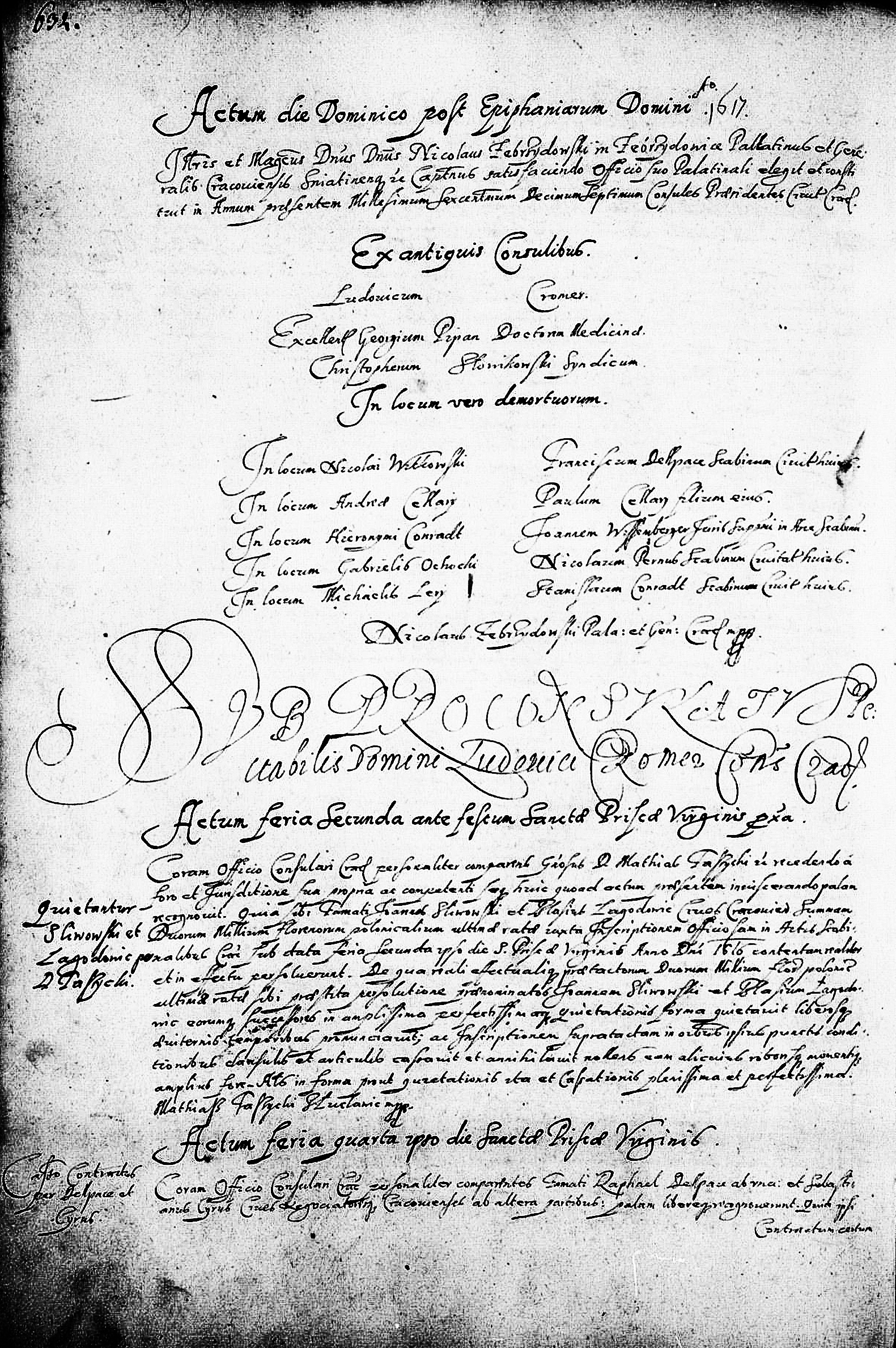
Page 632 from the Krakow Soviet Book covering the years 1612–1621 with a list of councilors, including Gabriel Ochocki

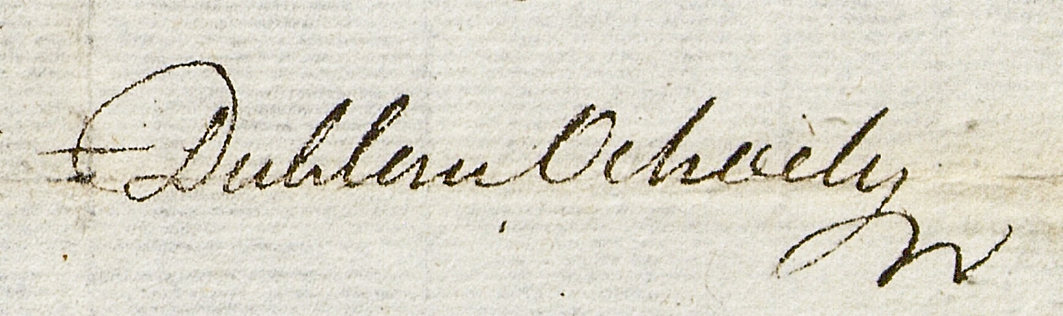
Autograph of the diarist Jan Duklan Ochocki from 1819.

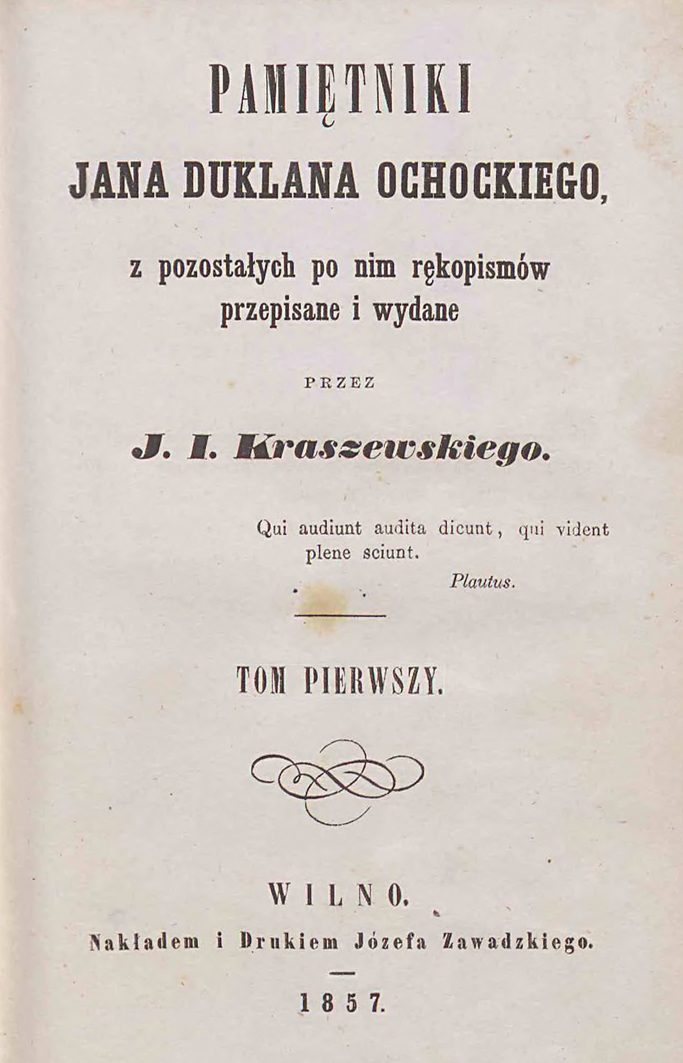
Title page of the first volume of Jan Duklan Ochocki's Memoirs, published in 1857 by Józef Ignacy Kraszewski.

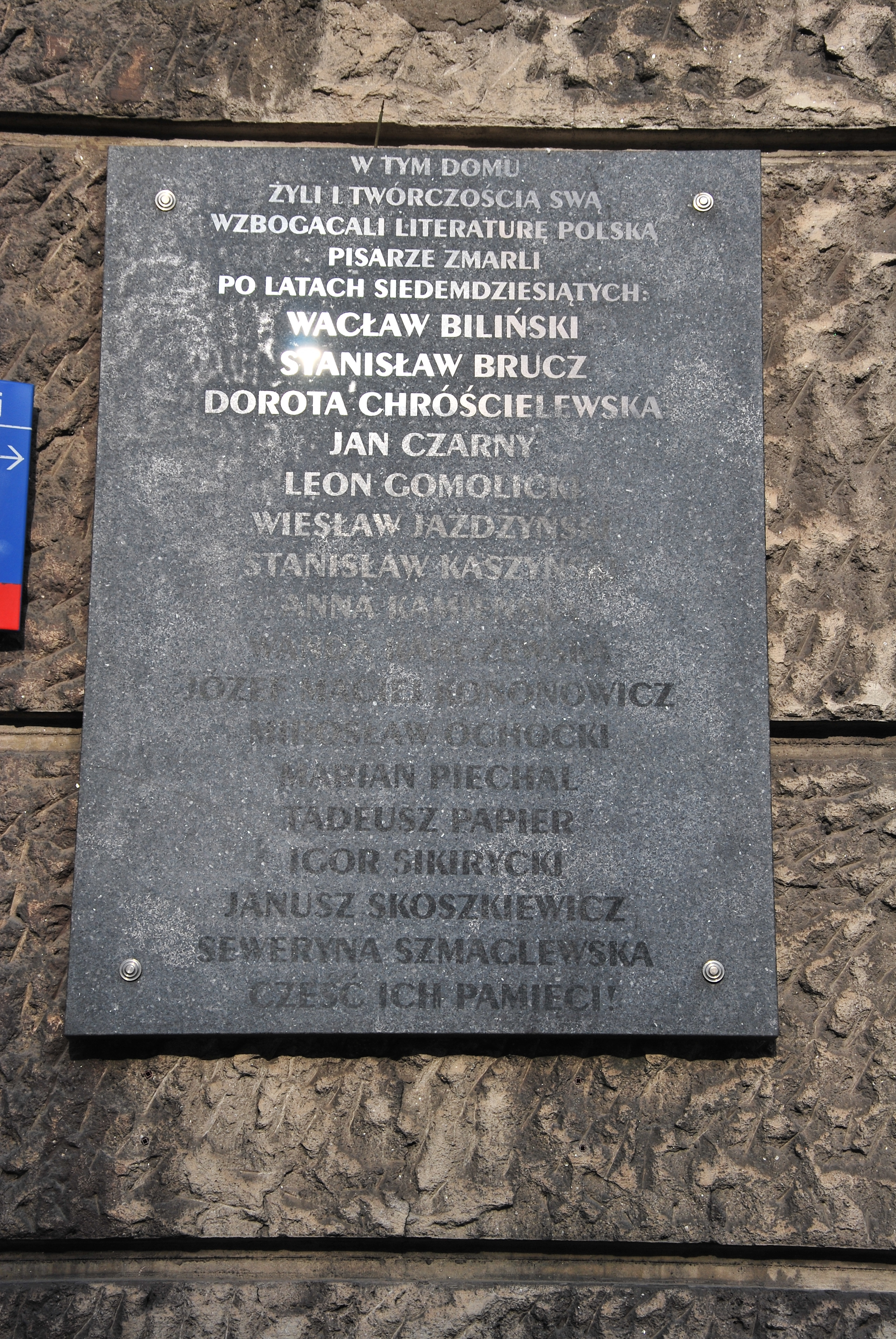
Plaque commemorating Mirosław Ochocki and other writers from Łódź (House of Writers in Łódź, photo from 2011).

The Ochocki family – Polish noble family with the Ostoja coat of arms, belonging to the heraldic Clan Ostoja (Moscics), originating from Ochocice near Kamieńsk in the former Sieradz Province. The Ochocki family was mentioned by Kasper Niesiecki in Herbarz Polski.

== The oldest source certificates concerning the family ==
Listed below are selected source certificates concerning the Ochockis of the Ostoja coat of arms and Ochocice, their nest village.

- The oldest mention of Ochocice dates back to 1386, from the Sieradz land book, Inscriptiones, covering the years 1386–1402.
- In 1400 Mikołaj of Ochocice appears in the sources.
- In 1405, Dominik from Ochocice and Jakub, also from Ochocice, sued for inflicted wounds. Probably the same Dominik of Ochocice tried in 1406 with Paweł of Jacków.
- Ochocice is mentioned in the "Liber beneficiorum of the Archdiocese of Gniezno", a work written in two parts on the order of Jan Łaski, the archbishop of Gniezno, in the years 1511–1523. According to this description, the tithing of the field and farmland in Ochocice was transferred to the church in Kamieńsk, and the peasants of Ochocice also paid 2 groszy of the hemp tithing.
- The Krakow Soviet book covering the years 1612–1621 contains a list of councilors elected for 1617, including the juror Mikołaj Pernus, elected to replace the deceased councilor Gabriel Ochocki.
- In the Krakow city accounting book covering the year 1648 there is a list of payments for members of the council in office for the mayor, with Gabriel Ochocki among the remunerated.

== Land estates and municipal properties belonging to the family ==
Listed below are the most important estates and municipal properties belonging to the Ochocki family of the Ostoja coat of arms.

More important land estates: Ochocice, miasto Żabno, Konary (now part of the town of Żabno), Zelanka (Żelazówka), Nieczajna, Odporyszów, Sieradza, grange Piaski, Strzelce, Sidaczówka, Ryżki (Ryszki).

Important municipal properties: a tenement house at Rynek 12A in Krakow (known as the Kamienicą Fontanowską), a tenement house at ul. Floriańska 7 in Krakow (known as the House of the Mother of God), the tenement house at ul. Floriańska 16 in Krakow (called the Ochockich Tenement House), the tenement house at ul. st. Jana 12 in Krakow (called Kamienica Krauzowska).

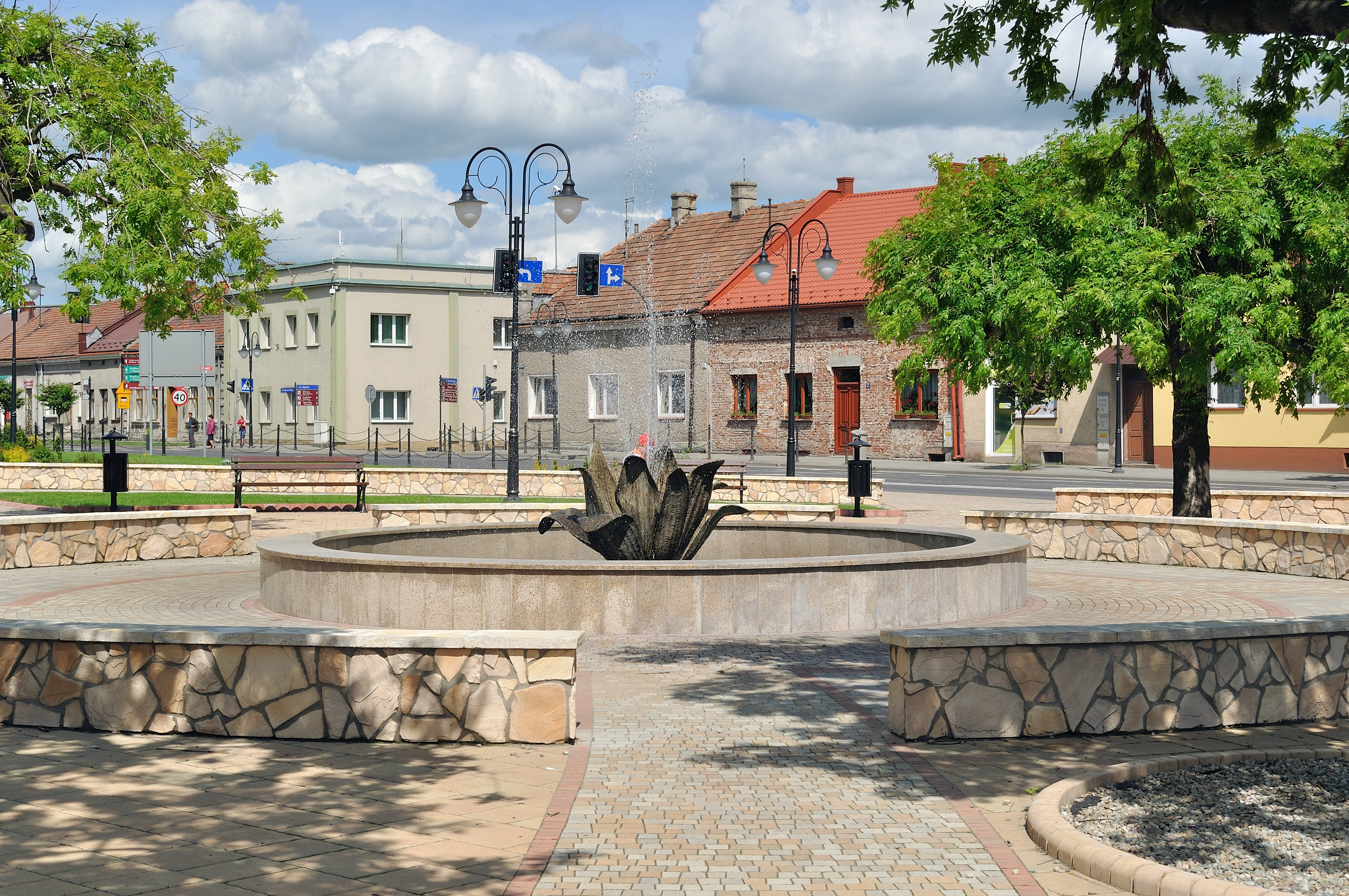
Żabno town center, present-day view.

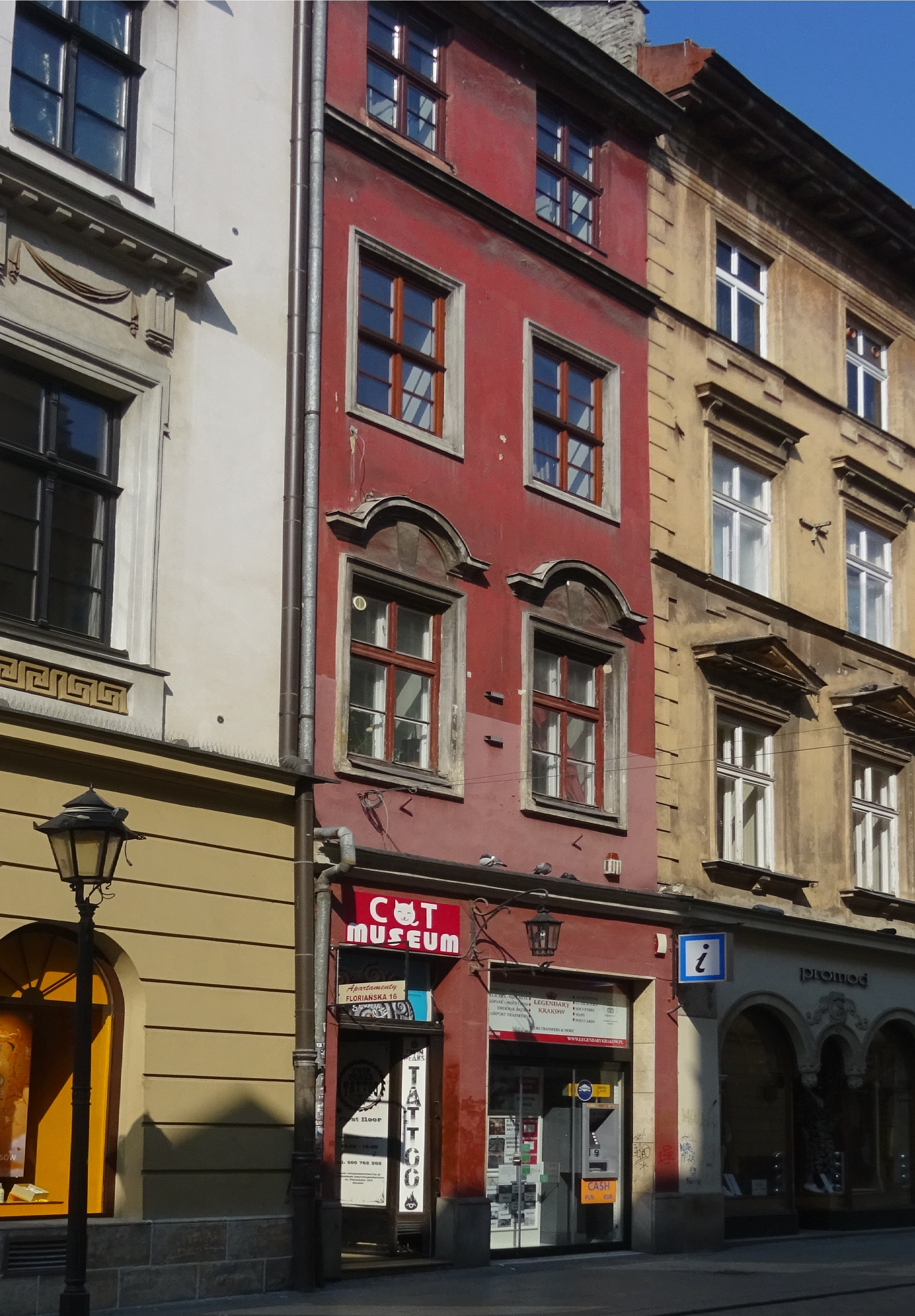
The Ochocki House in Krakow.

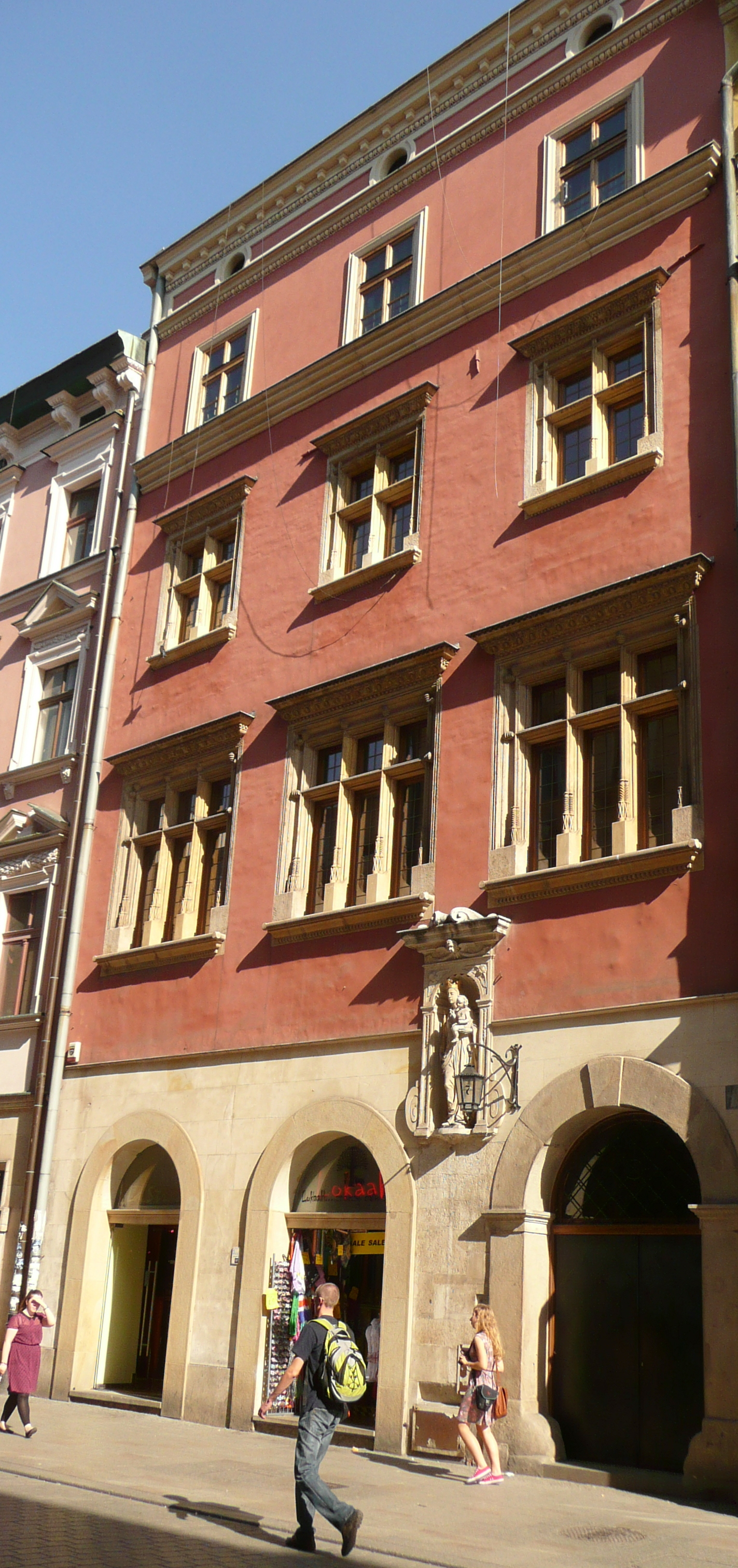
Tenement House Under the Mother of God in Krakow.

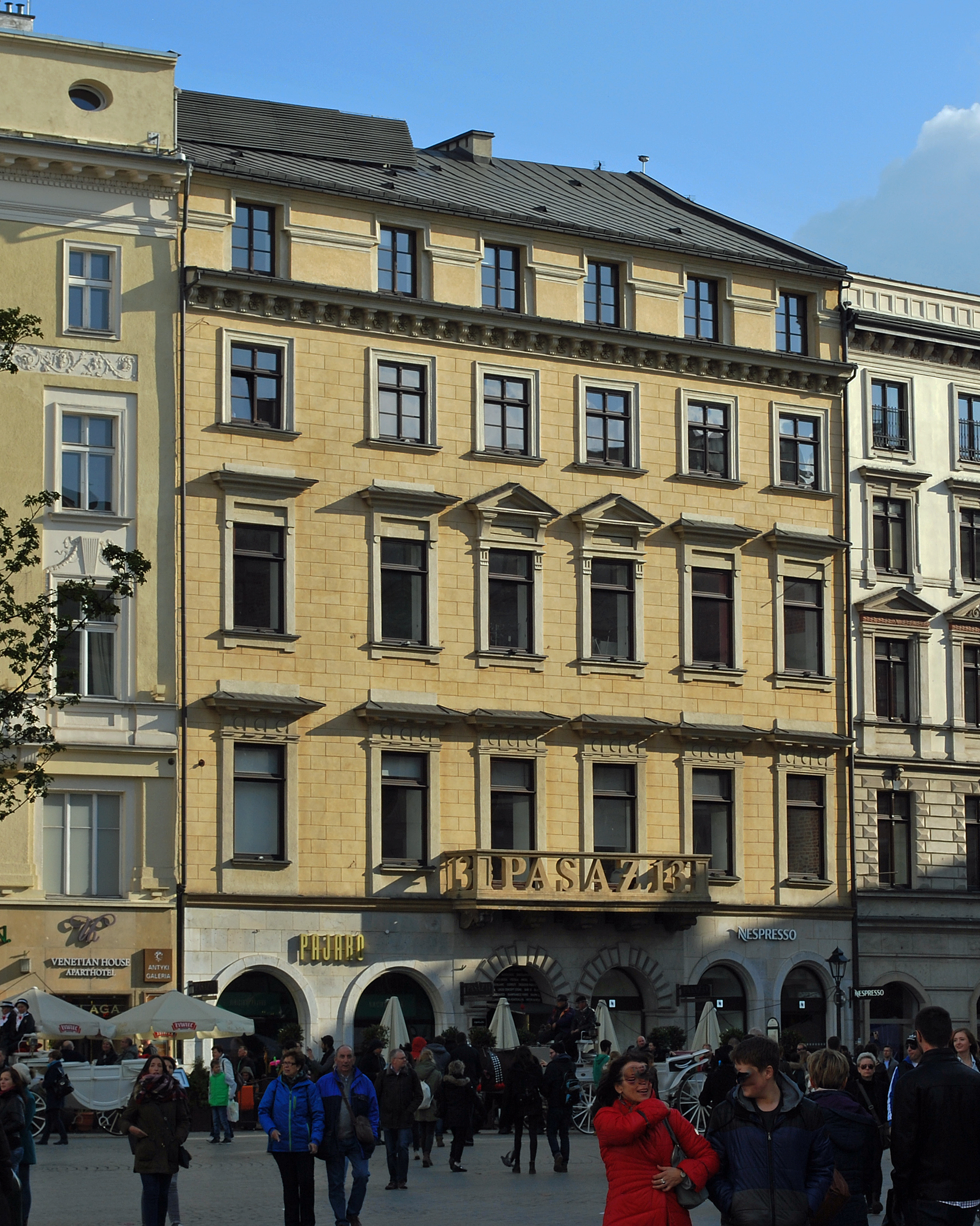
The Fontanowska tenement house in Krakow.

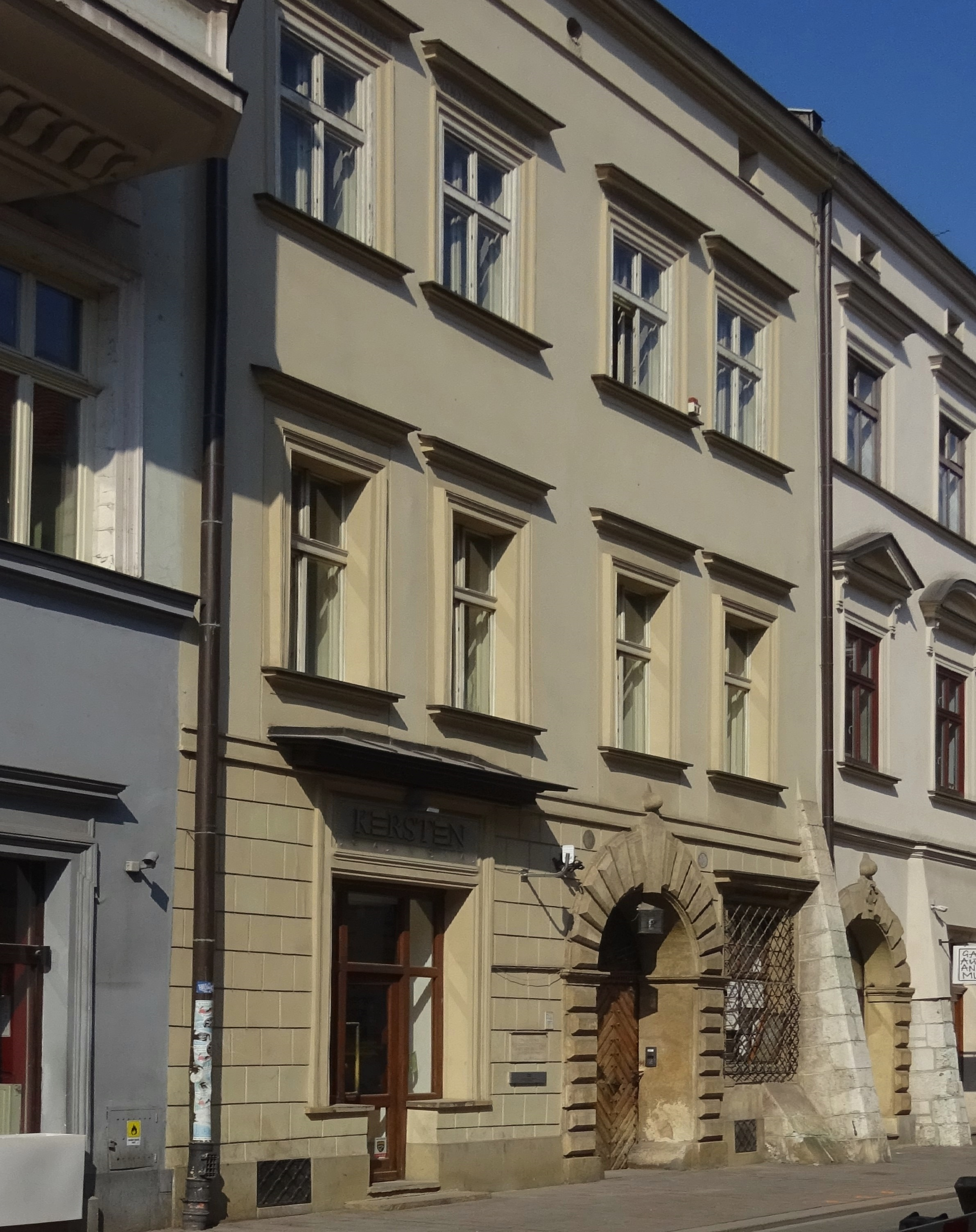
The Krauzowska tenement house in Krakow.

== Family representatives ==
- Gabriel Ochocki (died 1616) - a juror, councilor and mayor of the city of Krakow. He was the owner of a tenement house at the Market Square (No. 12A). He married Elizabeth, daughter of Jan Fontani.
- Sebastian Ochocki (died after 1640) - a Kraków juror, remained in the middle class and dealt with trade. He was the son of the councilor and mayor of Kraków, Gabriel Ochocki.
- Barbara Aleksandra Ochocka (died after 1640) - daughter of Gabriel Ochocki, councilor and mayor of Krakow. She was the wife of Maciej Wojeński, councilor, doctor of medicine and rector of the Krakow Academy.
- Gabriel Ochocki (1601-1673) - professor and rector of the Krakow Academy, councilor and mayor of Krakow, owner of the Żabno estate with the town of Żabno. He was the son of Gabriel, a juror, councilor and mayor of Kraków, and Elżbieta née Fontani. He married Barbara Brykner, daughter of Stanisław.
- Jan Ochocki (died after 1675) - a member of the Order of Brothers Preachers. He entered the Dominican monastery in Kraków on September 13, 1661. He studied at the Krakow Academy. In the years 1674–1675 he studied in Spain, then at the Sopra Minerva College in Rome. He was the son of Gabriel Ochocki, rector of the Krakow Academy, councilor and mayor of Krakow.
- Hieronim Ochocki (died 1676) - doctor of both laws, custodian of Pilica, canon and official of Wiślica, canon of the All Saints collegiate church in Krakow, apostolic protonotary, assessor in the Krakow curia, parish priest in Strożyska, Sędziszów and Słupia. He was the son of the councilor and mayor of Kraków, Gabriel Ochocki.
- Piotr Ochocki (died after 1681) - a city juror in Kraków, a carpenter in Grabowiec. He was the son of Gabriel, a juror, councilor and mayor of Krakow.
- Gabriel Ochocki (died 1682) - doctor, professor of medicine at the Krakow Academy, councilor and mayor of Krakow, owner of the Strzelce estate near Brzesko. He married Anna, the daughter of Stanisław Spinek, a doctor of laws and a councilor from Kraków.
- Gabriel Ochocki (died after 1699) - a bachelor and master of philosophy at the Krakow Academy, in the years 1696–1698 he lectured at the Artium Faculty, then became a Marian altarist before 1699. He was the son of Gabriel and Anna née Spinków.
- Kazimierz Jan Ochocki (died after 1704) - a Kraków burgher. He was the son of Gabriel Ochocki, rector of the Krakow Academy, councilor and mayor of Krakow. His spouse was Katarzyna née Karmichel, who had a mortgage from Katarzyna Lubomirska née Sapieha and her sons in the villages of Gorzyce, Wielopole, Borek, Pilica, Jadomierz, Dąbrówka and Bucze.
- Mikołaj Ochocki (died after 1704) - bachelor and master of the Krakow Academy, associate professor at the Faculty of Philosophy, rector (senior) of the school of St. Anna in Krakow. In 1704, with gifts from the Krakow City Council, as a seminarian, he received the Corpus Christi altar in St. Mary's Church. He was the son of Gabriel and Anna née Spinków.
- Jan Ochocki (died after 1705) - bachelor and master of the Krakow Academy, doctor of law, associate professor at the Faculty of Philosophy, rector (senior) of the Wawel castle school. He was the son of a medical doctor, councilor and mayor of Krakow, Gabriel Ochocki and Anna née Spinków.
- Franciszek Ochocki (died after 1786) - a Smolensk hunter, representative of the starost of Piotr Małachowski, tenant of the village of Pleszów.
- Stanisław Józef Ochocki (died 1793), a cup of Mozyr, deputy to the Lublin tribunal from the Łuków region, marshal of the court of the Lithuanian field hetman Józef Sosnowski. He was the heir of the Sidaczówek estate near Cudnów, as well as the village of Ryszki (Ryżki) in the Łuków region. He had a brother, Józefat Ochocki, the Abbot of Basilians in Owrucz. His son, born of his wife Eufrozyna Suszczewicz, was the famous diarist Jan Duklan Ochocki.
- Józefat Ochocki (died 1806) - Abbot of the Basilians in Owrucz, doctor of theology, rector of Basilian schools, diarist.
- Jan Duklan Ochocki (1766 / 8–1848) - diarist, chamberlain of King Stanisław August Poniatowski, ensign, lieutenant and judge of Żytomierz, palestrant of Żytomierz, courtier of Józef Stempkowski, voivode of Kiev. He was the son of Stanisław Józef Ochocki, a teacup from Mozyr and Eufrozyna née Suszczewicz.
- Mirosław Ochocki (1927-1988) - writer, poet, literary critic, researcher at the University of Łódź and the State Higher School of Fine Arts in Łódź. He was a member of the editorial staff of the Lodz magazines "Kronika" and "Osnowa", he also worked for the Lodz television. He lived in Łódź, in a tenement house at ul. Kościuszki 98 (House of Writers in Łódź) with a plaque commemorating famous writers (including himself) associated with this place.

== See also ==
- Ostoja CoA
- Clan of Ostoja

== Bibliography ==
- K. Niesiecki, Herbarz polski, wyd. J.N. Bobrowicz, Lipsk 1839–1845, t. VII.
- S. Uruski, Rodzina. Herbarz szlachty polskiej, Warszawa 1904–1931, t. XII.
- B. Kasprzyk (red.), Poczet sołtysów, wójtów, burmistrzów i prezydentów miasta Krakowa (1228–2010), Kraków 2010.
- Polski Słownik Biograficzny, t. XXIII, Wrocław-Warszawa-Kraków-Gdańsk 1978.
