= Gołaszyn =

Gołaszyn may refer to the following places:

- Gołaszyn, Oborniki County in Greater Poland Voivodeship (west-central Poland)
- Gołaszyn, Rawicz County in Greater Poland Voivodeship (west-central Poland)
- Gołaszyn, Lublin Voivodeship (east Poland)
- Gołaszyn, Lubusz Voivodeship (west Poland)
