= Battle of Międzyrzec Podlaski =

Battle of the November Uprising

- Part of the November Uprising
Date	29 August 1831
Location	around Manie, Rogoźnica, and Międzyrzec Podlaski in Congress Poland (now part of Poland)
Result	Polish victory

Belligerents
Polish National Government	Russian Empire

Commanders and leaders
Girolamo Ramorino	Georg Andreas von Rosen

Strength
20,000 soldiers	15,000 soldiers

The Battle of Międzyrzec Podlaski, also known as the Battle of Rogoźnica, took place during the November Uprising, on 29 August 1831, in the area of the villages of Manie, Rogoźnica, and Międzyrzec Podlaski, in Congress Poland. It was fought by the insurgent forces of the Polish National Government, led by Girolamo Ramorino, against the forces of the Russian Empire, led by Georg Andreas von Rosen. It was won by the insurgent forces.
