= Strzyżew =

Strzyżew may refer to the following places:

- Strzyżew, Gmina Sieroszewice, Ostrów County in Greater Poland Voivodeship (west-central Poland)
- Strzyżew, Lublin Voivodeship (east Poland)
- Strzyżew, Masovian Voivodeship (east-central Poland)
- Strzyżew, Pleszew County in Greater Poland Voivodeship (west-central Poland)
