= Kownatki =

Kownatki may refer to the following places in Poland:

- Kownatki, Lublin Voivodeship
- Kownatki, Podlaskie Voivodeship
- Kownatki-Falęcino
