= Wagram (disambiguation) =

Deutsch-Wagram is a city in Austria.

Wagram may also refer to:

== Places ==
- Wagram, North Carolina, United States
- Wagram, Ohio, United States
- Wagram, Poland

== Other ==
- Wagram station, a Paris Metro station
- Battle of Wagram (1809), a battle in the War of the Fifth Coalition, part of the Napoleonic Wars
- French ship Wagram (1810), a French navy 118-gun Océan-class ship of the line
- French ship Wagram (1854), a French navy 100-gun Hercule-class ship of the line
- Princes of Wagram, a title of Napoleonic nobility
- Wagram Music, a French record label
