= Manie (disambiguation) =

Manie is a village in Biała County, Lublin Voivodeship, Poland.

Manie may also refer to:

- Christine Manie (born 1984), Cameroonian footballer
- Salie Manie (born 1949), South African politician
