= Gołąbki, Lublin Voivodeship =

Gołąbki
- Village
- Location within Poland
- Coordinates: 51°52′32″N 22°25′4″E
- Country: Poland
- Voivodeship: Lublin
- County: Łuków
- Gmina: Łuków

Gołąbki [ɡɔˈwɔmpki] is a village in the administrative district of Gmina Łuków, within Łuków County, Lublin Voivodeship, in eastern Poland.
