= Dąbie, Łuków County =

Dąbie
- Village
- Location within Poland
- Coordinates: 51°55′41″N 22°15′49″E
- Country: Poland
- Voivodeship: Lublin
- County: Łuków
- Gmina: Łuków
- Population: 900

Dąbie [ˈdɔmbjɛ] is a village in the administrative district of Gmina Łuków, within Łuków County, Lublin Voivodeship, in eastern Poland.
