= Zalesie, Łuków County =

Zalesie
- Village
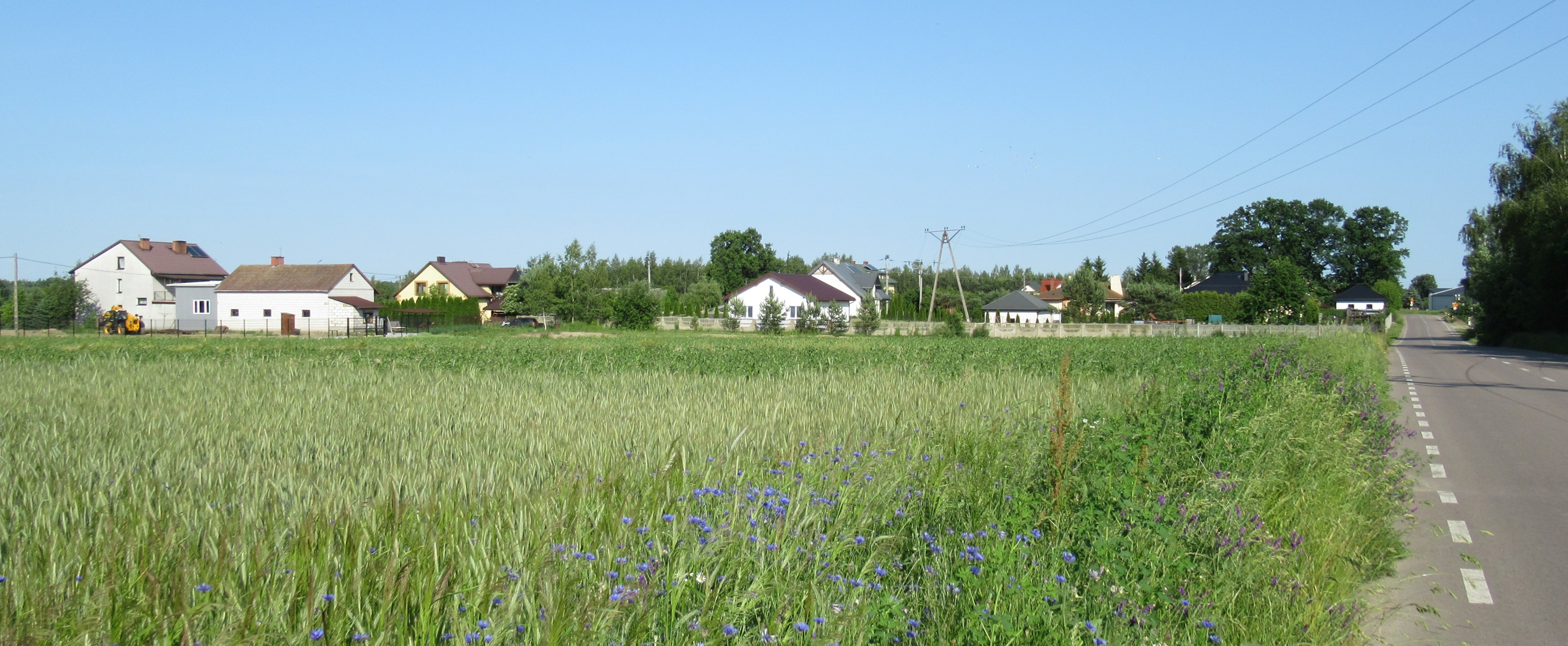

- Location within Poland
- Coordinates: 51°56′12″N 22°18′34″E
- Country: Poland
- Voivodeship: Lublin
- County: Łuków
- Gmina: Łuków
- Population: 952

Zalesie [zaˈlɛɕɛ] is a village in the administrative district of Gmina Łuków, within Łuków County, Lublin Voivodeship, in eastern Poland.
