= Świdry, Łuków County =

Świdry
- Village
- Location within Poland
- Coordinates: 51°53′18″N 22°21′13″E
- Country: Poland
- Voivodeship: Lublin
- County: Łuków
- Gmina: Łuków

Świdry (Polish pronunciation: [ˈɕfidrɨ]) is a village in the administrative district of Gmina Łuków, within Łuków County, Lublin Voivodeship, in eastern Poland.
