= Gręzówka =

- Village
- Location within Poland
- Coordinates: 52°0′13″N 22°17′9″E
- Country: Poland
- Voivodeship: Lublin
- County: Łuków
- Gmina: Łuków

Gręzówka ([ɡrɛ̃ˈzufka]) is a village in the administrative district of Gmina Łuków within Łuków County, Lublin Voivodeship in eastern Poland.
