= Szyba =

- Village
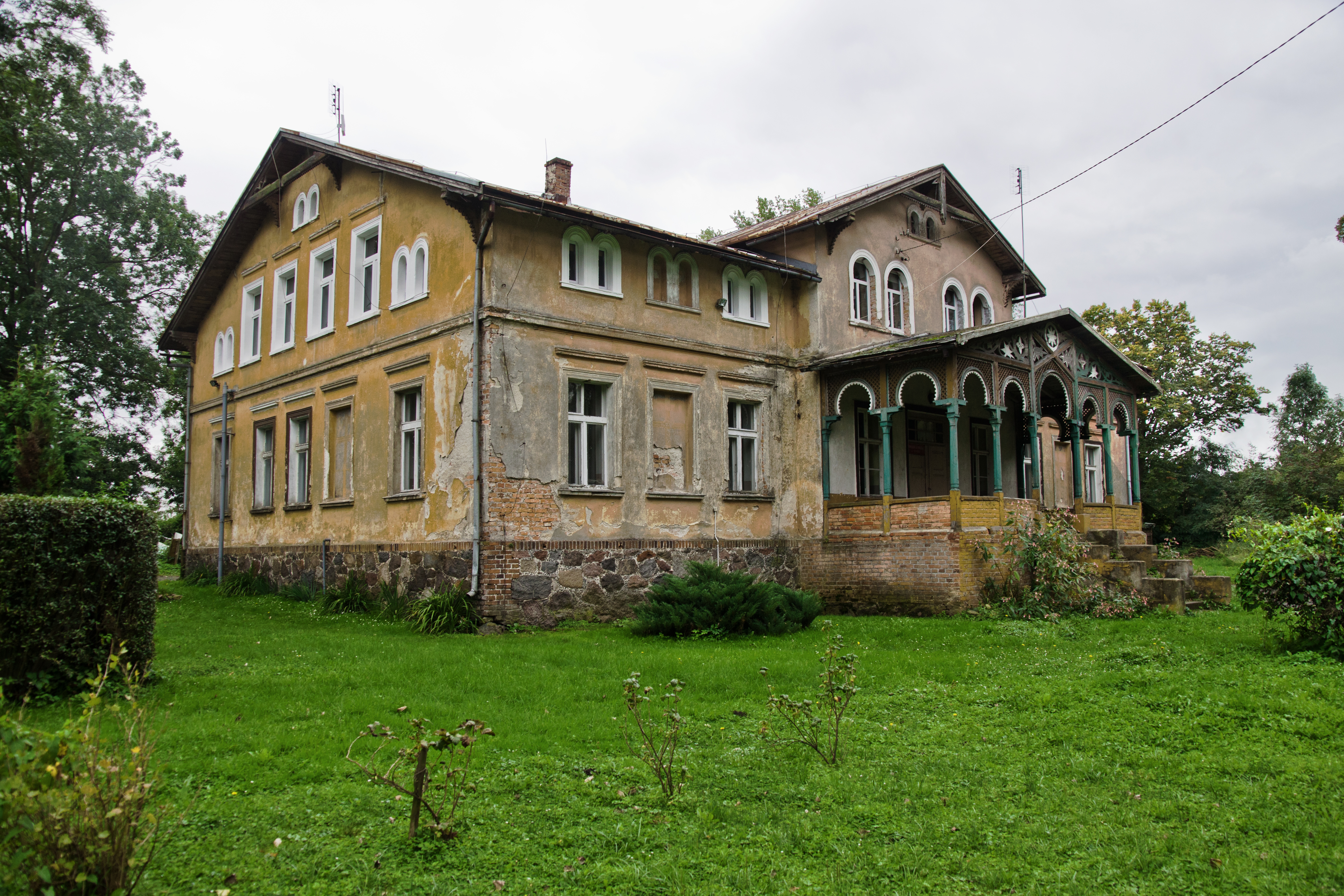

- Location within Poland
- Coordinates: 51°40′N 15°41′E
- Country: Poland
- Voivodeship: Lubusz
- County: Nowa Sól
- Gmina: Nowe Miasteczko
- Population: 49

Szyba [ˈʂɨba] is a village in the administrative district of Gmina Nowe Miasteczko, within Nowa Sól County, Lubusz Voivodeship, in western Poland.
