= Gręzówka-Kolonia =

- Village
- Location within Poland
- Coordinates: 51°59′28″N 22°18′46″E
- Country: Poland
- Voivodeship: Lublin
- County: Łuków
- Gmina: Łuków
- Population: 373

Gręzówka-Kolonia [ɡrɛ̃ˈzufka kɔˈlɔɲa] is a village in the administrative district of Gmina Łuków, within Łuków County, Lublin Voivodeship, in eastern Poland.
