= Ławki, Łuków County =

Ławki
- Village
- Location within Poland
- Coordinates: 51°57′49″N 22°20′6″E
- Country: Poland
- Voivodeship: Lublin
- County: Łuków
- Gmina: Łuków

Ławki [ˈwafki] is a village in the administrative district of Gmina Łuków, within Łuków County, Lublin Voivodeship, in eastern Poland.
