= Suchocin, Lublin Voivodeship =

Suchocin
- Village
- Location within Poland
- Coordinates: 51°53′17″N 22°30′10″E
- Country: Poland
- Voivodeship: Lublin
- County: Łuków
- Gmina: Łuków

Suchocin [suˈxɔt͡ɕin] is a village in the administrative district of Gmina Łuków, within Łuków County, Lublin Voivodeship, in eastern Poland.
