= Borów Wielki =

- Village
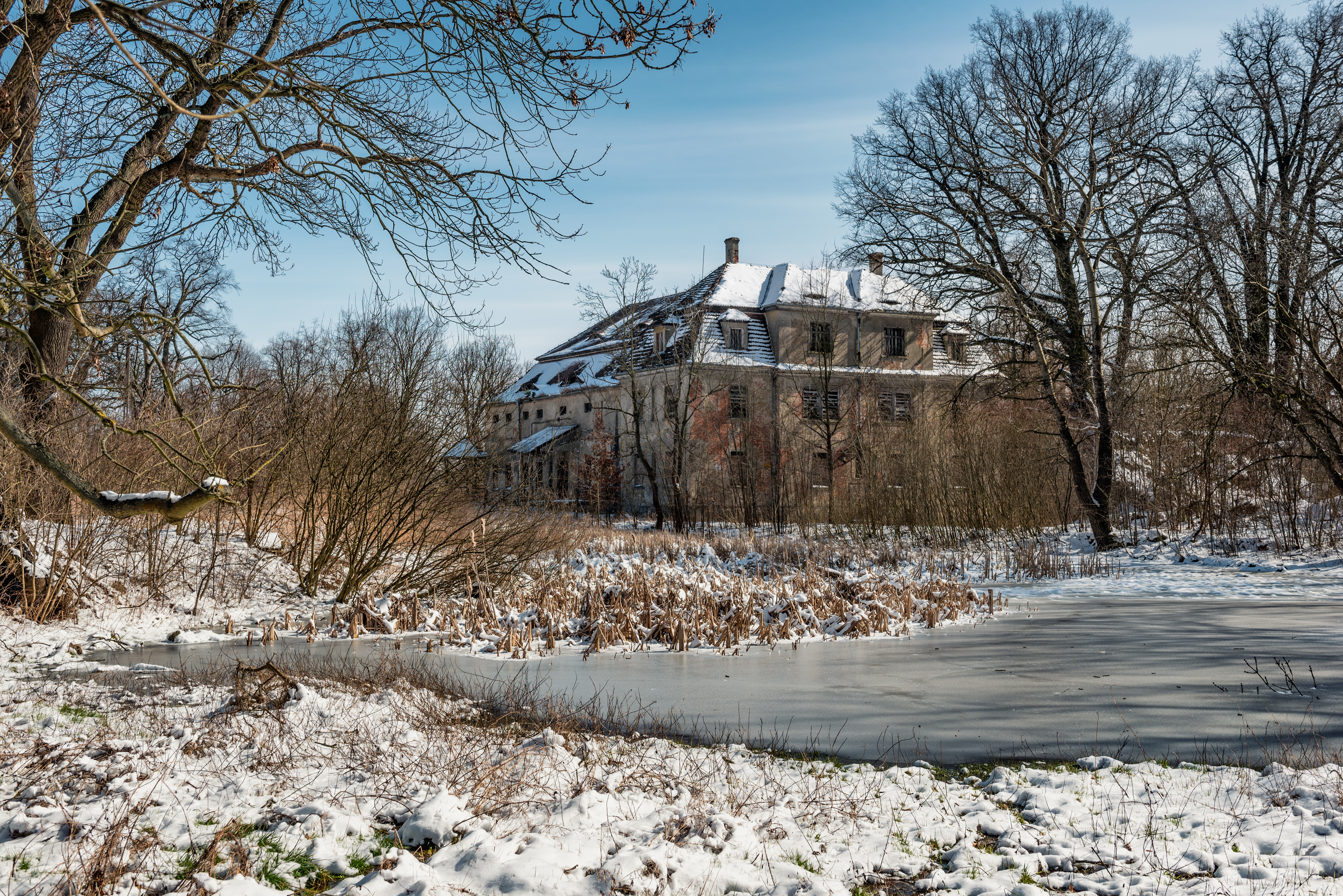

- Location within Poland
- Coordinates: 51°40′54″N 15°37′28″E
- Country: Poland
- Voivodeship: Lubusz
- County: Nowa Sól
- Gmina: Nowe Miasteczko

Borów Wielki (Polish pronunciation: [ˈbɔruv ˈvjɛlkʲi]) is a village in the administrative district of Gmina Nowe Miasteczko, within Nowa Sól County, Lubusz Voivodeship, in western Poland.
