= Rzymy-Rzymki =

- Village
- Location within Poland
- Coordinates: 51°52′0″N 22°28′30″E
- Country: Poland
- Voivodeship: Lublin
- County: Łuków
- Gmina: Łuków

Rzymy-Rzymki [ˈʐɨmɨ ˈʐɨmki] is a village in the administrative district of Gmina Łuków, within Łuków County, Lublin Voivodeship, in eastern Poland.
