= Konin, Lubusz Voivodeship =

Konin
- Village
- Location within Poland
- Coordinates: 51°41′1″N 15°41′42″E
- Country: Poland
- Voivodeship: Lubusz
- County: Nowa Sól
- Gmina: Nowe Miasteczko
- Population: 3,390

Konin [ˈkɔnin] is a village in the administrative district of Gmina Nowe Miasteczko, within Nowa Sól County, Lubusz Voivodeship, in western Poland.
