= Aleksandrów, Gmina Łuków =

Aleksandrów
- Village
- Location within Poland
- Coordinates: 51°54′7″N 22°28′3″E
- Country: Poland
- Voivodeship: Lublin
- County: Łuków
- Gmina: Łuków
- Population: 440

Aleksandrów [alɛkˈsandruf] is a village in the administrative district of Gmina Łuków, within Łuków County, Lublin Voivodeship, in eastern Poland.
