= Jadwisin, Łuków County =

Jadwisin
- Village
- Location within Poland
- Coordinates: 51°51′N 22°23′E
- Country: Poland
- Voivodeship: Lublin
- County: Łuków
- Gmina: Łuków
- Elevation: 162 m (531 ft)
- Population: 138

Jadwisin [jadˈviɕin] is a village in the administrative district of Gmina Łuków, within Łuków County, Lublin Voivodeship, in eastern Poland.
