= Zarzecz Łukowski =

- Village
- Location within Poland
- Coordinates: 51°55′13″N 22°32′25″E
- Country: Poland
- Voivodeship: Lublin
- County: Łuków
- Gmina: Łuków

Zarzecz Łukowski [ˈzaʐɛt͡ʂ wuˈkɔfski] is a village in the administrative district of Gmina Łuków, within Łuków County, Lublin Voivodeship, in eastern Poland.
