= Popęszyce =

- Village
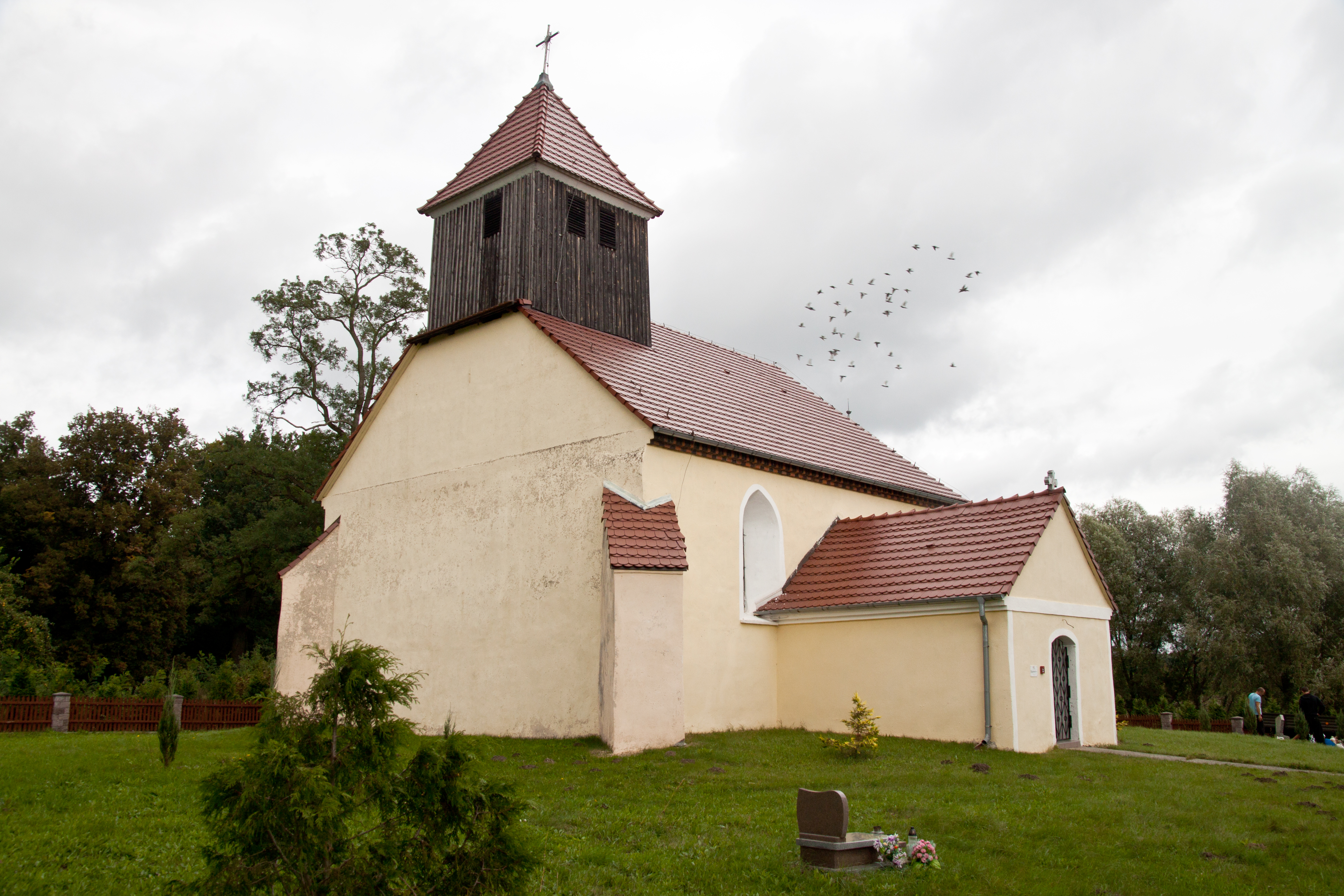
- Catholic church

- Location within Poland
- Coordinates: 51°39′46″N 15°43′11″E
- Country: Poland
- Voivodeship: Lubusz
- County: Nowa Sól
- Gmina: Nowe Miasteczko

Popęszyce [pɔpɛ̃ˈʂɨt͡sɛ] is a village in the administrative district of Gmina Nowe Miasteczko, within Nowa Sól County, Lubusz Voivodeship, in western Poland.
