= Rejów =

- Village
- Location within Poland
- Coordinates: 51°43′21″N 15°44′53″E
- Country: Poland
- Voivodeship: Lubusz
- County: Nowa Sól
- Gmina: Nowe Miasteczko
- Population (approx.): 200

Rejów [ˈrɛjuf] is a village in the administrative district of Gmina Nowe Miasteczko, within Nowa Sól County, Lubusz Voivodeship, in western Poland.
