= Günter Bialas =

German composer (1907-1995)

Günter Bialas (19 July 1907 – 8 July 1995) was a German composer.

== Life ==
Bialas was born in Bielschowitz (today Bielszowice, a subdivision of Ruda Śląska) in Prussian Silesia. His father was the business manager of a German theatre, and his musical aesthetic was influenced by the personal experiences and connections he made while spending time at that theatre in his youth. The adolescent Bialas received lessons in piano and music theory from Fritz Lubrich, a former student of Max Reger, in Kattowitz (Katowice) between 1922 and 1925. After graduating from the German Minority-Gymnasium in Kattowitz in 1926, he studied musicology, Germanistics, and history at the Friedrich-Wilhelms-Universität zu Breslau from 1927 to 1931. He then proceeded to study music at the Prussian Academy of Arts in Berlin and subsequently taught at the Ursulines Girls' School in Breslau-Karlowitz from 1934 to 1937. He pursued further studies in composition with Max Trapp in Berlin. Through some of his Romanian friends, he made the acquaintance of Sergiu Celibidache and prepared for the entrance examination to the Berlin University of the Arts.

In 1939, he became a lecturer in music theory and composition at the Institute for Music Education at Breslau University. After his German military service and Allied captivity from 1941 to 1945, he and his wife, the singer Gerda Specht, had to flee Silesia. They settled in Bavaria in 1946 and Bialas found work conducting the Munich Bach-Verein. From 1947 to 1959, he taught composition at the Nordwestdeutschen Musikakademie, now the Hochschule für Musik Detmold. He transferred to become a professor at the State Academy of Music in Munich in 1959, where he remained until his retirement in 1972.

For his compositions, Bialas was recognized with many prizes and honors, including the Großer Preis für Musik des Landes NRW (1954), the Münchner Musikpreis (1962), the Johann-Wenzel-Stamitz-Preis (1964), the Musikpreis der Bayerische Akademie der Schönen Künste (1967, elected to the Akademie in 1971), the Plöner Musikpreis (1988), and the Bayerischer Maximiliansorden für Wissenschaft und Kunst (1991).

After his death in 1995, a street in his adopted hometown of Glonn was named Bialas-Straße in his honor and marked with a sign bearing his biographical details.

Bialas is considered to have been one of the most influential composition instructors in postwar Germany. The legacy of his open, liberal, and undoctrinaire attitudes to teaching may be appreciated in the stylistic variety of those who were his students or mentorees, including Nicolaus A. Huber, Peter Michael Hamel, Wilfried Hiller, Heinz Winbeck, Ulrich Stranz, Michael Denhoff, Manfred Kluge, and Gerd Zacher.

== Selected works ==
Opera

- Hero und Leander (premiered 1966, Mannheim)
- Die Geschichte von Aucassin und Nicolette (premiered 1969, Munich)
- Der Gestiefelte Kater (premiered 1976, Schlosstheater Schwetzingen)
- Aus der Matratzengruft (premiered 1992, Kiel)

Ballet

- Meyerbeer-Paraphrasen (premiered 1974, Hamburg)

Oratorio

- Im Anfang (1961), interpretation of Genesis based on text by Martin Buber, for three echoic voices, choir, and orchestra
- Lamento di Orlando (1983–85) for baritone, mixed choir, and orchestra

Cantata

- Indianische Kantate (1949), based on the composer's original poems, for baritone, chamber choir, 8 instruments, and drums
- Preisungen (1964), based on text by Martin Buber, for baritone and orchestra

Orchestra

- Romanzero (1955)
- Seranata (1955)
- Sinfonia Piccola (1960)
- Waldmusik (1977)
- Der Weg nach Eisenstadt (1980), fantasies on Haydn
- Marsch-Fantasie (1987)
- Ländler-Fantasie (1989)

Concertante

- Concerto Lirico (1967) for piano and orchestra
- Introitus - Exodus (1976) for organ and orchestra
- Music for Piano and Orchestra (1990)
- Cello Concerto No. 2 (1992)
- Trauermusik (Funeral Music) for viola and orchestra (1994)

Chamber music

- Music for Eleven Strings (1970)
- 5 String Quartets (1935, 1949, 1968, 1986, 1991)
- Harp Quintet (1983)
- 2 Saxophone Quartets (Six Bagatelles, 1986; Kunst des Kanons, 1991)
- Piano Trio (1981)
- Herbstzeit (1982) for string trio and piano
- Nine Bagatelles (1984) for wind trio, string trio, and piano
- Fünf Duette (5 Duets) for viola and cello (1988)

Piano

- Lamento, vier Intermezzi und Marsch (1986)
