= Miłaków, Lubusz Voivodeship =

Miłaków
- Village
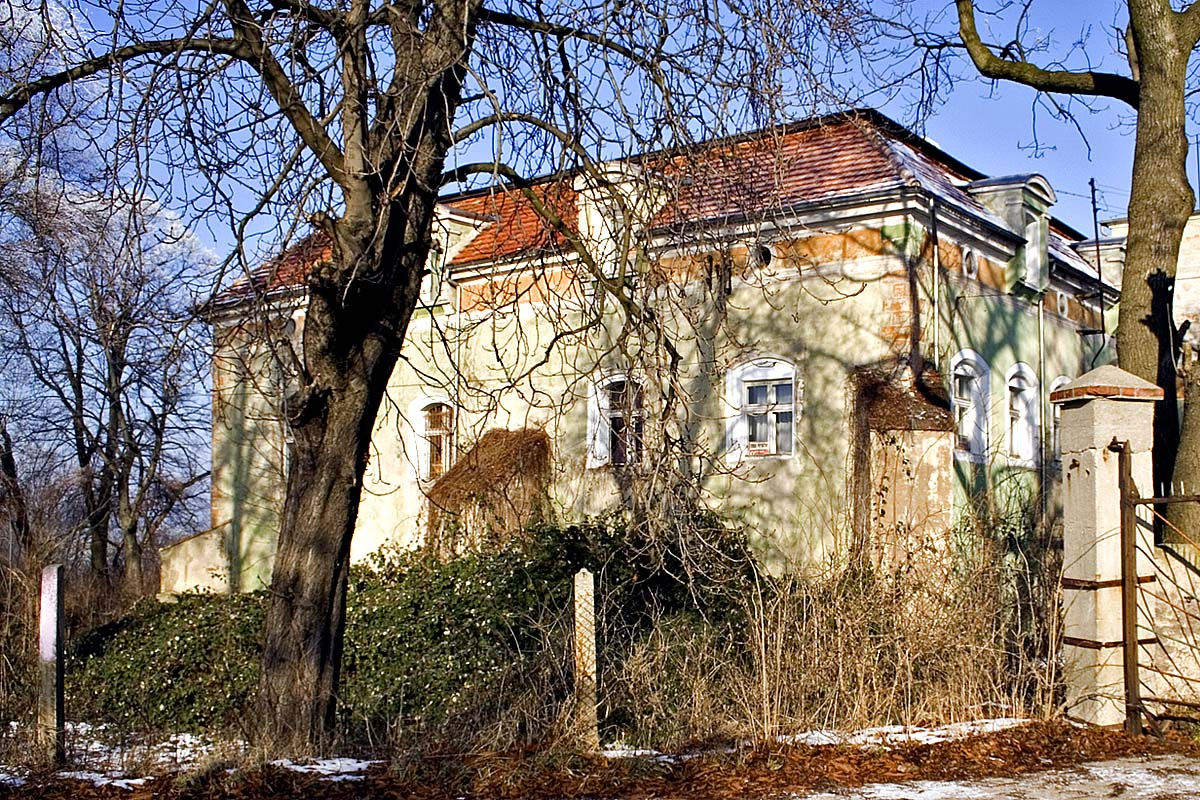
- Manor

- Location within Poland
- Coordinates: 51°40′47″N 15°47′10″E
- Country: Poland
- Voivodeship: Lubusz
- County: Nowa Sól
- Gmina: Nowe Miasteczko
- Population: 350

Miłaków [miˈwakuf] is a village in the administrative district of Gmina Nowe Miasteczko, within Nowa Sól County, Lubusz Voivodeship, in western Poland.
