= Fritz Lubrich =

German organist and composer

Fritz Lubrich (26 January 1888 – 15 April 1971) was a German organist and composer.

Lubrich was born in Neustädtel. His father (1862-1952) was a cantor and hymnologist. Lubrich jr. attended the teacher's seminar in Żagań from 1905 to 1908 and was appointed in 1907 at the University of Music and Theatre Leipzig, a student of Reger and Straube. At the end of his studies he received the Arthur Nikisch Prize for composition.

From 1911 to 1919 Lubrich was a music teacher at the Protestant Teachers' Seminar in Bielsko-Biała, and in 1917 he received the Austrian title of professor. In 1919 Lubrich became chief organist at the Pauluskirche in Breslau. In 1923 he also received the German and Polish professorial titles. In the 1920s, Lubrich became organist at the Church of the Resurrection, Katowice. After the Second World War he went to Hamburg and continued his work as an organist and pedagogue.

Among Lubricht students were Engelbert Hilbich, Günter Bialas, Gerd Zacher and Kurt Schwaen.

Lubricht died in Hamburg at age 83.

== Work ==
- Kyrie eleison (Charakterstück in D), Op. 9 (1909)
- Drei Stücke, Op. 13 (1911)
- Drei Stimmungsbilder Op. 24 (1912)
- Fünf Choral-Improvisationen, (1912)
- Drei romantische Tonstücke (after three pictures by Arnold Böcklin), Op. 37 (1913), dedicated to Charles-Marie Widor
- Totenklage, Op. 46 (1914)
- Sphärenmusik in der Weihenacht, Op. 50 (1914).
