= Suleje =

- Village
- Location within Poland
- Coordinates: 51°58′N 22°26′E
- Country: Poland
- Voivodeship: Lublin
- County: Łuków
- Gmina: Łuków
- Time zone: UTC+1 (CET)
  - Summer (DST): UTC+2 (CEST)

Suleje [suˈlɛjɛ] is a village in the administrative district of Gmina Łuków, within Łuków County, Lublin Voivodeship, in eastern Poland.

== History ==
Three Polish citizens were murdered by Nazi Germany in the village during World War II.
