= Żuków, Lubusz Voivodeship =

Żuków
- Village
- Location within Poland
- Coordinates: 51°40′2″N 15°45′3″E
- Country: Poland
- Voivodeship: Lubusz
- County: Nowa Sól
- Gmina: Nowe Miasteczko

Żuków [ˈʐukuf] is a village in the administrative district of Gmina Nowe Miasteczko, within Nowa Sól County, Lubusz Voivodeship, in western Poland.
