= Nowe Miasteczko =

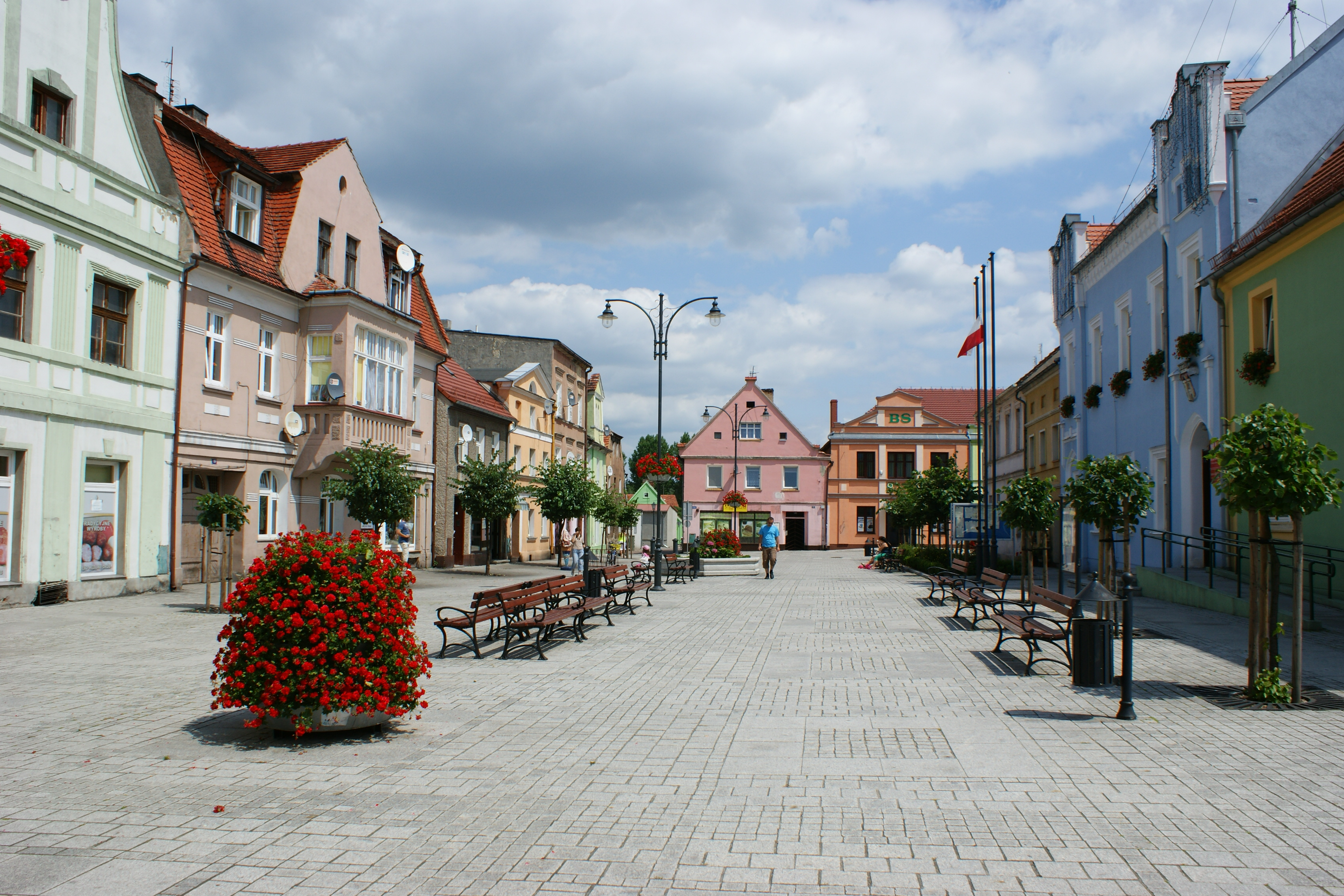
- Rynek (Market Square)

- Coat of arms

- Location within Poland
- Coordinates: 51°41′N 15°44′E
- Country: Poland
- Voivodeship: Lubusz
- County: Nowa Sól
- Gmina: Nowe Miasteczko
- Town rights: before 1296

Area
  - Total: 3.39 km^{2} (1.31 sq mi)

Population (2019-06-30)
  - Total: 2,756
  - Density: 813/km^{2} (2,110/sq mi)
- Time zone: UTC+1 (CET)
  - Summer (DST): UTC+2 (CEST)
- Postal code: 67-124
- Vehicle registration: FNW
- Website: http://www.nowemiasteczko.pl

Nowe Miasteczko [ˈnɔvɛ mʲasˈtɛt͡ʂkɔ] (German: Neustädtel) is a town in Nowa Sól County, Lubusz Voivodeship, in western Poland, with 2,756 inhabitants (2019).

== History ==
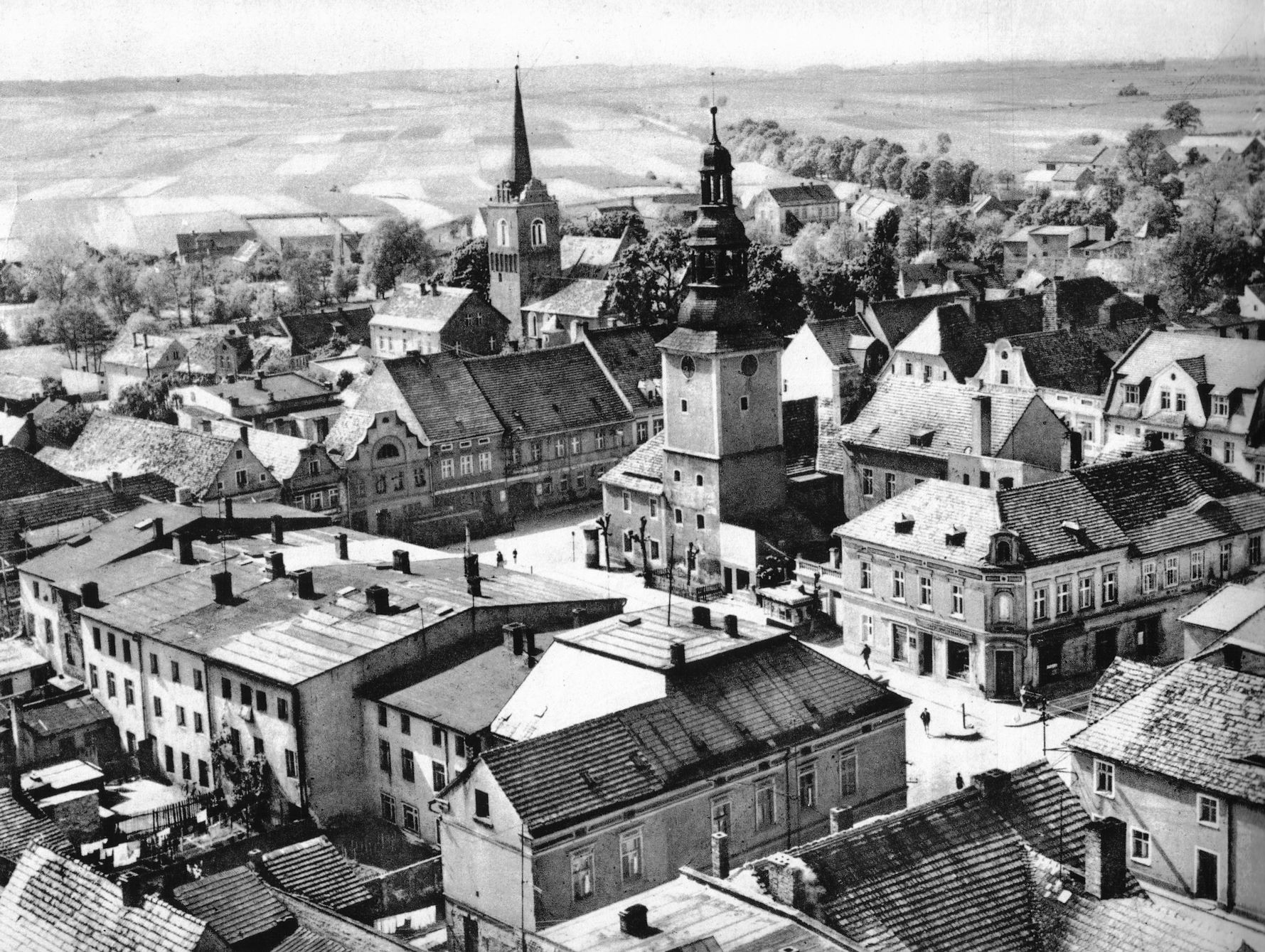
Nowe Miasteczko in the 1970s

The area became part of the emerging Polish state in the 10th century, and following the Poland's fragmentation into smaller provincial duchies, it was part of the duchies of Silesia, Głogów and Żagań. The town was first mentioned in a document of Henry III, Duke of Głogów from 1296, and was granted town rights before that date. In the 18th century, one of two main routes connecting Warsaw and Dresden ran through the town and Kings Augustus II the Strong and Augustus III of Poland traveled that route numerous times.

== Demographics ==
Historical population

Year	Pop.	±%
1843	1,312	—
1871	1,296	−1.2%
1880	1,314	+1.4%
1890	1,378	+4.9%
1900	1,450	+5.2%
1910	1,500	+3.4%

Year	Pop.	±%
1925	1,622	+8.1%
1939	1,708	+5.3%
1950	1,540	−9.8%
1960	2,421	+57.2%
2010	2,833	+17.0%

== Notable people ==
- Fritz Lubrich (1888–1971), German composer

== Twin towns – sister cities ==
See twin towns of Gmina Nowe Miasteczko.
