= Klimki, Lublin Voivodeship =

Klimki
- Village
- Location within Poland
- Coordinates: 51°58′26″N 22°18′48″E
- Country: Poland
- Voivodeship: Lublin
- County: Łuków
- Gmina: Łuków

Klimki [ˈklimki] is a village in the administrative district of Gmina Łuków, within Łuków County, Lublin Voivodeship, in eastern Poland.
