= Podgaj, Lublin Voivodeship =

Podgaj
- Village
- Location within Poland
- Coordinates: 51°54′26″N 22°24′30″E
- Country: Poland
- Voivodeship: Lublin
- County: Łuków
- Gmina: Łuków
- Population: 70

Podgaj [ˈpɔdɡai̯] is a village in the administrative district of Gmina Łuków, within Łuków County, Lublin Voivodeship, in eastern Poland.
