= Wólka Świątkowa =

- Village
- Location within Poland
- Coordinates: 51°58′N 22°24′E
- Country: Poland
- Voivodeship: Lublin
- County: Łuków
- Gmina: Łuków

Wólka Świątkowa (Polish pronunciation: [ˈvulka ɕfjɔntˈkɔva]) is a village in the administrative district of Gmina Łuków, within Łuków County, Lublin Voivodeship, in eastern Poland.
