= Żdżary, Lublin Voivodeship =

Żdżary
- Village
- Location within Poland
- Coordinates: 51°56′53″N 22°12′33″E
- Country: Poland
- Voivodeship: Lublin
- County: Łuków
- Gmina: Łuków

Żdżary [ˈʐd͡ʐarɨ] is a village in the administrative district of Gmina Łuków, within Łuków County, Lublin Voivodeship, in eastern Poland.
