= Nowa Gręzówka =

- Village
- Location within Poland
- Coordinates: 52°0′18″N 22°17′7″E
- Country: Poland
- Voivodeship: Lublin
- County: Łuków
- Gmina: Łuków
- Population: 396

Nowa Gręzówka [ˈnɔva ɡrɛ̃ˈzufka] is a village in the administrative district of Gmina Łuków, within Łuków County, Lublin Voivodeship, in eastern Poland.
