= Nieciecz, Lubusz Voivodeship =

Nieciecz
- Village
- Location within Poland
- Coordinates: 51°43′19″N 15°42′22″E
- Country: Poland
- Voivodeship: Lubusz
- County: Nowa Sól
- Gmina: Nowe Miasteczko

Nieciecz (Polish pronunciation: [ˈɲɛtɕɛtʂ]) is a village in the administrative district of Gmina Nowe Miasteczko, within Nowa Sól County, Lubusz Voivodeship, in western Poland.
