= Gmina Nowe Miasteczko =

Gmina Nowe Miasteczko Nowe Miasteczko Commune
- Gmina
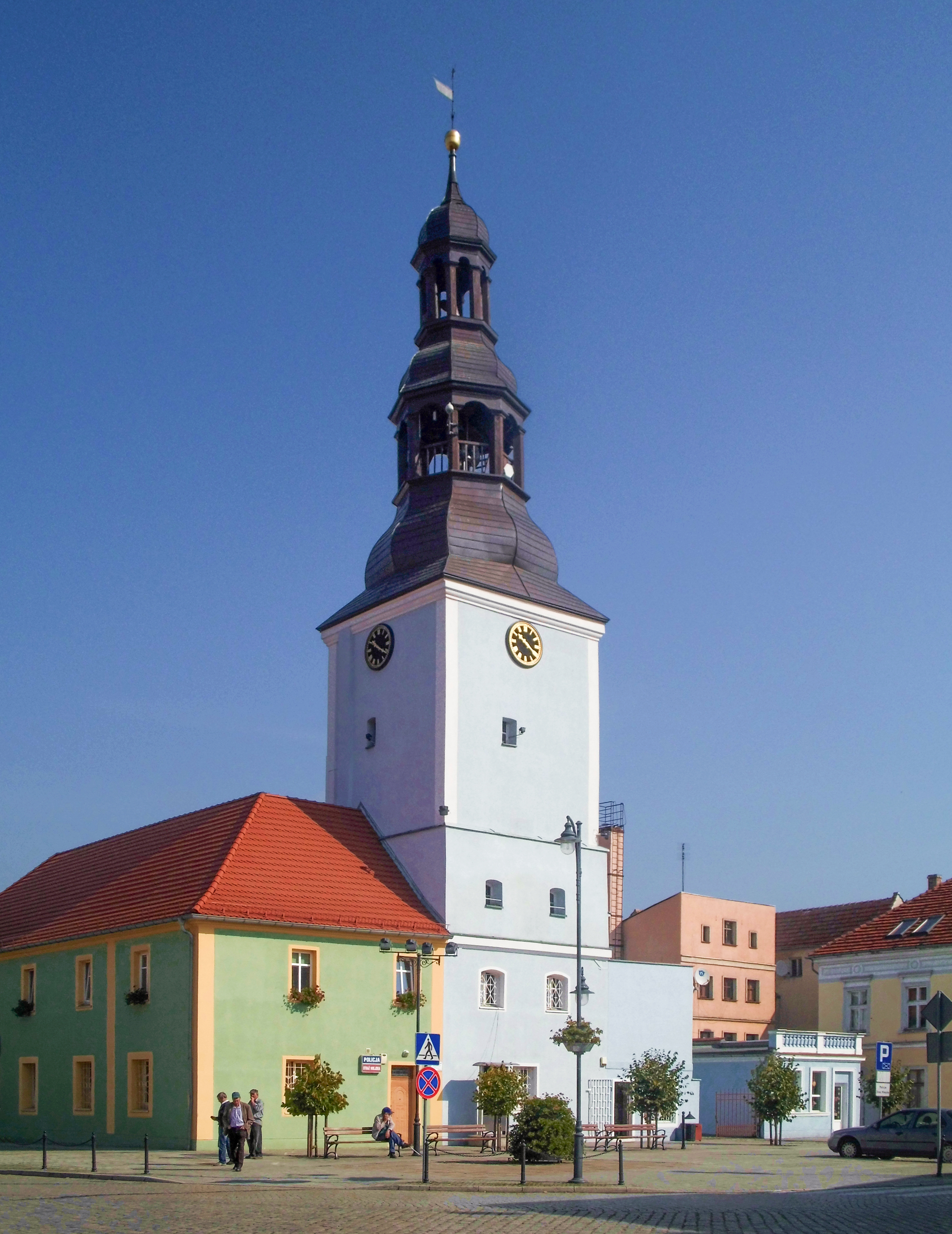
- Town Hall in Nowe Miasteczko, seat of the gmina office

- Coat of arms
- Interactive map of Gmina Nowe Miasteczko
- Coordinates (Nowe Miasteczko): 51°41′N 15°44′E
- Country: Poland
- Voivodeship: Lubusz
- County: Nowa Sól
- Seat: Nowe Miasteczko

Area
  - Total: 77.18 km^{2} (29.80 sq mi)

Population (2019-06-30)
  - Total: 5,377
  - Density: 69.67/km^{2} (180.4/sq mi)
  - Urban: 2,756
  - Rural: 2,621
- Time zone: UTC+1 (CET)
  - Summer (DST): UTC+2 (CEST)
- Website: http://www.nowemiasteczko.pl/

Gmina Nowe Miasteczko is an urban-rural gmina (administrative district) in Nowa Sól County, Lubusz Voivodeship, in western Poland. Its seat is the town of Nowe Miasteczko, which lies approximately 13 kilometres (8 mi) south of Nowa Sól and 33 km (21 mi) south-east of Zielona Góra.

The gmina covers an area of 77.18 square kilometres (29.8 sq mi), and as of 2019 its total population is 5,377.

== Villages ==
Apart from the town of Nowe Miasteczko, Gmina Nowe Miasteczko contains the villages and settlements of Borów Polski, Borów Wielki, Gołaszyn, Konin, Miłaków, Nieciecz, Popęszyce, Rejów, Szyba and Żuków.

== Neighbouring gminas ==
Gmina Nowe Miasteczko is bordered by the gminas of Bytom Odrzański, Kożuchów, Niegosławice, Nowa Sól and Szprotawa.

== Twin towns – sister cities ==
Gmina Nowe Miasteczko is twinned with:

- Bad Liebenwerda, Germany
- Storkow, Germany
