= Sięciaszka Pierwsza =

- Village
- Location within Poland
- Coordinates: 51°56′N 22°19′E
- Country: Poland
- Voivodeship: Lublin
- County: Łuków
- Gmina: Łuków

Sięciaszka Pierwsza [ɕɛnˈt͡ɕaʂka ˈpjɛrfʂa] is a village in the administrative district of Gmina Łuków, within Łuków County, Lublin Voivodeship, in eastern Poland.
