= Borów Polski =

- Village
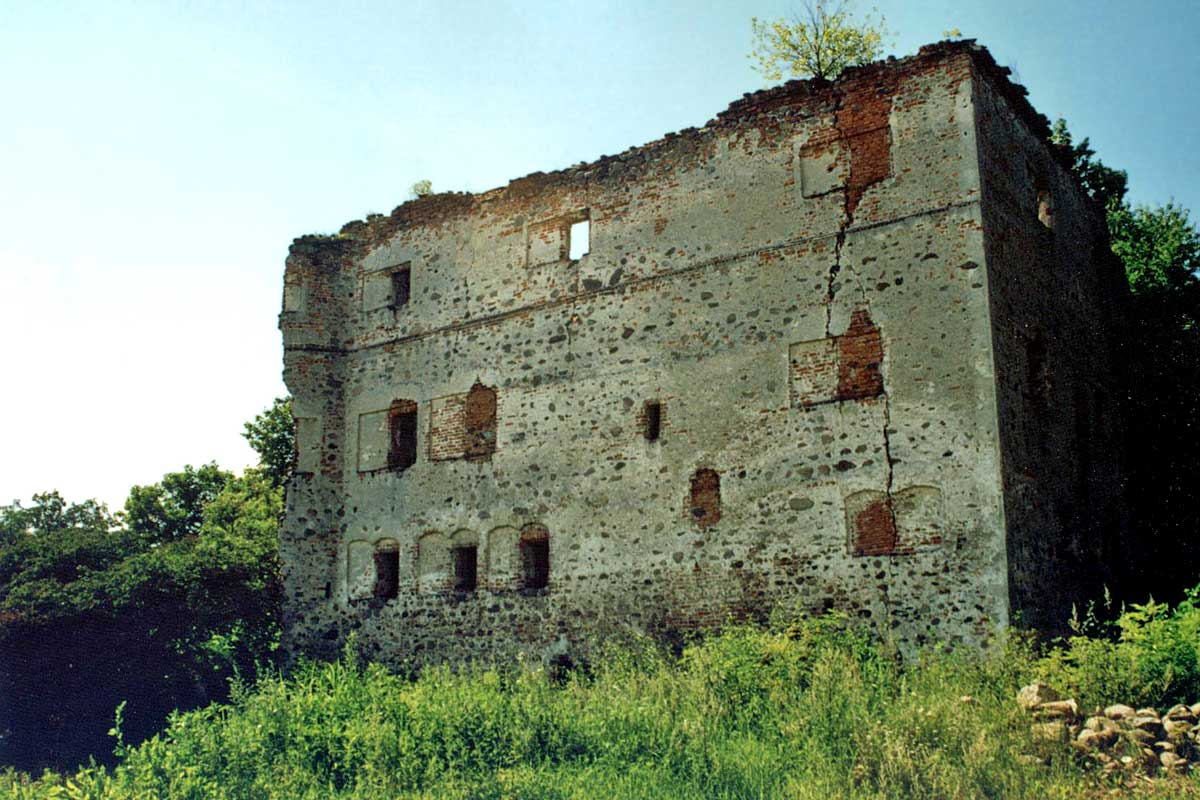
- Castle ruins

- Location within Poland
- Coordinates: 51°42′N 15°40′E
- Country: Poland
- Voivodeship: Lubusz
- County: Nowa Sól
- Gmina: Nowe Miasteczko
- Population: 100

Borów Polski [ˈbɔruf ˈpɔlski] is a village in the administrative district of Gmina Nowe Miasteczko, within Nowa Sól County, Lubusz Voivodeship, in western Poland.
