= Karwacz, Lublin Voivodeship =

Karwacz
- Village
- Location within Poland
- Coordinates: 51°56′44″N 22°25′39″E
- Country: Poland
- Voivodeship: Lublin
- County: Łuków
- Gmina: Łuków

Karwacz [ˈkarvat͡ʂ] is a village in the administrative district of Gmina Łuków, within Łuków County, Lublin Voivodeship, in eastern Poland.
