= Gmina Łuków =

Gmina Łuków Łuków Commune
- Gmina
- Coat of arms
- Interactive map of Gmina Łuków
- Coordinates (Łuków): 51°55′N 22°23′E
- Country: Poland
- Voivodeship: Lublin
- County: Łuków
- Seat: Łuków

Area
  - Total: 308.32 km^{2} (119.04 sq mi)

Population (2006)
  - Total: 16,547
  - Density: 53.668/km^{2} (139.00/sq mi)
- Website: http://www.lukow.ug.gov.pl/

Gmina Łuków is a rural gmina (administrative district) in Łuków County, Lublin Voivodeship, in eastern Poland. Its seat is the town of Łuków, although the town is not part of the territory of the gmina.

The gmina covers an area of 308.32 square kilometres (119.0 sq mi), and as of 2006, its total population was 16,547.

== Villages ==
Gmina Łuków contains the villages and settlements of Aleksandrów, Biardy, Czerśl, Dąbie, Dminin, Gołąbki, Gołaszyn, Gręzówka, Gręzówka-Kolonia, Jadwisin, Jeziory, Karwacz, Klimki, Kownatki, Krynka, Ławki, Łazy, Malcanów, Nowa Gręzówka, Podgaj, Role, Ryżki, Rzymy-Las, Rzymy-Rzymki, Sięciaszka Druga, Sięciaszka Pierwsza, Sięciaszka Trzecia, Strzyżew, Suchocin, Suleje, Świdry, Szczygły Dolne, Szczygły Górne, Turze Rogi, Wagram, Wólka Świątkowa, Zalesie, Zarzecz Łukowski and Żdżary.

== Neighbouring gminas ==
Gmina Łuków is bordered by the town of Łuków and the gminas of Domanice, Kąkolewnica Wschodnia, Stanin, Stoczek Łukowski, Trzebieszów, Ulan-Majorat, Wiśniew, Wojcieszków and Zbuczyn.
