= Sięciaszka Trzecia =

- Village
- Location within Poland
- Coordinates: 51°54′17″N 22°16′42″E
- Country: Poland
- Voivodeship: Lublin
- County: Łuków
- Gmina: Łuków
- Population: 57

Sięciaszka Trzecia [ɕɛnˈt͡ɕaʂka ˈtʂɛt͡ɕa] is a village in the administrative district of Gmina Łuków, within Łuków County, Lublin Voivodeship, in eastern Poland.
