= Jeziory, Lublin Voivodeship =

Jeziory
- Village
- Location within Poland
- Coordinates: 51°53′31″N 22°24′52″E
- Country: Poland
- Voivodeship: Lublin
- County: Łuków
- Gmina: Łuków

Jeziory [jɛˈʑɔrɨ] is a village in the administrative district of Gmina Łuków, within Łuków County, Lublin Voivodeship, in eastern Poland.
