= Turze Rogi =

- Village
- Location within Poland
- Coordinates: 51°55′9″N 22°28′11″E
- Country: Poland
- Voivodeship: Lublin
- County: Łuków
- Gmina: Łuków
- Population: 493

Turze Rogi [ˈtuʐɛ ˈrɔɡi] is a village in the administrative district of Gmina Łuków, within Łuków County, Lublin Voivodeship, in eastern Poland.
