= Wagram, Poland =

Wagram
- Village
- Location within Poland
- Coordinates: 51°54′30″N 22°30′12″E
- Country: Poland
- Voivodeship: Lublin
- County: Łuków
- Gmina: Łuków
- Population: 104

Wagram [ˈvaɡram] is a village in the administrative district of Gmina Łuków, within Łuków County, Lublin Voivodeship, in eastern Poland.
