= Gołaszyn, Lubusz Voivodeship =

Gołaszyn
- Village
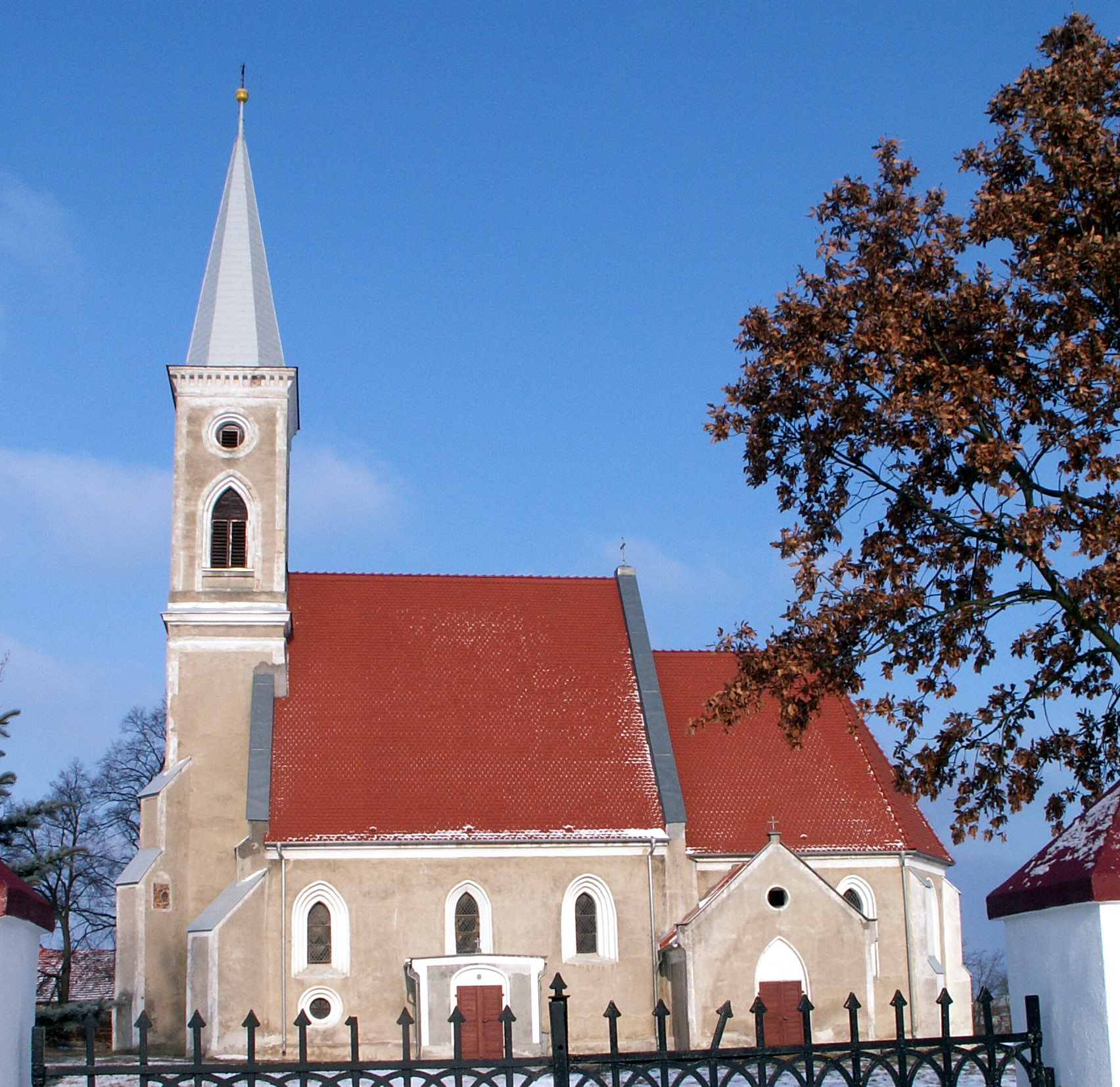
- Catholic church

- Location within Poland
- Coordinates: 51°42′3″N 15°43′48″E
- Country: Poland
- Voivodeship: Lubusz
- County: Nowa Sól
- Gmina: Nowe Miasteczko
- Population: 112

Gołaszyn [ɡɔˈwaʂɨn] is a village in the administrative district of Gmina Nowe Miasteczko, within Nowa Sól County, Lubusz Voivodeship, in western Poland.
