= Gołaszyn, Lublin Voivodeship =

Gołaszyn
- Village
- Location within Poland
- Coordinates: 51°57′N 22°21′E
- Country: Poland
- Voivodeship: Lublin
- County: Łuków
- Gmina: Łuków
- Population: 975

Gołaszyn [ɡɔˈwaʂɨn] is a village in the administrative district of Gmina Łuków, within Łuków County, Lublin Voivodeship, in eastern Poland.
