= Krynka, Lublin Voivodeship =

Krynka
- Village
- Location within Poland
- Coordinates: 52°0′12″N 22°23′17″E
- Country: Poland
- Voivodeship: Lublin
- County: Łuków
- Gmina: Łuków
- Population: 1,300

Krynka [ˈkrɨnka] is a village in the administrative district of Gmina Łuków, within Łuków County, Lublin Voivodeship, in eastern Poland.
