= Strzyżew, Lublin Voivodeship =

Strzyżew
- Village
- Location within Poland
- Coordinates: 51°55′13″N 22°30′34″E
- Country: Poland
- Voivodeship: Lublin
- County: Łuków
- Gmina: Łuków
- Population: 780

Strzyżew [ˈstʂɨʐɛf] is a village in the administrative district of Gmina Łuków, within Łuków County, Lublin Voivodeship, in eastern Poland.
