= Kownatki, Lublin Voivodeship =

Kownatki
- Village
- Location within Poland
- Coordinates: 51°54′37″N 22°31′47″E
- Country: Poland
- Voivodeship: Lublin
- County: Łuków
- Gmina: Łuków

Kownatki [kɔvˈnatki] is a village in the administrative district of Gmina Łuków, within Łuków County, Lublin Voivodeship, in eastern Poland.
