= Manie =

- Village
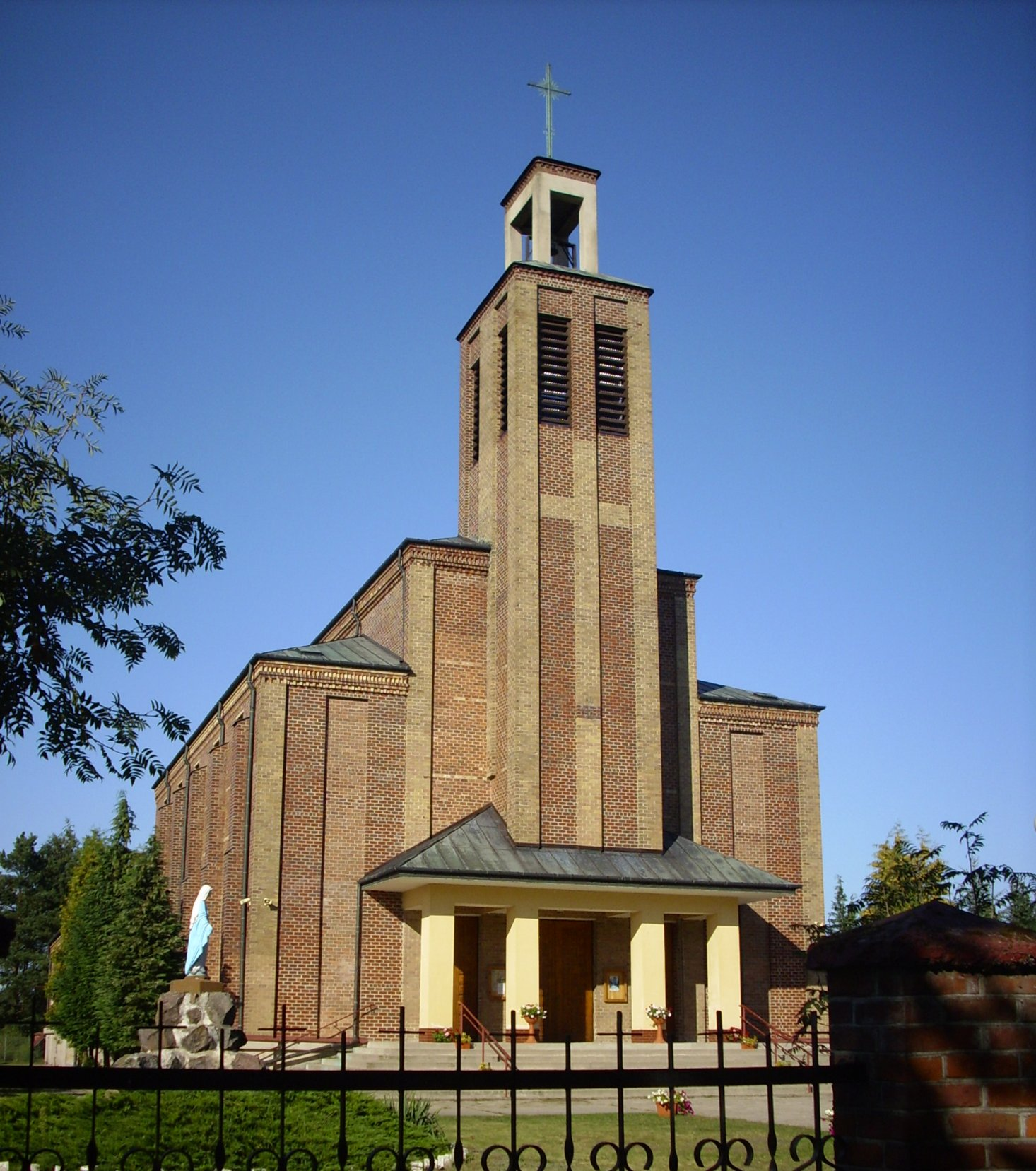
- Our Lady of Perpetual Help church in Manie

- Location within Poland
- Coordinates: 52°3′N 22°47′E
- Country: Poland
- Voivodeship: Lublin
- County: Biała
- Gmina: Międzyrzec Podlaski
- Time zone: UTC+1 (CET)
  - Summer (DST): UTC+2 (CEST)

Manie [ˈmaɲɛ] is a village in the administrative district of Gmina Międzyrzec Podlaski, within Biała County, Lublin Voivodeship, in eastern Poland.

== History ==
Twelve Polish citizens were murdered by Nazi Germany in the village during World War II.
