= Bucze Żagańskie railway station =

Former railway station in Bucze, Poland

Bucze Żagańskie

General information
- Location: Bucze, Lubusz Voivodeship; Poland
- Coordinates: 51°27′34.00″N 14°58′20.05″E
- Owner: Polish State Railways
- Line: Jankowa Żagańska–Sanice railway
- Platforms: 1

History
- Opened: 17 August 1908
- Closed: 16 May 1953
- Former names: Buchwalde (1908–1945); Bukojna (1945–1947); Bucze (1947)
Location
- Location within Poland

Bucze Żagańskie was a railway station on the Jankowa Żagańska–Sanice railway in the village of Bucze, Żary County, within the Lubusz Voivodeship in western Poland.

== History ==
The station opened as Buchwalde on 17 August 1908. After World War II, the area came under Polish administration. As a result, the station was taken over by Polish State Railways, and was renamed to Bukojna. It was renamed to Bucze in 1947, and later to its modern name, Bucze Żagańskie, in 1947.

Passenger services were withdrawn from Bucze Żagańskie in 1953.

== Former services ==
Preceding station	Disused railways	Following station
Przewóz towards Jankowa Żagańska	Polish State Railways; Jankowa Żagańska–Lodenau	Lipa Łużycka towards Lodenau
