= Wymiarki railway station =

Former railway station in Wymiarki, Poland

Wymiarki
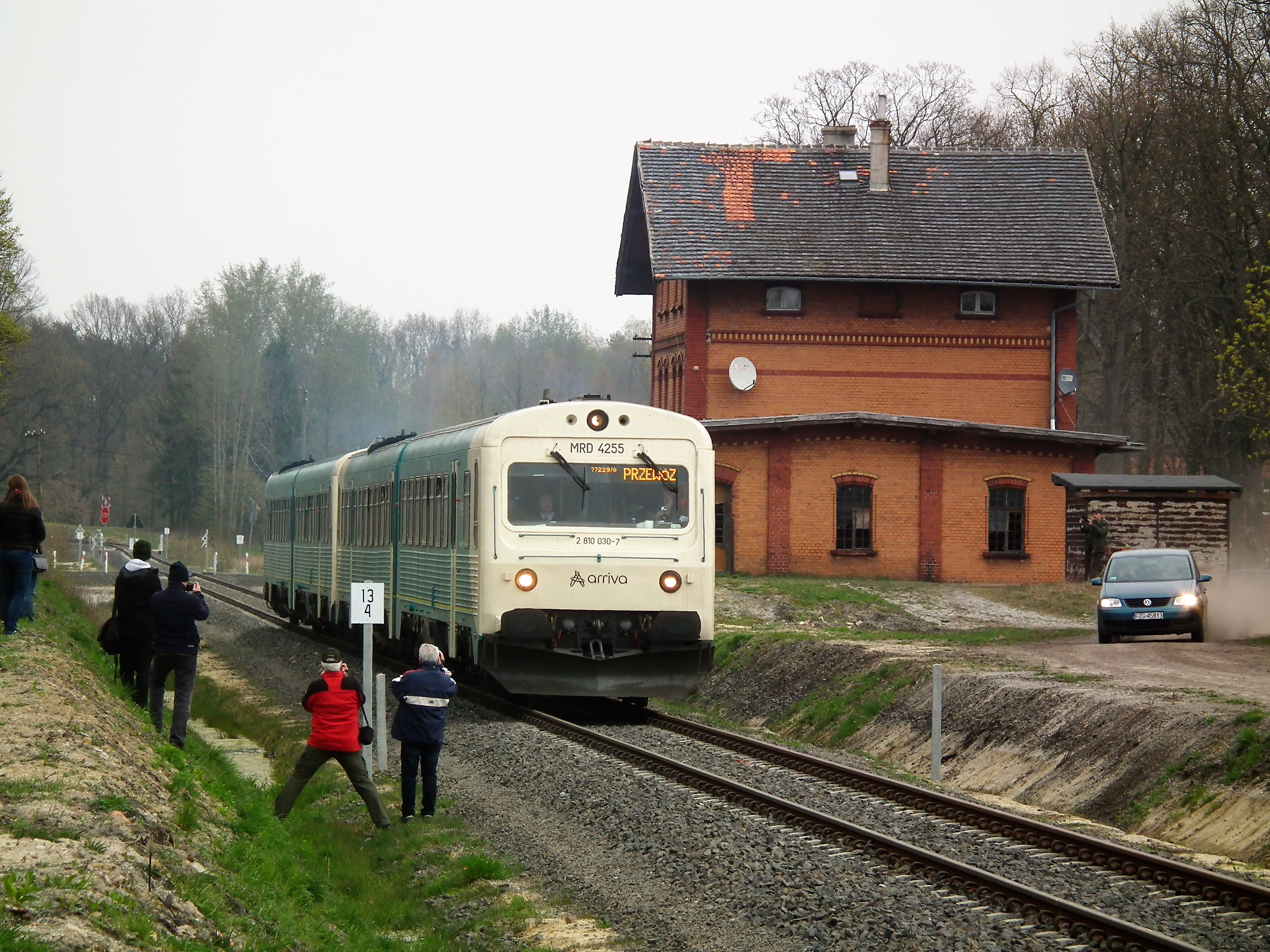
- A special service passing the station in 2019, during the unveiling of the newly rebuilt railway.

General information
- Location: Wymiarki, Lubusz Voivodeship; Poland
- Coordinates: 51°30′46.08″N 15°04′38.02″E
- Line: Jankowa Żagańska–Sanice railway
- Platforms: 2

History
- Opened: 1 October 1895
- Closed: 2 June 1984
- Former names: Wiesau (1895–1945); Łuków Żegański (1945–1946); Łuków Żagański (1946–1947)
Location
- Location within Poland

Wymiarki was a railway station on the Jankowa Żagańska–Sanice railway in the village of Wymiarki, Żagań County, within the Lubusz Voivodeship in western Poland.

== History ==
The station opened as Wiesau on 1 October 1895. After World War II, the area came under Polish administration. As a result, the station was taken over by Polish State Railways, and was renamed to Łuków Żegański. It was renamed to its modern name, Wymiarki, in 1947. Until 2016, sidings branched off the station to local glassworks. They were dismantled during the reconstruction of the line.

Passenger services were withdrawn from Wymiarki on 2 June 1984. The station served as a freight top until 2004.

== Former services ==
| Preceding station | Disused railways | Following station |
|---|---|---|
| Witoszyn Górny towards Jankowa Żagańska | Polish State Railways; Jankowa Żagańska–Sanice | Straszów towards Sanice |
