= Straszów railway station =

Former railway station in Straszów, Poland

Straszów
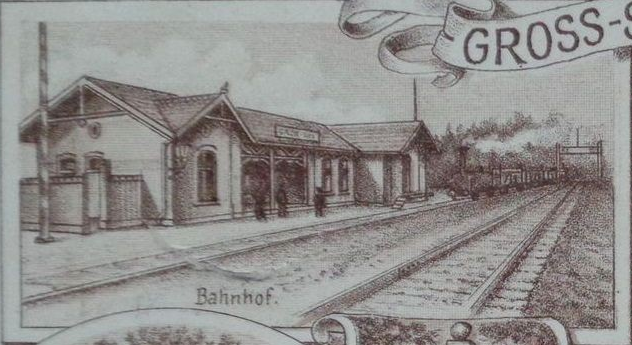
- 1898 postcard of the station

General information
- Location: Straszów, Lubusz Voivodeship; Poland
- Coordinates: 51°30′37.03″N 15°01′00.04″E
- Line: Jankowa Żagańska–Sanice railway

History
- Opened: 1 October 1895
- Closed: 30 May 1981
- Former names: Groß Selten (1895–1945); Żelatów (1945–1947)
Location
- Location within Poland

Straszów was a railway station on the Jankowa Żagańska–Sanice railway in the village of Straszów, Żary County, within the Lubusz Voivodeship in western Poland.

== History ==
The station opened as Groß Selten on 1 October 1895. After World War II, the area came under Polish administration. As a result, the station was taken over by Polish State Railways, and was renamed to Żelatów. It was renamed to its modern name, Straszów, in 1947.

Passenger services were withdrawn from Straszów on 30 May 1981. It was demolished in 2018.

== Former services ==
Preceding station	Disused railways	Following station
Wymiarki towards Jankowa Żagańska	Polish State Railways; Jankowa Żagańska–Sanice	Przewóz towards Sanice
