= Mirostowice Górne railway station =

Former railway station in Mirostowice Górne, Poland

Mirostowice Górne
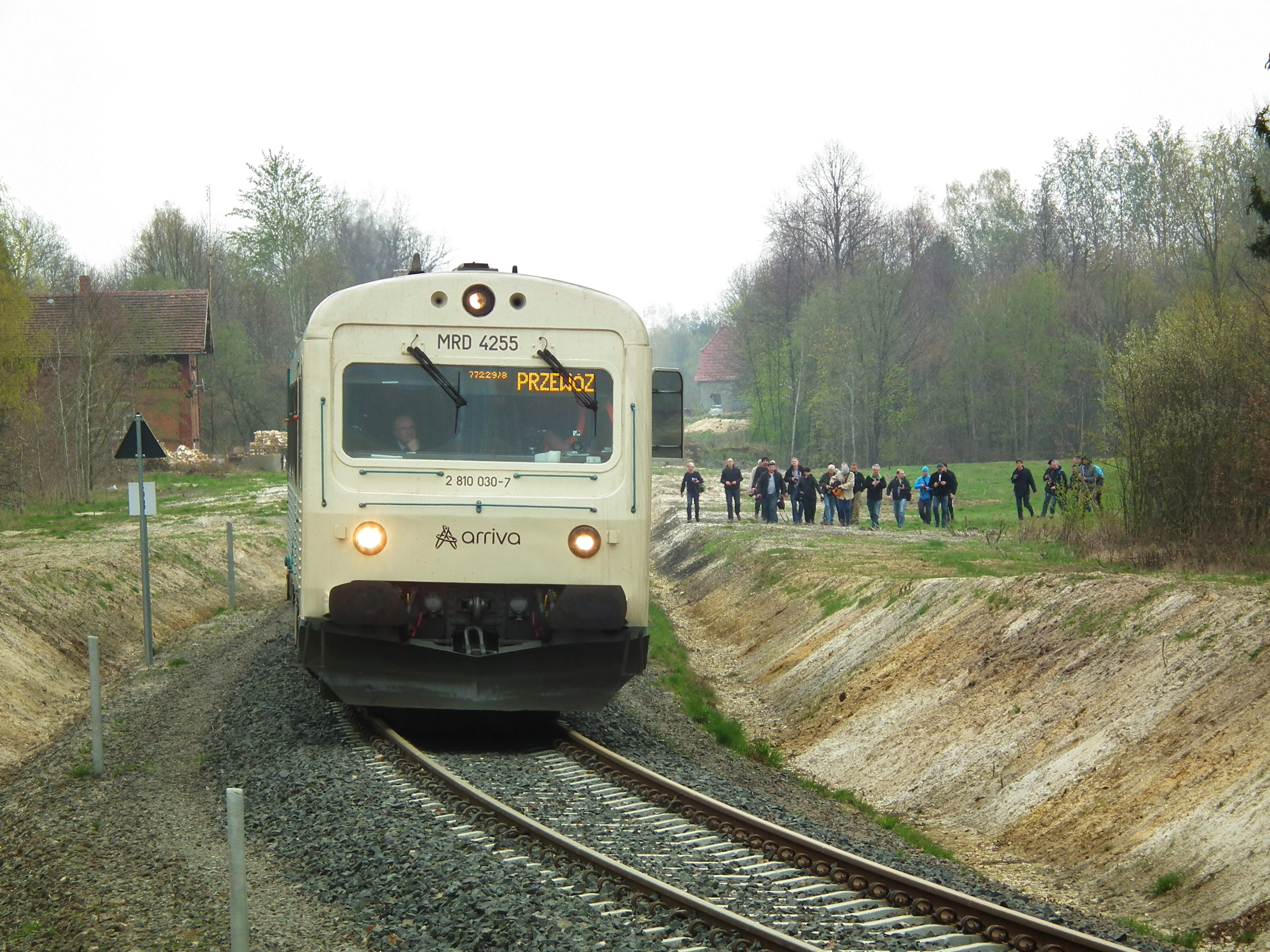
- A special service leaving the station in 2019, during the unveiling of the newly rebuilt railway.

General information
- Location: Mirostowice Górne, Lubusz Voivodeship; Poland
- Coordinates: 51°34′13.07″N 15°06′22.01″E
- Line: Jankowa Żagańska–Sanice railway
- Platforms: 1

History
- Opened: 1 October 1895
- Closed: 1985
- Former names: Ober Ullersdorf (1895–1945); Ołdrzychowice Górne (1945–1947)
Location
- Location within Poland

Mirostowice Górne was a railway station on the Jankowa Żagańska–Sanice railway in the village of Mirostowice Górne, Żary County, within the Lubusz Voivodeship in western Poland.

== History ==
The station opened as Ober Ullersdorf on 1 October 1895. After World War II, the area came under Polish administration. As a result, the station was taken over by Polish State Railways, and was renamed to Ołdrzychowice Górne. It was renamed to its modern name, Mirostowice Górne, in 1947.

Passenger services were withdrawn from Mirostowice Górne in 1985.

== Former services ==
| Preceding station | Disused railways | Following station |
|---|---|---|
| Stawnik towards Jankowa Żagańska | Polish State Railways; Jankowa Żagańska–Sanice | Witoszyn Górny towards Sanice |
