= Mirostowice Dolne railway station =

Former railway station in Mirostowice Dolne, Poland

Mirostowice Dolne
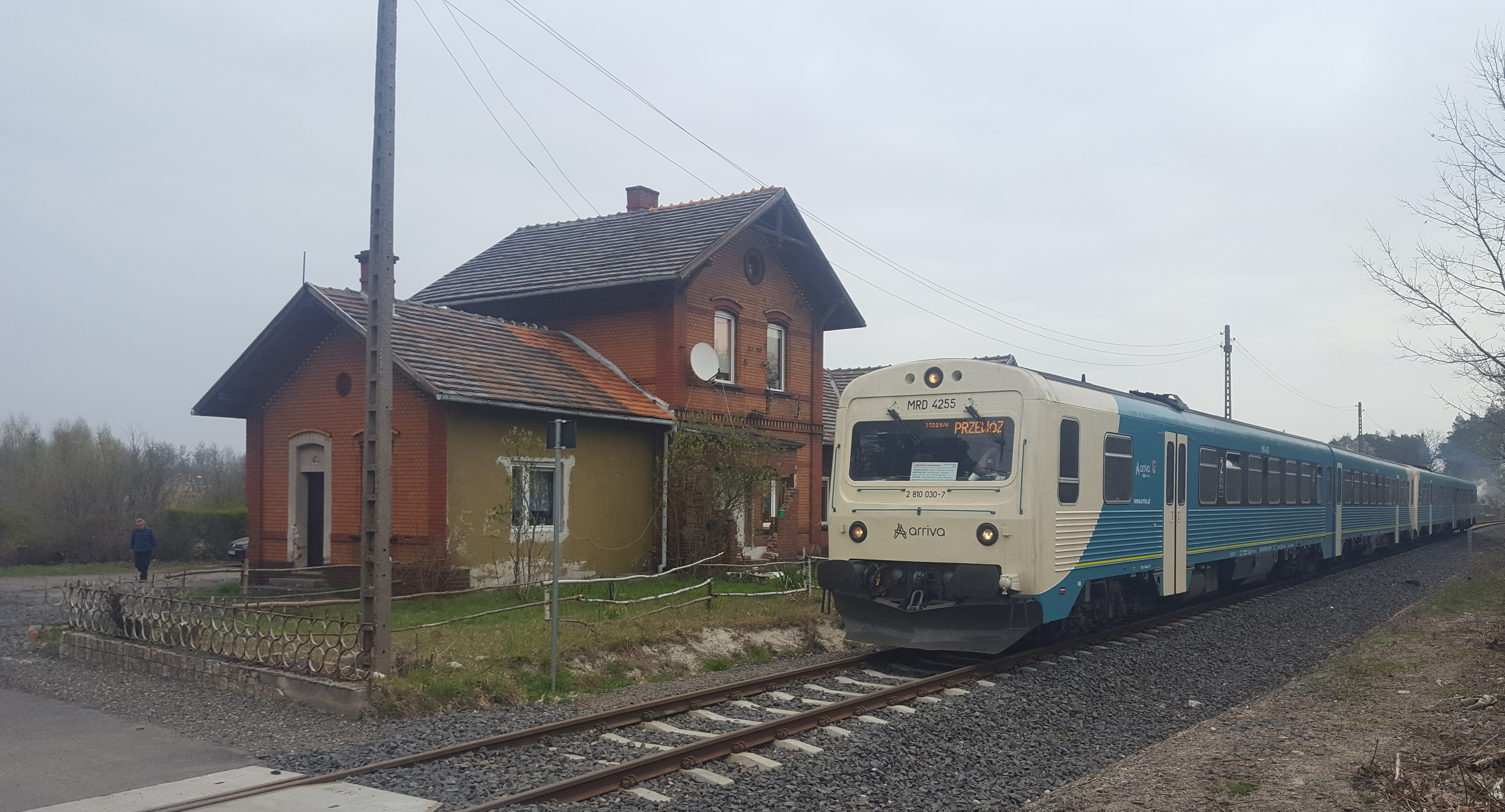
- A special service leaving the station in 2019, during the unveiling of the newly rebuilt railway.

General information
- Location: Mirostowice Dolne, Lubusz Voivodeship; Poland
- Coordinates: 51°34′11.07″N 15°09′19.00″E
- Line: Jankowa Żagańska–Sanice railway
- Platforms: 1

History
- Opened: 1 October 1895
- Closed: 2 June 1984
- Former names: Nieder Ullersdorf (1895–1945); Ołdrzychowice (1945–1947)
Location
- Location within Poland

Mirostowice Dolne was a railway station on the Jankowa Żagańska–Sanice railway in the village of Mirostowice Dolne, Żary County, within the Lubusz Voivodeship in western Poland.

== History ==
The station opened as Nieder Ullersdorf on 1 October 1895, serving incoming freight trains from the Mirostowice ceramics factory. After World War II, the area came under Polish administration. As a result, the station was taken over by Polish State Railways, and was renamed to Ołdrzychowice. It was renamed to its modern name, Mirostowice Dolne, in 1947.

The station was home to a fuel depot, which doubled as a reversing siding for locomotives from the roundhouse in Żagań.

Passenger services were withdrawn from Mirostowice Dolne on 2 June 1984. The sidings that branched from the station closed in 2000, and were dismantled in 2014.

== Former services ==
Preceding station	Disused railways	Following station
Jankowa Żagańska; Terminus	Polish State Railways; Jankowa Żagańska–Sanice	Stawnik towards Sanice
