= Witoszyn Górny railway station =

Former railway station in Witoszyn Górny, Poland

Witoszyn Górny

General information
- Location: Witoszyn Górny, Lubusz Voivodeship; Poland
- Coordinates: 51°32′18.04″N 15°04′57.00″E
- Line: Jankowa Żagańska–Sanice railway
- Platforms: 1

History
- Opened: 1 October 1895
- Closed: 21 May 1955
- Former names: Ober Hartmannsdorf (1895–1945); Twierdzin Górny (1945–1947)
Location
- Location within Poland

Witoszyn Górny was a railway station on the Jankowa Żagańska–Sanice railway in the village of Witoszyn Górny, Żagań County, within the Lubusz Voivodeship in western Poland.

== History ==
The station was opened by the Lusatian Railway Company as Ober Hartmannsdorf on 1 October 1895. After World War II, the area came under Polish administration. As a result, the station was taken over by Polish State Railways, and was renamed to Twierdzin Górny. It was renamed to its modern name, Witoszyn Górny, in 1947.

Passenger services were withdrawn from Witoszyn Górny on 21 May 1955.

== Former services ==
Preceding station	Disused railways	Following station
Mirostowice Górne towards Jankowa Żagańska	Polish State Railways; Jankowa Żagańska–Sanice	Wymiarki towards Sanice
