= Przewóz railway station =

Former railway station in Przewóz, Poland

Przewóz
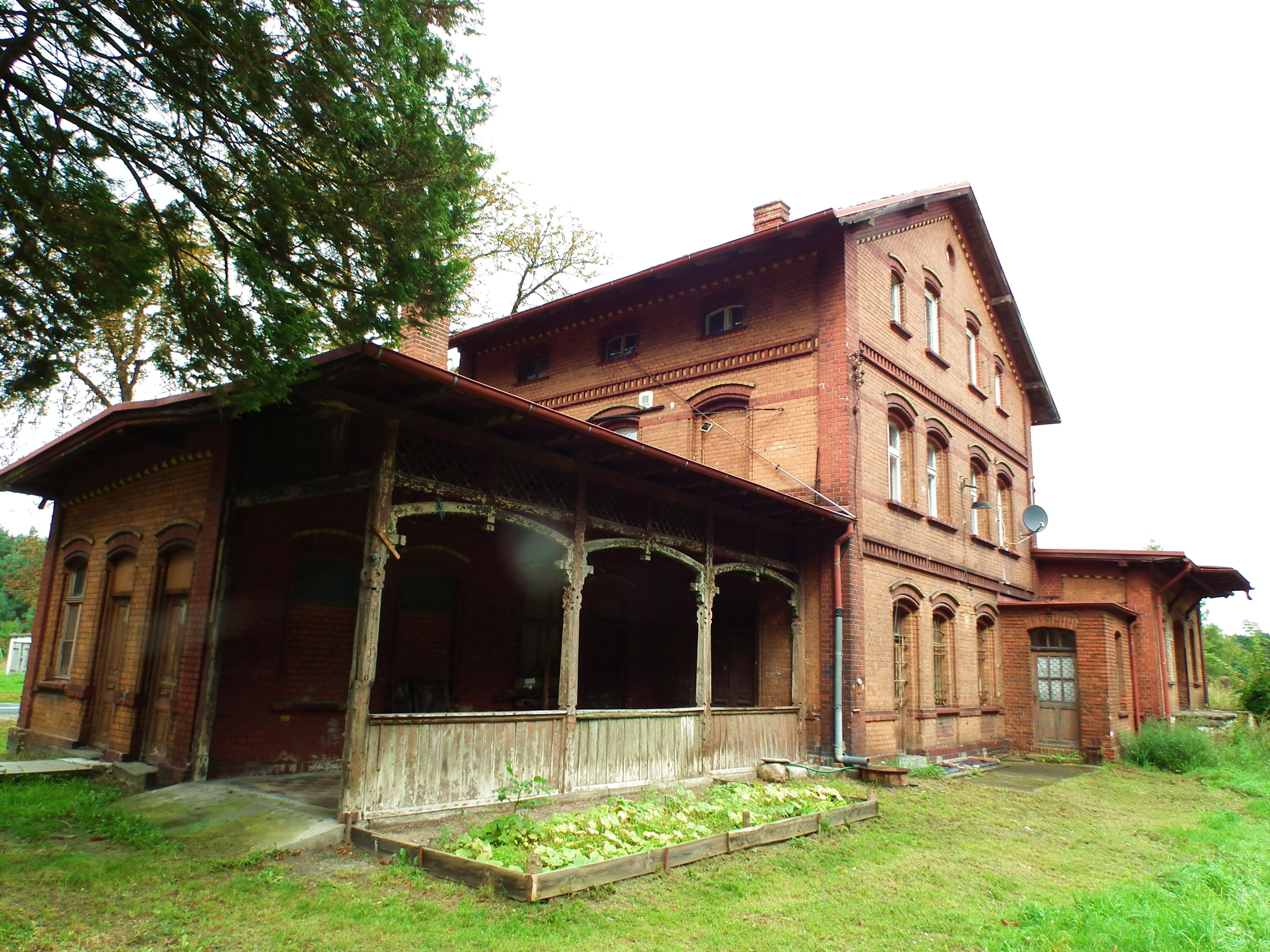
- Station building in 2017

General information
- Location: Przewóz, Lubusz Voivodeship; Poland
- Coordinates: 51°29′00.05″N 14°57′27.09″E
- Owner: Polish State Railways
- Lines: Jankowa Żagańska–Sanice railway; Przewóz–Przysieka railway

History
- Opened: 1 October 1895
- Closed: 30 May 1981
- Former names: Priebus (1895–1945)
Location
- Location within Poland

Przewóz was a railway station in the village of Przewóz, Żary County, within the Lubusz Voivodeship in western Poland.

== History ==
The station opened as Priebus on 1 October 1895. The Lusatian Railway Company planned to extend the Ruszów–Gozdnica railway to Przewóz to connect with the Jankowa Żagańska–Sanice railway, however the plans never went forward due to the outbreak of World War I. After World War II, the area came under Polish administration. As a result, the station was taken over by Polish State Railways, and was renamed to Przewóz.

Passenger services were withdrawn from Przewóz on 30 May 1981. With the re-opening of the Jankowa Żagańska–Sanice railway after it was rebuilt in 2019, Przewóz now serves as the terminus of the line.

== Former services ==
Preceding station	Disused railways	Following station
Straszów towards Jankowa Żagańska	Polish State Railways; Jankowa Żagańska–Lodenau	Bucze Żagańskie towards Sanice
