= Stawnik railway station =

Former railway station in Stawnik, Poland

Stawnik

General information
- Location: Stawnik, Lubusz Voivodeship; Poland
- Coordinates: 51°34′05.05″N 15°07′29.01″E
- Line: Jankowa Żagańska–Sanice railway
- Platforms: 1

History
- Opened: 1 October 1895
- Closed: 16 May 1953
- Former names: Teichdorf (1895–1945); Stawsk (1945–1947)
Location
- Location within Poland

Stawnik was a railway station on the Jankowa Żagańska–Sanice railway in the village of Stawnik, Żary County, within the Lubusz Voivodeship in western Poland.

== History ==
The station opened as Teichdorf on 1 October 1895. The station was built to serve a local factory and brickyard, were at the time a narrow-gauge railway ran from the station. After World War II, the area came under Polish administration. As a result, the station was taken over by Polish State Railways, and was renamed to Stawsk. It was renamed to its modern name, Stawnik, in 1947.

Passenger services were withdrawn from Stawnik on 16 May 1953. The station was demolished in 1959.

== Former services ==
| Preceding station | Disused railways | Following station |
|---|---|---|
| Mirostowice Dolne towards Jankowa Żagańska | Polish State Railways; Jankowa Żagańska–Sanice | Mirostowice Górne towards Sanice |
