= Sobolice =

Sobolice may refer to the following places:

- Sobolice, Nowa Sól County in Lubusz Voivodeship (west Poland)
- Sobolice, Zielona Góra County in Lubusz Voivodeship (west Poland)
- Sobolice, Żary County in Lubusz Voivodeship (west Poland)
