= Lipa Łużycka railway station =

Former railway station in Lipna, Poland

Lipa Łużycka
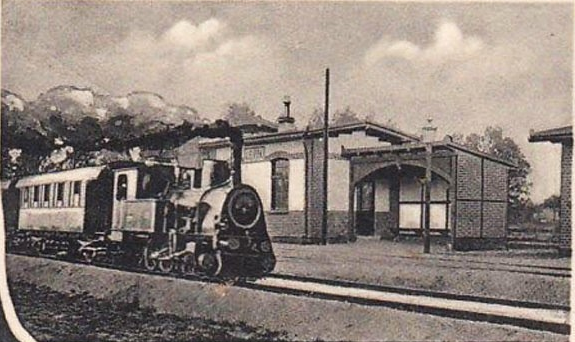
- Station in 1909

General information
- Location: Lipna, Lubusz Voivodeship; Poland
- Coordinates: 51°26′09.07″N 14°59′36.02″E
- Owner: Polish State Railways
- Line: Jankowa Żagańska–Sanice railway
- Platforms: 1

History
- Opened: 17 August 1908
- Closed: 31 May 1981
- Former names: Dobers-Leippa (1908–1936); Selingersruh (1936–1945); Załomiec (1945–1947)
Location
- Location within Poland

Lipa Łużycka was a railway station on the Jankowa Żagańska–Sanice railway in the village of Lipna, Żary County, within the Lubusz Voivodeship in western Poland.

== History ==
The station opened as Dobers-Leippa on 17 August 1908. It was renamed to Selingersruh in 1936. After World War II, the area came under Polish administration. As a result, the station was taken over by Polish State Railways, and was renamed to Załomiec. It was renamed to its modern name, Lipa Łużycka, in 1947.

Passenger services were withdrawn from Lipa Łużycka on 31 May 1981.

== Former services ==
Preceding station	Disused railways	Following station
Bucze Żagańskie towards Jankowa Żagańska	Polish State Railways; Jankowa Żagańska–Sanice	Sanice; Terminus
