= Hans Erasmus Aßmann =

Hans Erasmus Aßmann, Freiherr von Abschatz (4 February 1646 – 22 April 1699) was a statesman and poet from the second Silesian school. He lived in Bohemia.

== Life ==
Family von Abschatz Coat of Arms

Abschatz was born at Würbitz (Wierzbnica) in Lower Silesia in the Bohemian crown lands of the Holy Roman Empire. Even though his parents died early, Abschatz attended college in Liegnitz and then studied law at the universities of Strasbourg and Leyden. This was followed by a three-year travel to Belgium, France, and Italy. Returning to Silesia at the age of 23, he assumed the administration of his estate and married Anna von Hund in 1669. His financial condition was favourable and his private life fortunate, only disturbed by the death of few close relatives.

With the death of the last Silesian Piast (Duke George William) and the annexation of Silesia to Austria, the talent he showed in the administration of his manors led Abschatz to enter political life. He was twice a representative to the imperial court at Vienna: the first time as a syndic for the Duchy of Liegnitz, the second time as a representative for all Silesian lands. Emperor Leopold I made him a baron (Freiherr). In 1679, Abschatz was elected to be a permanent deputy of Legnica to the diet of the Silesian sovereigns (the so-called Fürstentage in Breslau).

Through his public service, he gained the respect of his fellow countrymen and acquired what he once claimed to be the highest tribute to a life's work — an inscription on his tombstone saying he was an honest man in his fatherland.

== Poet ==
Abschatz is considered to be a member of the school of poetry called second Silesian school (Zweite Schlesische Schule), together with writers such as Daniel Casper von Lohenstein, Andreas Gryphius, Gottfried Benjamin Hancke and Christian Hoffmann von Hoffmannswaldau. He was a close friend of Lohenstein. Abschatz was also an accurate translator, translating Il pastor fido.

Today, Abschatz is notable by the very fact that he — a nobleman — was interested in poetry at all. At that time, it was seen as a sign of change in the attitude towards literature and signaled that Germany could keep pace with the literary development of France and England. He also alluded to his hopes in this direction. He is quoted that:

Nobility without personal merit is nothing but an empty house on foreign grounds. And while it is at first assigned with the governmental and military affairs, it is only the blossom of his mind which can grant to it the highest fame.

== Sources ==
- Allgemeine Deutsche Biographie - online version at Wikisource
