= Otwiernica =

Location
- Country: Poland

Physical characteristics
- Mouth
  - location: Czernica
  - coordinates: 51.4873°N 15.0934°E

Basin features
- Progression: Czernica→ Czerna Mała→ Czerna Wielka→ Bóbr→ Oder→ Baltic Sea

Otwiernica is a small river of southwestern Poland. It flows into the Czernica near Wymiarki.
