= Lubieszów =

Lubieszów may refer to the following places:

- Lubieszów, Nowa Sól County in Lubusz Voivodeship (west Poland)
- Lubieszów, Żagań County in Lubusz Voivodeship (west Poland)
- Lubieszów, Opole Voivodeship (south-west Poland)
- Lyubeshiv, Ukraine
