= Popowo, Nowa Sól County =

Popowo
- Village
- Location within Poland
- Coordinates: 51°41′N 15°48′E
- Country: Poland
- Voivodeship: Lubusz
- County: Nowa Sól
- Gmina: Bytom Odrzański
- Population: 63

Popowo ([pɔˈpɔvɔ]; German: Poppe) is a village in the administrative district of Gmina Bytom Odrzański, within Nowa Sól County, Lubusz Voivodeship, in western Poland.
