= Piotrów, Lubusz Voivodeship =

Piotrów
- Village
- Location within Poland
- Coordinates: 51°32′50″N 14°56′40″E
- Country: Poland
- Voivodeship: Lubusz
- County: Żary
- Gmina: Przewóz

Piotrów [ˈpjɔtruf] is a village in the administrative district of Gmina Przewóz, within Żary County, Lubusz Voivodeship, in western Poland, close to the German border.
