= Kropiwnik =

- Village
- Location within Poland
- Coordinates: 51°41′27″N 15°51′59″E
- Country: Poland
- Voivodeship: Lubusz
- County: Nowa Sól
- Gmina: Bytom Odrzański

Kropiwnik [krɔˈpivnik] is a village in the administrative district of Gmina Bytom Odrzański, within Nowa Sól County, Lubusz Voivodeship, in western Poland.
