= Jamno, Żary County =

Jamno
- Village
- Location within Poland
- Coordinates: 51°27′N 15°1′E
- Country: Poland
- Voivodeship: Lubusz
- County: Żary
- Gmina: Przewóz

Jamno [ˈjamnɔ] is a village in the administrative district of Gmina Przewóz, within Żary County, Lubusz Voivodeship, in western Poland, close to the German border.
