= Bytom Odrzański =

Town in Lubusz Voivodeship, Poland

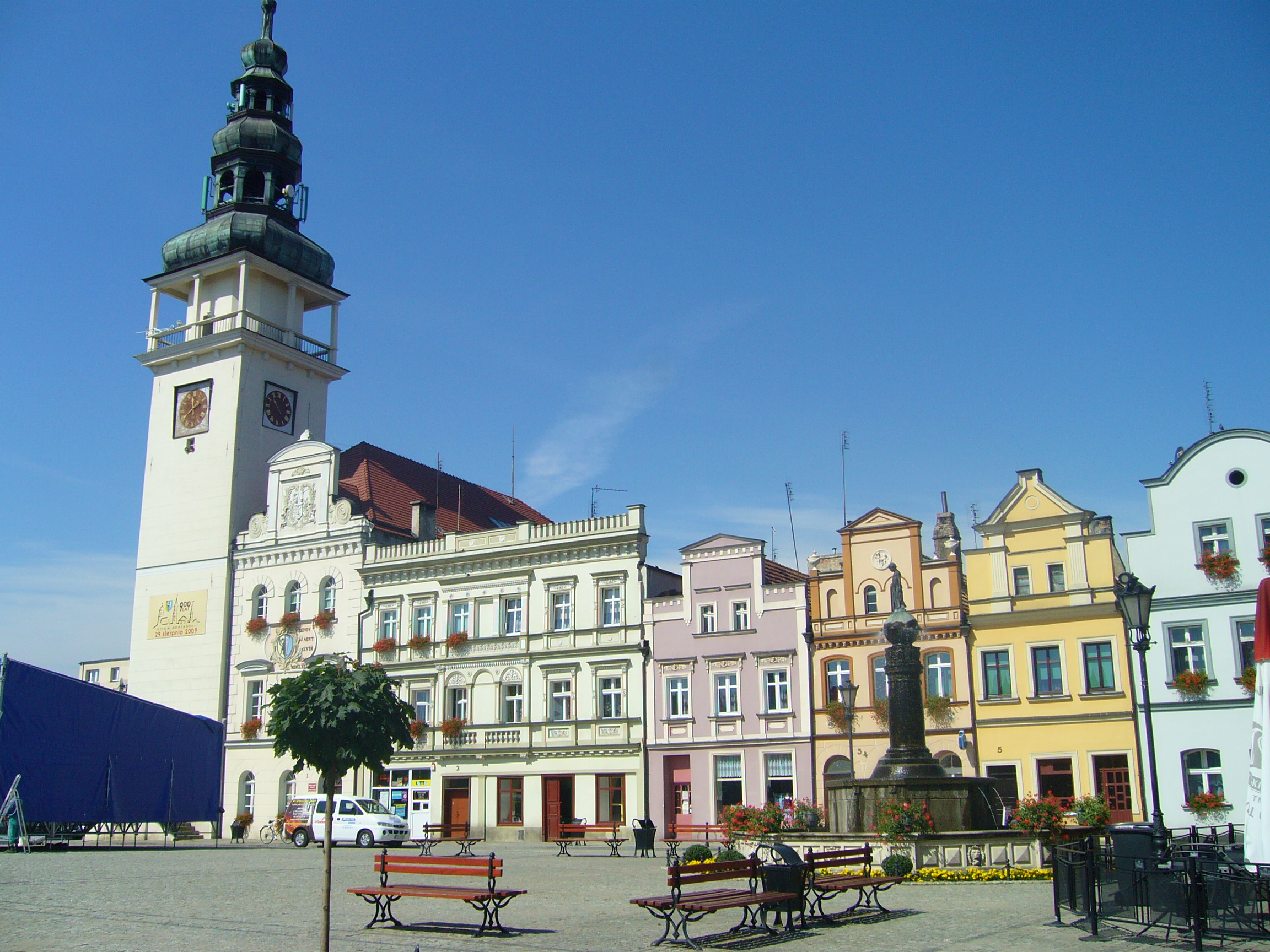
- Market Square (Rynek) in Bytom Odrzański

- Flag Coat of arms

- Location within Poland
- Coordinates: 51°44′N 15°49′E
- Country: Poland
- Voivodeship: Lubusz
- County: Nowa Sól
- Gmina: Bytom Odrzański

Government
  - Mayor: Jacek Sauter

Area
  - Total: 10 km^{2} (3.9 sq mi)

Population (31 December 2021)
  - Total: 4,191
  - Density: 420/km^{2} (1,100/sq mi)
- Time zone: UTC+1 (CET)
  - Summer (DST): UTC+2 (CEST)
- Postal code: 67-115
- Area code: +48 68
- Vehicle registration: FNW
- Website: http://www.bytomodrzanski.pl/

Bytom Odrzański [ˈbɨtɔm ɔˈdʐaɲskʲi] (Note: German: Beuthen an der Oder) is a town on the bank of the Oder river in western Poland, in Nowa Sól County of Lubusz Voivodeship. As of December 2021, the town has a population of 4,191.

== History ==
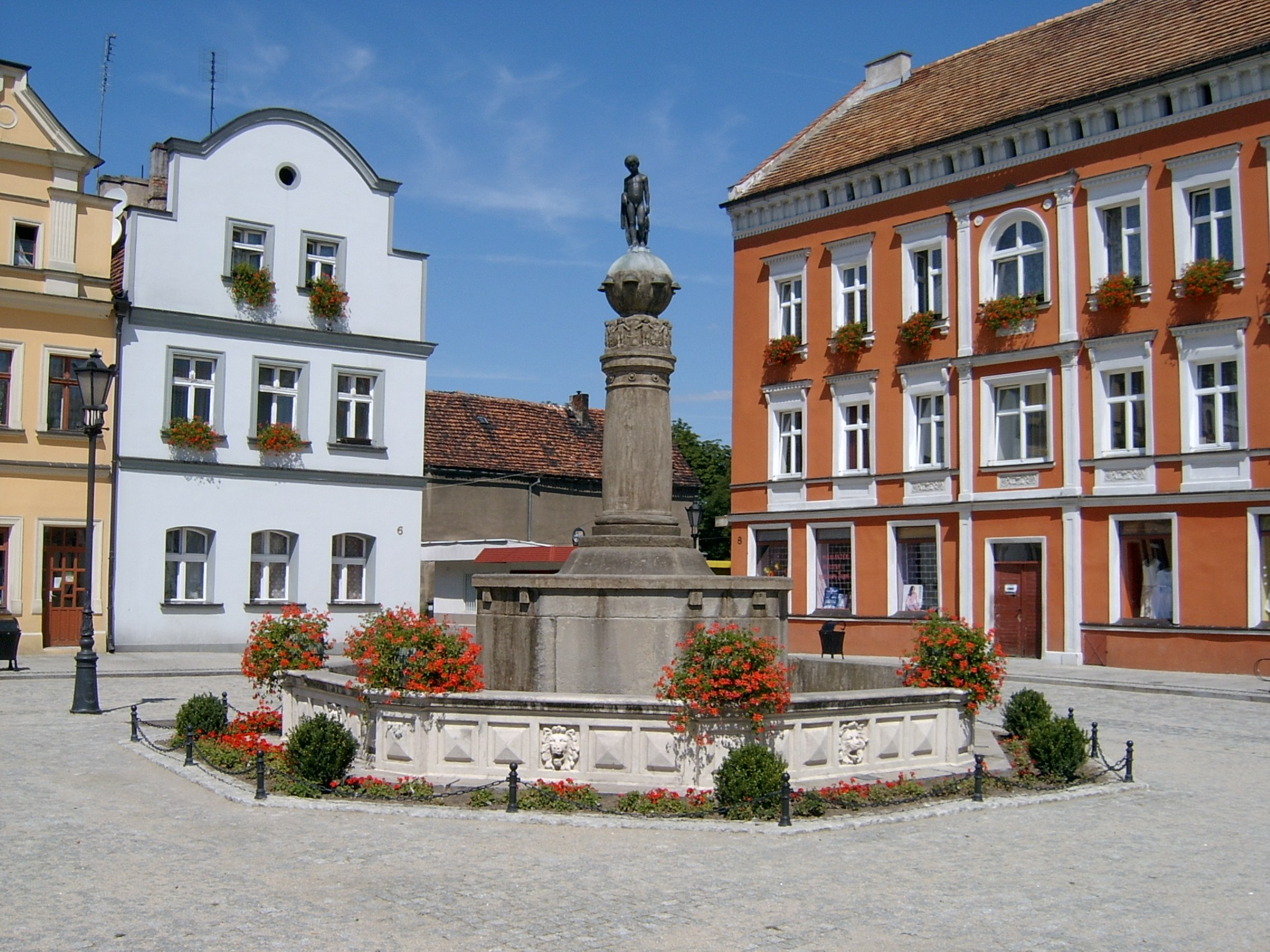
Rynek (Market Square)

Archaeological findings from the Stone Age and Bronze Age around Bytom suggest an early settlement. A Slavic gród is mentioned in 1005. It became part of the emerging Polish state in the 10th century. Bytom served as a defensive stronghold in case the more westerly defensive lines were breached during a possible German invasion from the west. During the invasion of Poland by Henry V, Polish ruler Bolesław III Wrymouth successfully defended the settlement in August 1109. The chronicles of Gallus Anonymus dedicate a lengthy passage concerning the battle, and praising the strong defense of the settlement and bravery of its defenders. This battle and Gall's praise is mentioned today on the main site of the town.

A medieval castellany is first mentioned in 1203 on a ford crossing the Oder, held by the Silesian Piasts. During inheritance conflict of Polish high duke Bolesław IV the Curly with the sons of his elder brother Władysław II the Exile and Emperor Frederick Barbarossa the town was abandoned by Polish troops, due to its state of neglect, and burned down to prevent enemy from using its food supplies as well as having a place to rest The parish church was a filial of the Cistercian Lubiąż Abbey and first documented in 1175. The settlement itself was granted German town law in 1263 and subsequently experienced arrival of immigrants during the Ostsiedlung. Bytom remained under the rule of the Piast dynasty until 1504. Then it was integrated with the Jagiellonian-ruled Bohemian (Czech) Kingdom, and after 1526, together with Bohemia, it came under the authority of the House of Habsburg.

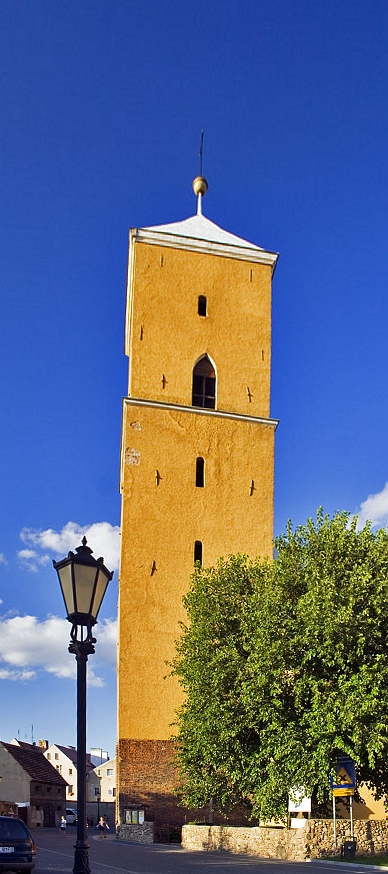
Saint Jerome church (Gothic)

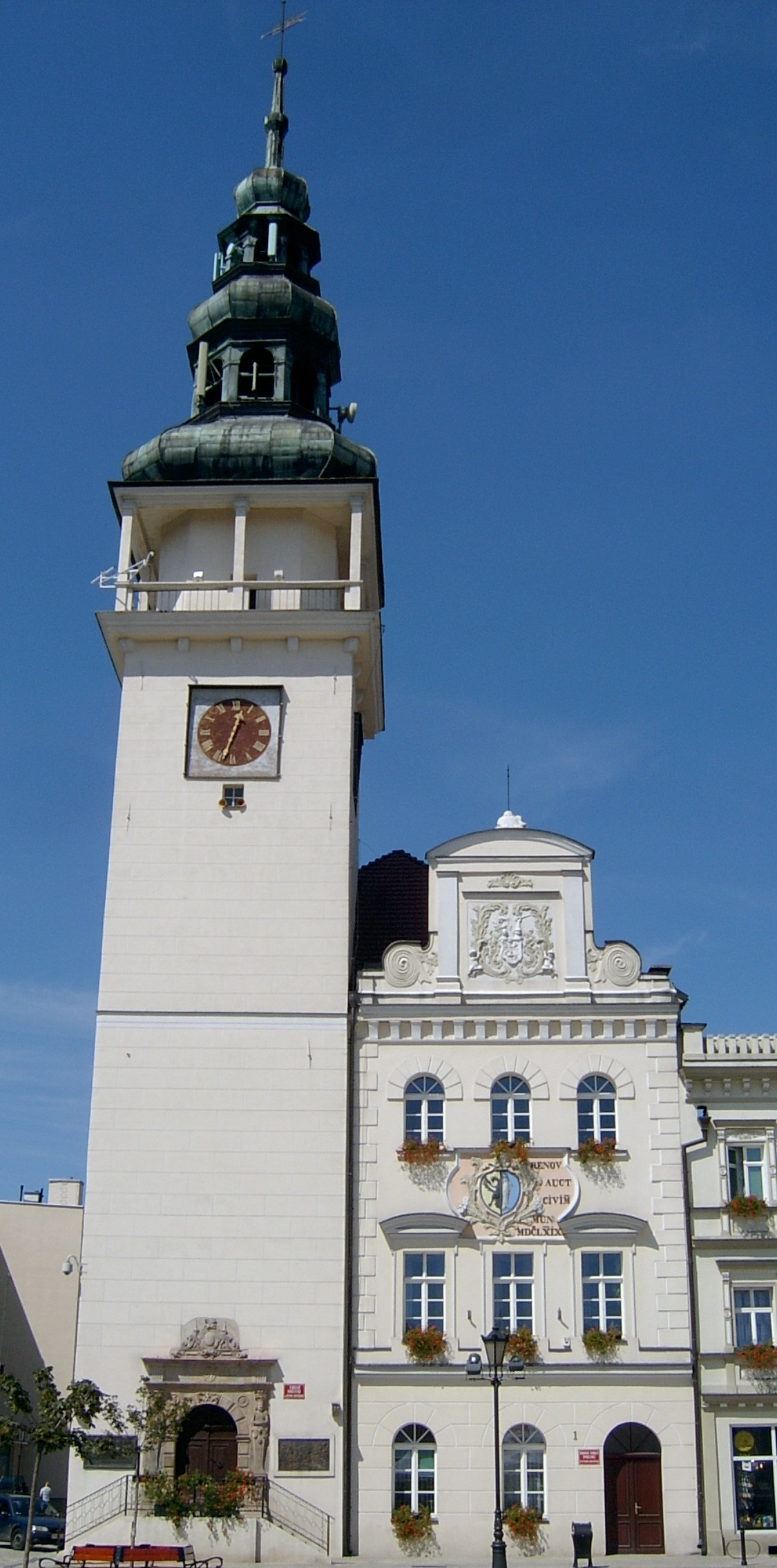
Town Hall (Renaissance)

In 1475 the town belonged to merchant Andreas Neumann (75%) and Georg von Glaubitz (25%). Johann von Rechenberg acquired both parts in 1524 and introduced the Protestant Reformation to the town. In 1540 the first Protestant pastor was appointed. In 1561 Franz von Rechenberg sold Beuthen to Fabian von Schoenaich. Von Schoenaich fought on the Catholic side in the Schmalkaldic War, but protected the Protestants in his domain. His cousin and successor Georg von Schoenaich made great contributions to the development of the town by the cultivation of the right bank of the Oder river, the planting of several fruits and grapes and the building of a new town hall (1602) and a bridge across the Oder. In 1618 a Protestant chapel was built, which was closed after the Thirty Years' War by imperial order in 1653. The biggest achievement by Georg von Schoenaich however was the establishment of a humanist Gymnasium academicum school in 1601. The school had 12 chairs, among them one for Protestant theology, for jurisprudence, medicine and – a novelty – morals. Between 1609 and 1613 a new school house was built. One of the gymnasiums students was Martin Opitz, who wrote his Aristarchus, sive De contemptu linguae Teutonicae there, which presented the German language as suitable for poetry. In 1628 the school however was already closed again by imperial order, since the gymnasium was considered Calvinistic.

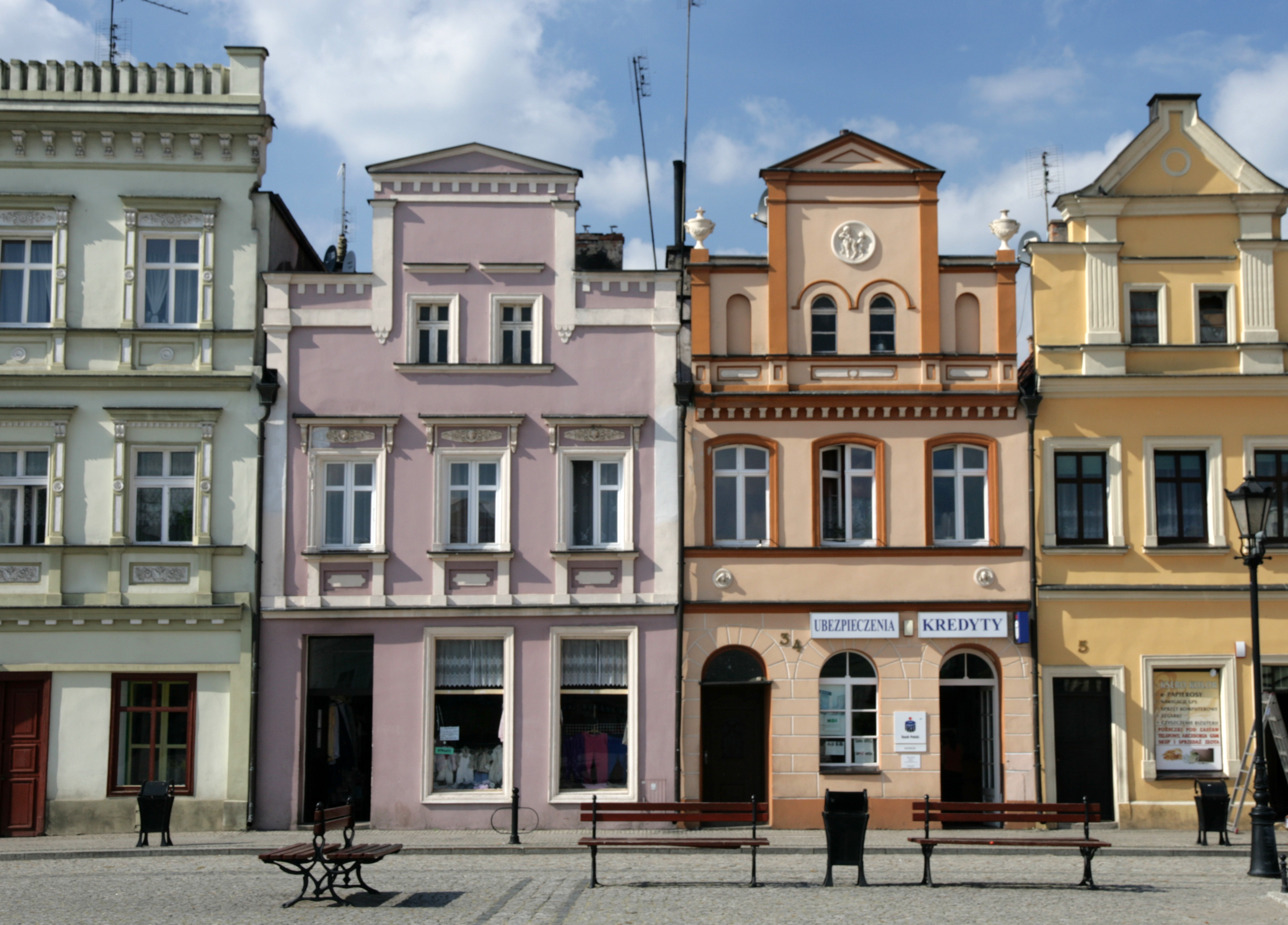
18th-century tenement houses

Beuthen was fortified in 1616 by fortress master Andreas Hindenberger. During the Thirty Years' War winter king Frederick V allegedly stayed overnight on his flight from Bohemia. After the occupation of the town by Liechtenstein dragoons Beuthen was recatholized by force in 1628. The Stephans church and the hospital were taken from the Protestants in 1653. A fire in 1694 destroyed parts of the town and the town hall, which was rebuilt in 1696.

The town was raised to the status of a state country by decree of Emperor Leopold I of Habsburg in 1697. After Frederick II of Prussia seized Silesia in the 1740s the Protestant school was opened again, and between 1744 and 1746 a Protestant church was built. Between 1766 and 1884 it was a garrison town. During the late 19th century brown coal mining became an important pillar of the local economy. The Prussian state railways opened a connection to Beuthen in 1871. From 1871 to 1945 it was part of Germany.

In 1945 around 40% of the town was destroyed, however, the central marketplace with many historical monuments, such as the iconic Town Hall, remained intact. Beuthen, along with the bulk of Lower Silesia, passed once again to Poland in accordance with the Potsdam Agreement. The town was renamed to Bytom Odrzański to distinguish it from Bytom in Upper Silesia, by adding the adjective Odrzański after the Oder river.

== Demographics ==
Historical population

Year	Pop.	±%
1843	3,706	—
1871	3,826	+3.2%
1880	3,703	−3.2%
1890	3,387	−8.5%
1900	3,164	−6.6%
1910	3,068	−3.0%

Year	Pop.	±%
1925	3,246	+5.8%
1939	3,176	−2.2%
1950	1,577	−50.3%
1960	2,380	+50.9%
2010	4,496	+88.9%

== Notable people ==
- Martin Opitz (1597–1639) attended the gymnasium at Bytom in 1617
- Jochen Klepper (1903–1942), journalist and writer

== Twin towns – sister cities ==
See twin towns of Gmina Bytom Odrzański.
