= Dobrzyń, Żary County =

Dobrzyń
- Village
- Location within Poland
- Coordinates: 51°25′40″N 14°58′38″E
- Country: Poland
- Voivodeship: Lubusz
- County: Żary
- Gmina: Przewóz

Dobrzyń ([ˈdɔbʐɨɲ]; German: Dobers) is a village in the administrative district of Gmina Przewóz, within Żary County, Lubusz Voivodeship, in western Poland, close to the German border.
