= Gmina Bytom Odrzański =

Gmina Bytom Odrzański Bytom Odrzański Commune
- Gmina
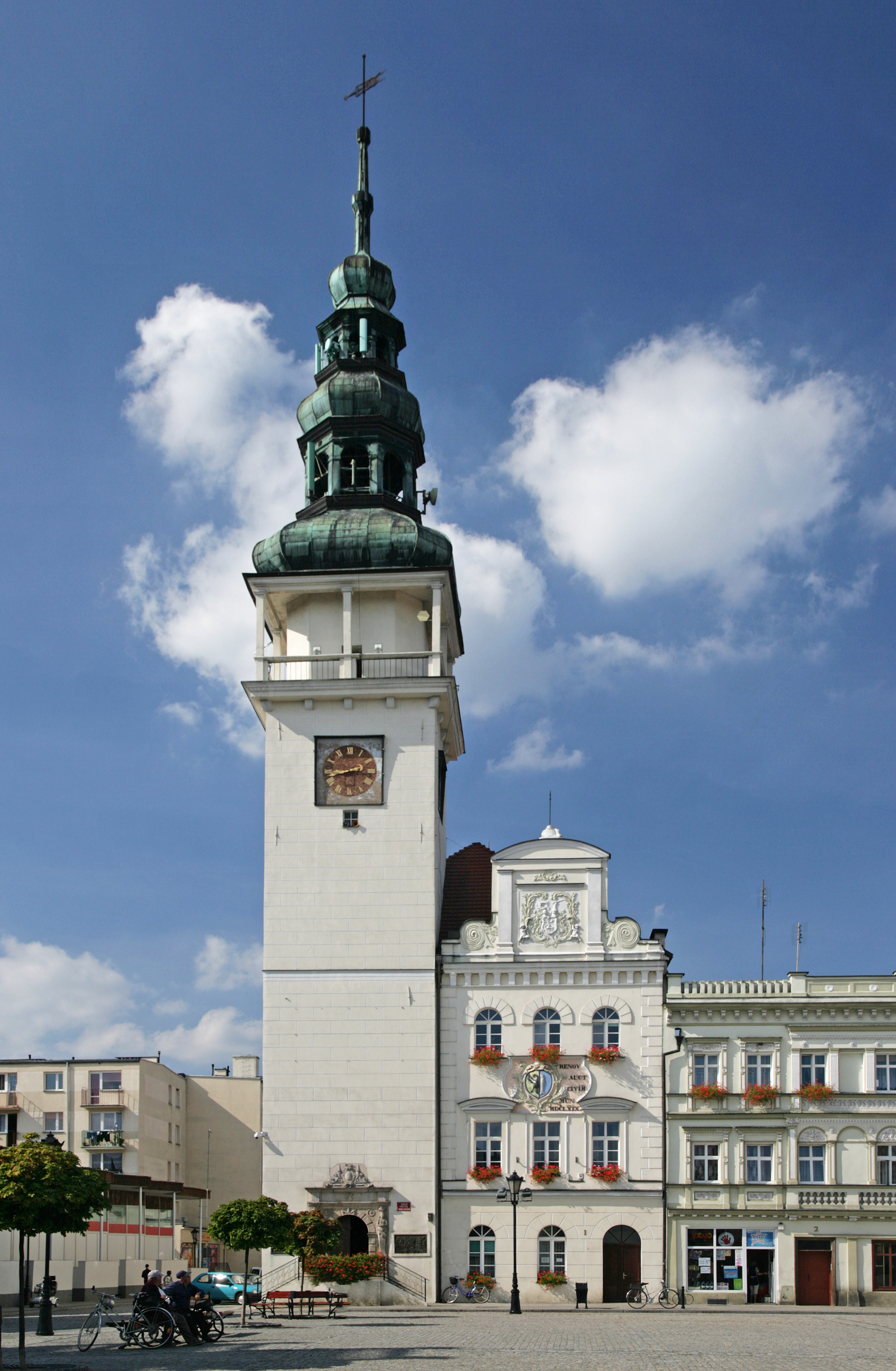
- Town Hall in Bytom Odrzański, seat of the gmina office

- Coat of arms
- Interactive map of Gmina Bytom Odrzański
- Coordinates (Bytom Odrzański): 51°44′N 15°49′E
- Country: Poland
- Voivodeship: Lubusz
- County: Nowa Sól
- Seat: Bytom Odrzański

Area
  - Total: 52.41 km^{2} (20.24 sq mi)

Population (2019-06-30)
  - Total: 5,424
  - Density: 103.5/km^{2} (268.0/sq mi)
  - Urban: 4,307
  - Rural: 1,117
- Time zone: UTC+1 (CET)
  - Summer (DST): UTC+2 (CEST)
- Vehicle registration: FNW
- Website: http://www.bytomodrzanski.pl

Gmina Bytom Odrzański is an urban-rural gmina (administrative district) in Nowa Sól County, Lubusz Voivodeship, in western Poland. Its seat is the town of Bytom Odrzański, which lies approximately 11 kilometres (7 mi) south-east of Nowa Sól and 32 km (20 mi) south-east of Zielona Góra.

The gmina covers an area of 52.41 square kilometres (20.2 sq mi), and as of 2019 its total population is 5,424.

== Villages ==
Apart from the town of Bytom Odrzański, Gmina Bytom Odrzański contains the villages and settlements of Bodzów, Bonów, Bycz, Drogomil, Królikowice, Kropiwnik, Małaszowice, Popowo, Sobolice, Tarnów Bycki and Wierzbnica.

== Neighbouring gminas ==
Gmina Bytom Odrzański is bordered by the gminas of Niegosławice, Nowa Sól, Nowe Miasteczko, Siedlisko and Żukowice.

== Twin towns – sister cities ==
Gmina Bytom Odrzański is twinned with:

- Pößneck, Germany
