= Lubartów, Lubusz Voivodeship =

Lubartów
- Village
- Location within Poland
- Coordinates: 51°30′21″N 15°1′58″E
- Country: Poland
- Voivodeship: Lubusz
- County: Żagań
- Gmina: Wymiarki
- Time zone: UTC+1 (CET)
  - Summer (DST): UTC+2 (CEST)
- Vehicle registration: FZG

Lubartów [luˈbartuf] is a village in the administrative district of Gmina Wymiarki, within Żagań County, Lubusz Voivodeship, in western Poland. It is located in the northern part of the Lower Silesian Forest.

== History ==
Since the Middle Ages, the area was at various times under the rule of Polish rulers of the Piast dynasty, Kings of Bohemia (Czechia), Electors and Kings of Saxony and Kings of Poland. In 1815, it was annexed by Prussia, and from 1871 it was also part of Germany, before it became again part of Poland following World War II in 1945.
