= Silno Małe =

- Village
- Location within Poland
- Coordinates: 51°31′16″N 15°2′24″E
- Country: Poland
- Voivodeship: Lubusz
- County: Żagań
- Gmina: Wymiarki

Silno Małe [ˈɕilnɔ ˈmawɛ] is a village in the administrative district of Gmina Wymiarki, within Żagań County, Lubusz Voivodeship, in western Poland.
