= Potok, Lubusz Voivodeship =

Potok
- Village
- Location within Poland
- Coordinates: 51°29′N 14°53′E
- Country: Poland
- Voivodeship: Lubusz
- County: Żary
- Gmina: Przewóz

Potok [ˈpɔtɔk] is a village in the administrative district of Gmina Przewóz, within Żary County, Lubusz Voivodeship, in western Poland, close to the German border.
