= Bucze =

Bucze may refer to the following places in Poland:

- Bucze, Lower Silesian Voivodeship (south-west Poland)
- Bucze, Lesser Poland Voivodeship (south Poland)
- Bucze, Świebodzin County in Lubusz Voivodeship (west Poland)
- Bucze, Żary County in Lubusz Voivodeship (west Poland)
- Bucze, West Pomeranian Voivodeship (north-west Poland)
