= Bycz, Lubusz Voivodeship =

Bycz
- Village
- Location within Poland
- Coordinates: 51°43′40″N 15°47′22″E
- Country: Poland
- Voivodeship: Lubusz
- County: Nowa Sól
- Gmina: Bytom Odrzański
- Population: 140

Bycz [bɨt͡ʂ] is a village in the administrative district of Gmina Bytom Odrzański, within Nowa Sól County, Lubusz Voivodeship, in western Poland.
