= Drogomil =

- Village
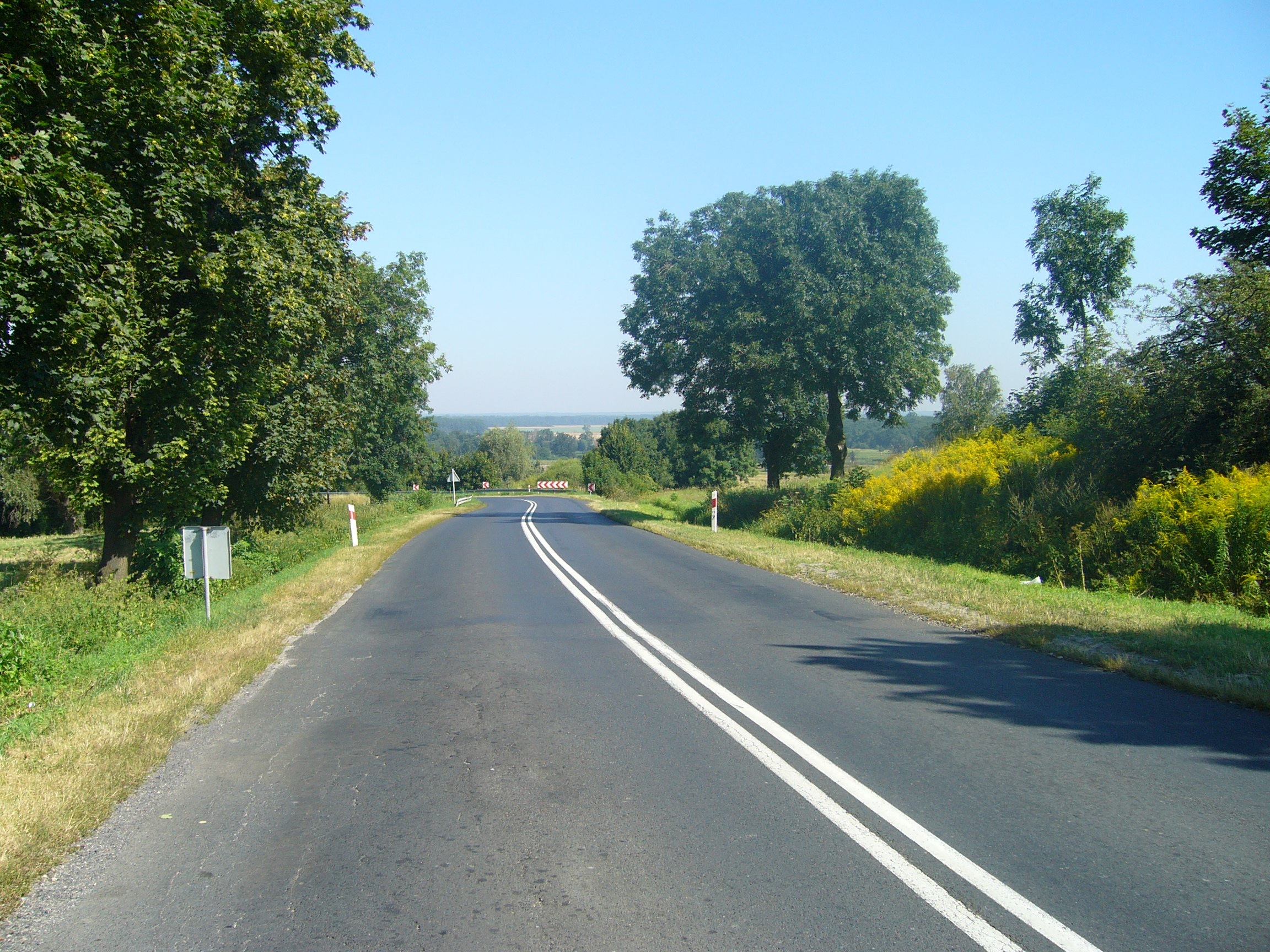

- Location within Poland
- Coordinates: 51°43′N 15°51′E
- Country: Poland
- Voivodeship: Lubusz
- County: Nowa Sól
- Gmina: Bytom Odrzański

Drogomil [drɔˈɡɔmil] is a village in the administrative district of Gmina Bytom Odrzański, within Nowa Sól County, Lubusz Voivodeship, in western Poland.
