= Lutynka =

- Village
- Location within Poland
- Coordinates: 51°33′N 15°3′E
- Country: Poland
- Voivodeship: Lubusz
- County: Żagań
- Gmina: Wymiarki

Lutynka [luˈtɨnka] is a village in the administrative district of Gmina Wymiarki, within Żagań County, Lubusz Voivodeship, in western Poland.
