= Stawnik =

- Village
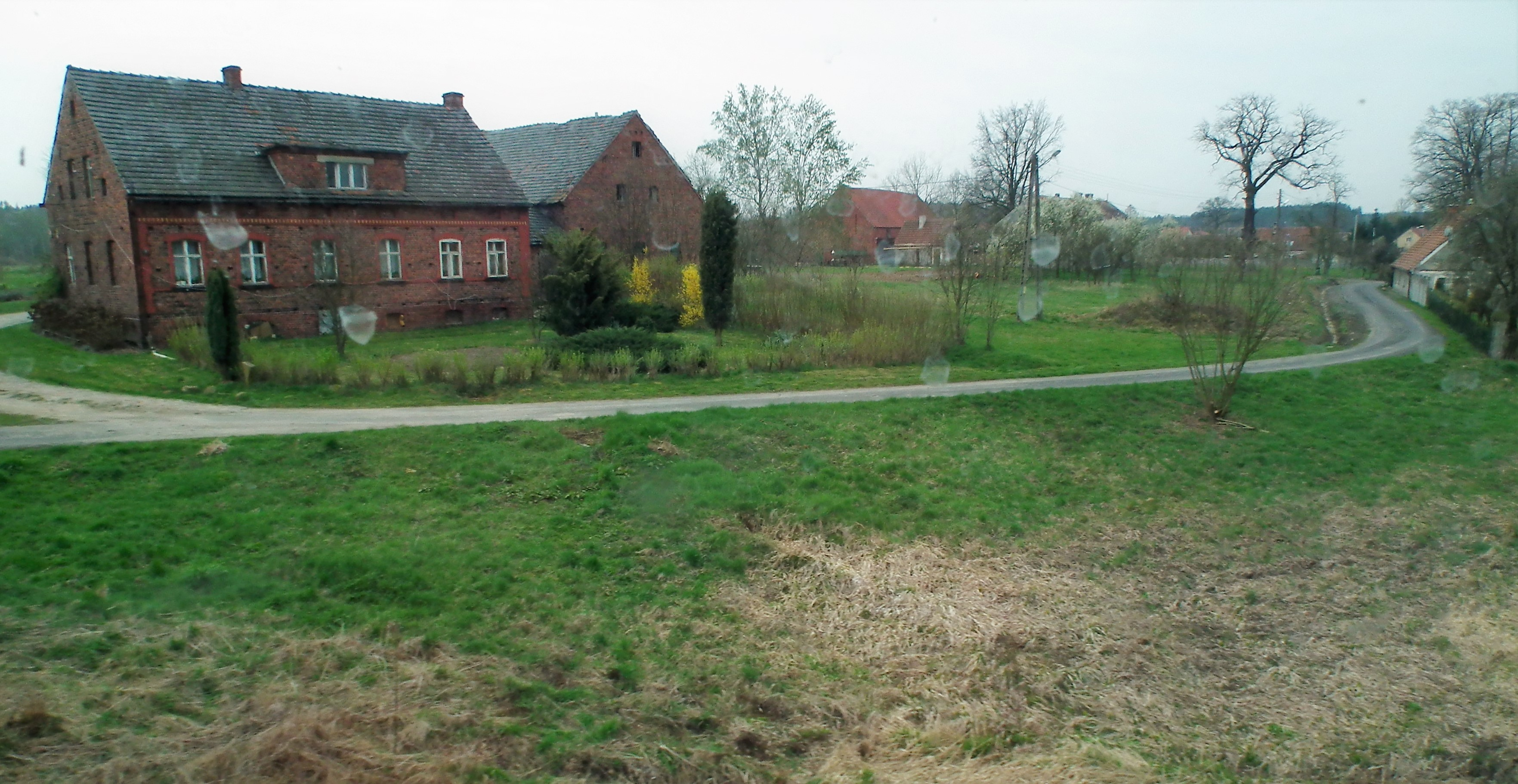

- Location within Poland
- Coordinates: 51°33′54″N 15°07′41″E
- Country: Poland
- Voivodeship: Lubusz
- County: Żary
- Gmina: Żary

Stawnik [ˈstavnik] is a village in the administrative district of Gmina Żary, within Żary County, Lubusz Voivodeship, in western Poland.

Until 1953, the village was served by Stawnik railway station.
