= Bodzów =

- Village
- Location within Poland
- Coordinates: 51°42′12″N 15°50′58″E
- Country: Poland
- Voivodeship: Lubusz
- County: Nowa Sól
- Gmina: Bytom Odrzański
- Population: 150

Bodzów [ˈbɔd͡zuf] is a village in the administrative district of Gmina Bytom Odrzański, within Nowa Sól County, Lubusz Voivodeship, in western Poland.
