= Gmina Wymiarki =

Gmina Wymiarki Wymiarki Commune
- Gmina
- Coat of arms
- Interactive map of Gmina Wymiarki
- Coordinates (Wymiarki): 51°30′44″N 15°5′0″E
- Country: Poland
- Voivodeship: Lubusz
- County: Żagań
- Seat: Wymiarki

Area
  - Total: 63.09 km^{2} (24.36 sq mi)

Population (2019-06-30)
  - Total: 2,288
  - Density: 36.27/km^{2} (93.93/sq mi)
- Website: http://www.wymiarki.pl

Gmina Wymiarki is a rural gmina (administrative district) in Żagań County, Lubusz Voivodeship, in western Poland. Its seat is the village of Wymiarki, which lies approximately 20 kilometres (12 mi) south-west of Żagań and 56 km (35 mi) south-west of Zielona Góra.

The gmina covers an area of 63.09 square kilometres (24.4 sq mi), and as of 2019 its total population is 2,288.

== Villages ==
Gmina Wymiarki contains the villages and settlements of Lubartów, Lubieszów, Lutynka, Silno Małe, Witoszyn and Wymiarki.

== Neighbouring gminas ==
Gmina Wymiarki is bordered by the gminas of Iłowa, Przewóz and Żary.

== Twin towns – sister cities ==
Gmina Wymiarki is twinned with:

- Kreba-Neudorf, Germany
