= Mielno, Żary County =

Mielno
- Village
- Location within Poland
- Coordinates: 51°32′45″N 14°59′30″E
- Country: Poland
- Voivodeship: Lubusz
- County: Żary
- Gmina: Przewóz

Mielno [ˈmjɛlnɔ] is a village in the administrative district of Gmina Przewóz, within Żary County, Lubusz Voivodeship, in western Poland, close to the German border.
