= Zbigniew Gut =

Polish footballer (1949–2010)

Personal information
- Date of birth: 17 April 1949
- Place of birth: Wymiarki, Poland
- Date of death: 27 March 2010 (aged 60)
- Place of death: Saint-Jean-de-Maurienne, France
- Height: 1.80 m (5 ft 11 in)
- Position: Defender

Youth career
- 1962–1966: Iskra Wymiarki

Senior career*
Years	Team	Apps	(Gls)
1966–1968	Promień Żary		
1968–1974	Odra Opole		
1974–1979	Lech Poznań	80	(0)
1980–1981	Paris FC		
1981–1982	Stade Français		
1982–1984	Red Star		
1985–1987	CA Maurienne		

International career
1972–1974	Poland	11	(0)
Medal record
Men's football
Representing Poland
FIFA World Cup
Third place	1974 West Germany
Olympic Games
Gold medal – first place	1972 Munich	Team
- * Club domestic league appearances and goals

Zbigniew Gut (Polish pronunciation: [ˈzbiɡɲɛv ˈɡut]; 17 April 1949 – 27 March 2010) was a Polish footballer who played as a defender. He represented Poland at the 1974 FIFA World Cup and the 1972 Summer Olympics. The club he was with for the longest part of his career was Odra Opole. His other clubs were Iskra Wymiarki, Promień Żary, Lech Poznań, Stade Français, Red Star FC and CA Maurienne.

== Honours ==
Poland

- Olympic gold medal: 1972
- FIFA World Cup third place: 1974

== Notes ==
- Player profile on the Polish Olympic Committee website
- Andrzej Gowarzewski : "Encyklopedia piłkarska FUJI – tom 16 Biało-czerwoni" ; wyd.GiA Katowice 1996
