= Dąbrowa Łużycka =

- Village
- Location within Poland
- Coordinates: 51°31′N 14°53′E
- Country: Poland
- Voivodeship: Lubusz
- County: Żary
- Gmina: Przewóz

Dąbrowa Łużycka [dɔmˈbrɔva wuˈʐɨt͡ska] (German: Dubrau) is a village in the administrative district of Gmina Przewóz, within Żary County, Lubusz Voivodeship, in western Poland, close to the German border.
