= Mirostowice Górne =

- Village
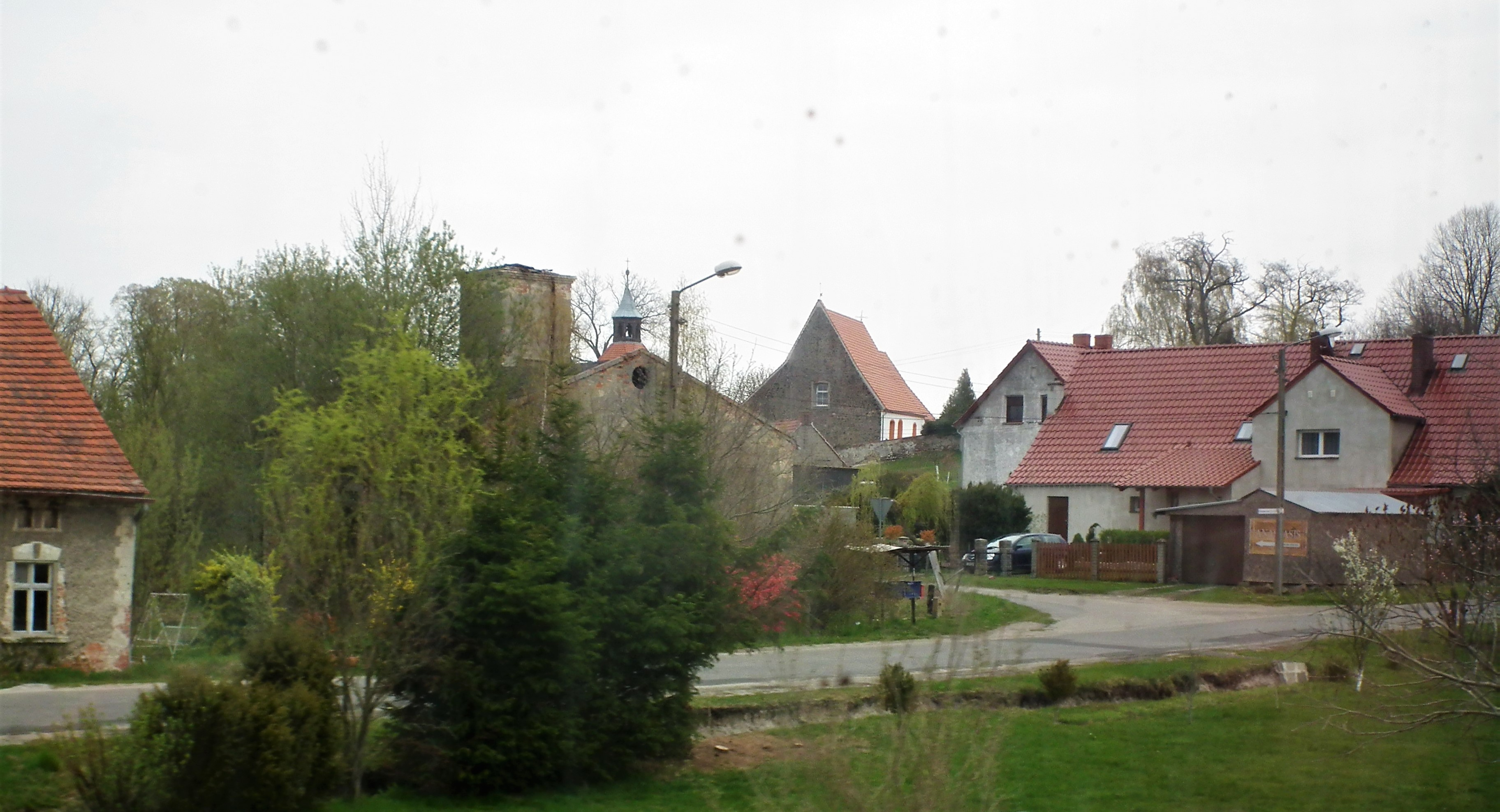

- Location within Poland
- Coordinates: 51°34′N 15°6′E
- Country: Poland
- Voivodeship: Lubusz
- County: Żary
- Gmina: Żary
- Elevation: 160 m (520 ft)
- Population: 445

Mirostowice Górne [mirɔstɔˈvit͡sɛ ˈɡurnɛ] is a village in the administrative district of Gmina Żary, within Żary County, Lubusz Voivodeship, in western Poland.

Until 1985, the village was served by Mirostowice Górne railway station.
