= Mała Lipna =

- Village
- Location within Poland
- Coordinates: 51°24′25″N 15°00′42″E
- Country: Poland
- Voivodeship: Lubusz
- County: Żary
- Gmina: Przewóz

Mała Lipna [ˈmawa ˈlipna] is a village in the administrative district of Gmina Przewóz, within Żary County, Lubusz Voivodeship, in western Poland, close to the German border.
