= Witoszyn, Lubusz Voivodeship =

Witoszyn
- Village
- Location within Poland
- Coordinates: 51°31′N 15°6′E
- Country: Poland
- Voivodeship: Lubusz
- County: Żagań
- Gmina: Wymiarki

Witoszyn [viˈtɔʂɨn] is a village in the administrative district of Gmina Wymiarki, within Żagań County, Lubusz Voivodeship, in western Poland.
