= Gmina Przewóz =

Gmina Przewóz Przewóz Commune
- Gmina
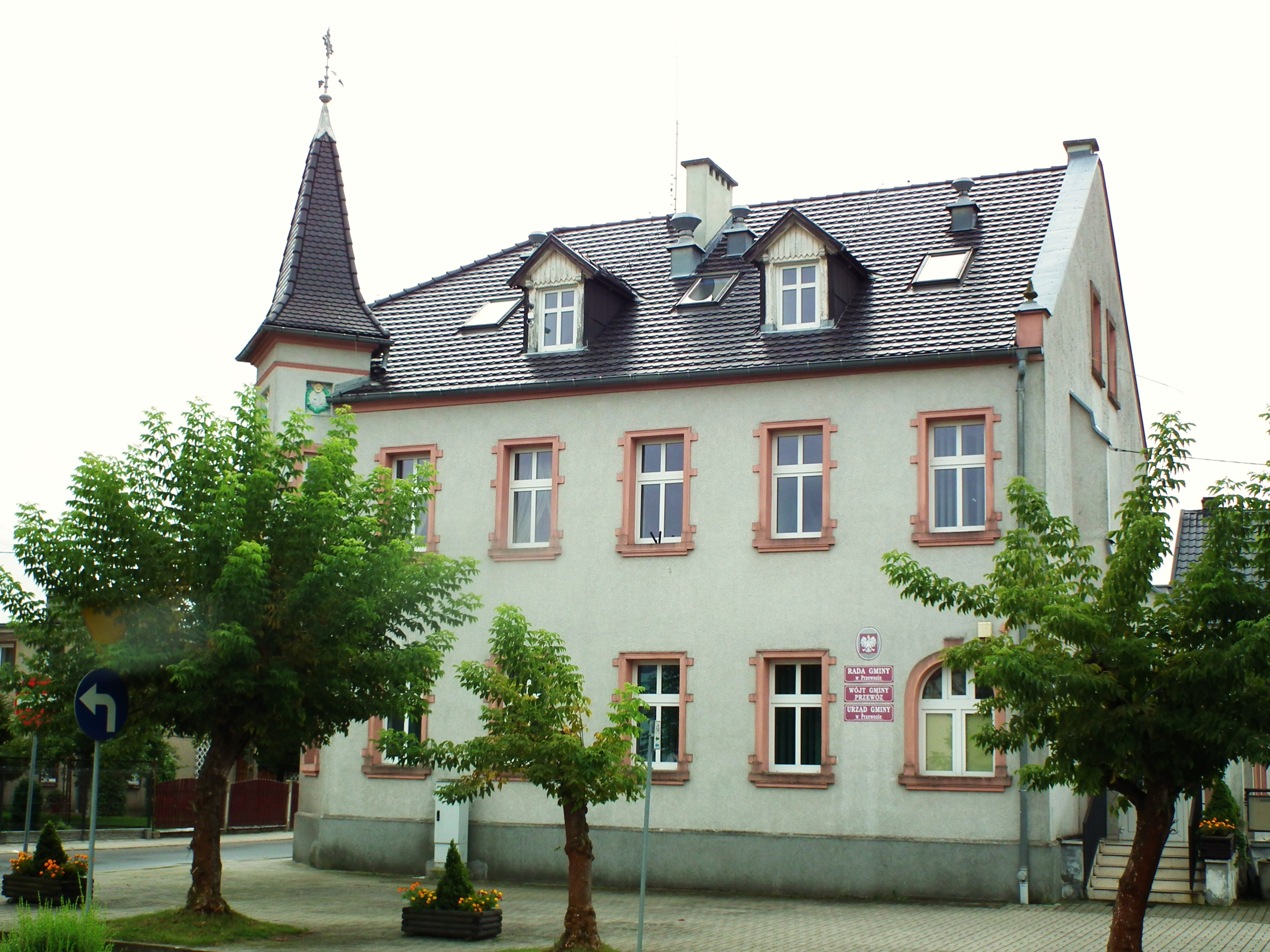
- Gmina office in Przewóz

- Coat of arms
- Interactive map of Gmina Przewóz
- Coordinates (Przewóz): 51°28′40″N 14°57′0″E
- Country: Poland
- Voivodeship: Lubusz
- County: Żary
- Seat: Przewóz

Area
  - Total: 178.32 km^{2} (68.85 sq mi)

Population (2019-06-30)
  - Total: 3,157
  - Density: 17.70/km^{2} (45.85/sq mi)
- Time zone: UTC+1 (CET)
  - Summer (DST): UTC+2 (CEST)
- Vehicle registration: FZA
- Website: http://www.przewoz.com.pl/

Gmina Przewóz is a rural gmina (administrative district) in Żary County, Lubusz Voivodeship, in western Poland, on the German border. Its seat is the village of Przewóz, which lies approximately 22 kilometres (14 mi) south-west of Żary and 64 km (40 mi) south-west of Zielona Góra.

The gmina covers an area of 178.32 square kilometres (68.8 sq mi), and as of 2019 its total population is 3,157.

The gmina contains part of the protected area called Muskau Bend Landscape Park.

== Villages ==
Gmina Przewóz contains the villages and settlements of Bucze, Dąbrowa Łużycka, Dobrochów, Dobrzyń, Jamno, Lipna, Mała Lipna, Mielno, Piotrów, Potok, Przewóz, Sanice, Sobolice, Straszów and Włochów.

== History ==
In 1008, Bolesław I the Brave annexed Lusatia to Poland. In the second half of the 13th century, Przewóz was in the Duchy of Żagań, from 1303 to 1319 it was owned by the House of Ascania from Brandenburg, then under Polish rule within the borders of Lower Silesia as part of the duchies of Jawor and Żagań. In the years 1311–1945 it had city rights.

== Neighbouring gminas ==
Gmina Przewóz is bordered by the town of Łęknica and by the gminas of Lipinki Łużyckie, Pieńsk, Trzebiel, Węgliniec, Wymiarki and Żary. It also borders Germany.
