= Królikowice, Lubusz Voivodeship =

Królikowice
- Village
- Location within Poland
- Coordinates: 51°42′49″N 15°45′25″E
- Country: Poland
- Voivodeship: Lubusz
- County: Nowa Sól
- Gmina: Bytom Odrzański
- Population: 100

Królikowice [krulikɔˈvit͡sɛ] is a village in the administrative district of Gmina Bytom Odrzański, within Nowa Sól County, Lubusz Voivodeship, in western Poland.
