= Lipna, Lubusz Voivodeship =

Lipna
- Village
- Location within Poland
- Coordinates: 51°26′0″N 15°1′10″E
- Country: Poland
- Voivodeship: Lubusz
- County: Żary
- Gmina: Przewóz

Lipna (Polish: [ˈlipna]; German: Leippa, from 1936–1945 Selingersruh) is a village in the administrative district of Gmina Przewóz, within Żary County, Lubusz Voivodeship, in western Poland, close to the German border.

== History ==
The village, of Slavic origin, was first recorded in 1417 as Leippe. In the following centuries, it was owned by the Haugwitz, Kottwitz, Callenberg, and Kiesenwetter families. Lipna was once home to glass and faience production.

From 1908 until 1981, Lipa Łużycka railway station served the village.
