= Straszów, Lubusz Voivodeship =

Straszów
- Village
- Location within Poland
- Coordinates: 51°31′8″N 14°49′23″E
- Country: Poland
- Voivodeship: Lubusz
- County: Żary
- Gmina: Przewóz

Straszów [ˈstraʂuf] is a village in the administrative district of Gmina Przewóz, within Żary County, Lubusz Voivodeship, in western Poland, close to the German border.
