= Wierzbnica, Lubusz Voivodeship =

Wierzbnica
- Village
- Location within Poland
- Coordinates: 51°42′8″N 15°48′47″E
- Country: Poland
- Voivodeship: Lubusz
- County: Nowa Sól
- Gmina: Bytom Odrzański

Wierzbnica [vjɛʐbˈnit͡sa] (German: Würbitz) is a village in the administrative district of Gmina Bytom Odrzański, within Nowa Sól County, Lubusz Voivodeship, in western Poland.
