= Sobolice, Nowa Sól County =

Sobolice
- Village
- Location within Poland
- Coordinates: 51°41′N 15°51′E
- Country: Poland
- Voivodeship: Lubusz
- County: Nowa Sól
- Gmina: Bytom Odrzański

Sobolice [sɔbɔˈlit͡sɛ] is a village in the administrative district of Gmina Bytom Odrzański, within Nowa Sól County, Lubusz Voivodeship, in western Poland.
