= Sanice =

- Village
- Location within Poland
- Coordinates: 51°25′N 14°59′E
- Country: Poland
- Voivodeship: Lubusz
- County: Żary
- Gmina: Przewóz
- Population (2021): 202
- Postal code: 68-132
- Area code: +48 68
- Vehicle registration: FZA

Sanice [saˈnit͡sɛ] (German: Sänitz; Upper Sorbian: Senica) is a village in the administrative district of Gmina Przewóz, within Żary County, Lubusz Voivodeship, in western Poland, close to the German border.

From 1975 to 1998, the village was in the Zielona Góra Voivodeship.
