= Sobolice, Żary County =

Sobolice
- Village
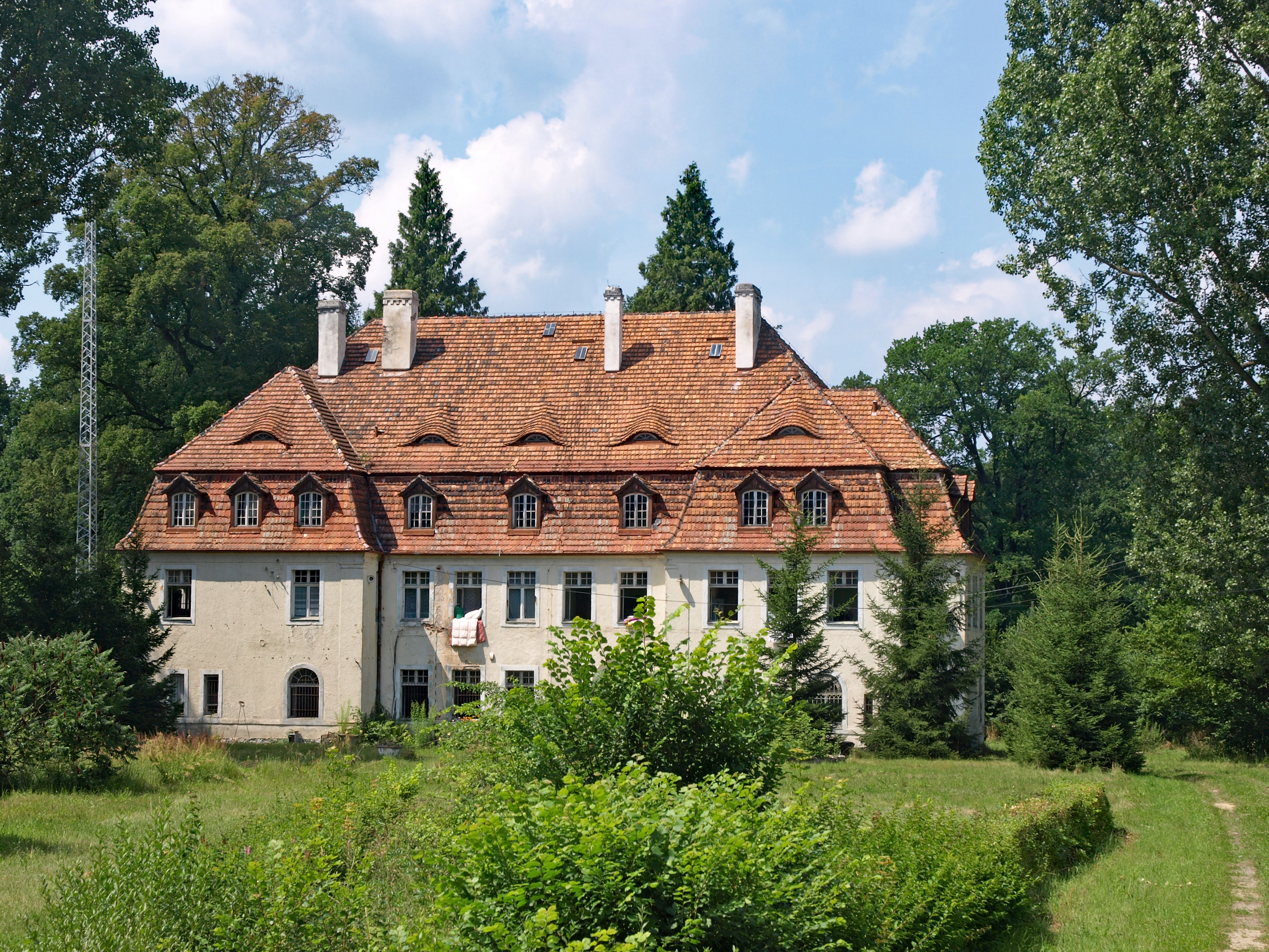
- Palace of Sobolice

- Location within Poland
- Coordinates: 51°23′20″N 14°58′20″E
- Country: Poland
- Voivodeship: Lubusz
- County: Żary
- Gmina: Przewóz
- Population (2021): 77

Sobolice ([sɔbɔˈlit͡sɛ]) (German: Zoblitz; Upper Sorbian: Sobolkecy) is a village in the administrative district of Gmina Przewóz, within Żary County, Lubusz Voivodeship, in western Poland, close to the German border.

== History ==
The village was first mentioned as Zebulusk in 1345, and later as Czobolesk in 1399, were the village was inhabited by Sorbs until the 17th century. The village was owned by the Penzig family, until between 1491-1492, Hans von Penzig sold the property rights to this village to the city of Görlitz.

A paper factory was built in the 19th century, which was later rebuilt expanded in 1906. The village had a population of around 230 people when it was merged with Lodenau to form Zoblitz-Lodenau on 1 April 1938.

After World War II, the area became under Polish Administration due to the Potsdam Agreement. The village was renamed to Sobolice. The Polish Border Guard was stationed here until 2005.
