= Lubieszów, Żagań County =

Lubieszów
- Village
- Location within Poland
- Coordinates: 51°32′N 15°9′E
- Country: Poland
- Voivodeship: Lubusz
- County: Żagań
- Gmina: Wymiarki
- Population (approx.): 230

Lubieszów [luˈbjɛʂuf] is a village in the administrative district of Gmina Wymiarki, within Żagań County, Lubusz Voivodeship, in western Poland.
