= Mirostowice Dolne =

- Village
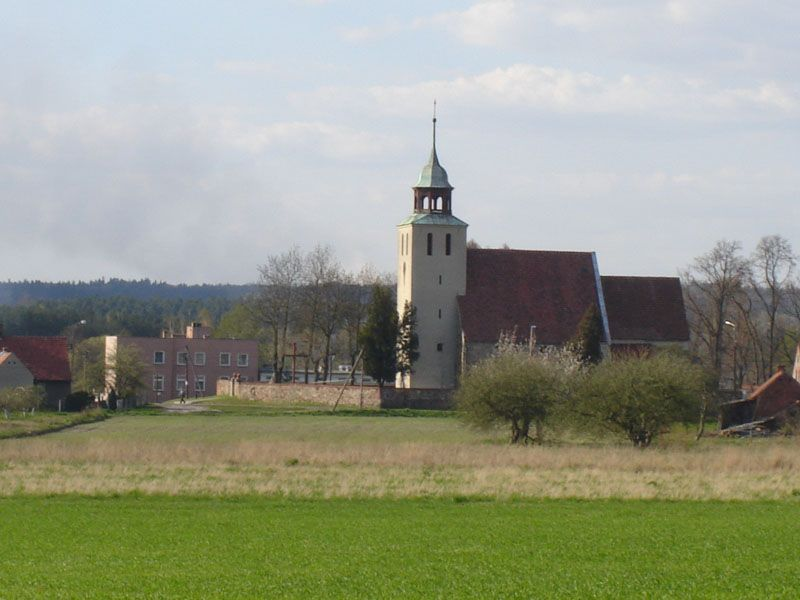

- Location within Poland
- Coordinates: 51°34′N 15°9′E
- Country: Poland
- Voivodeship: Lubusz
- County: Żary
- Gmina: Żary
- Population: 2,800

Mirostowice Dolne [mirɔstɔˈvit͡sɛ ˈdɔlnɛ] is a village in the administrative district of Gmina Żary, within Żary County, Lubusz Voivodeship, in western Poland.

Until 1984, the village was served by Mirostowice Dolne railway station.
