= Bucze, Żary County =

Bucze
- Village
- Location within Poland
- Coordinates: 51°27′N 14°57′E
- Country: Poland
- Voivodeship: Lubusz
- County: Żary
- Gmina: Przewóz
- Population: 100

Bucze ([ˈbut͡ʂɛ]) is a village in the administrative district of Gmina Przewóz, within Żary County, Lubusz Voivodeship, in western Poland, close to the German border.
