= Wymiarki, Lubusz Voivodeship =

Wymiarki
- Village
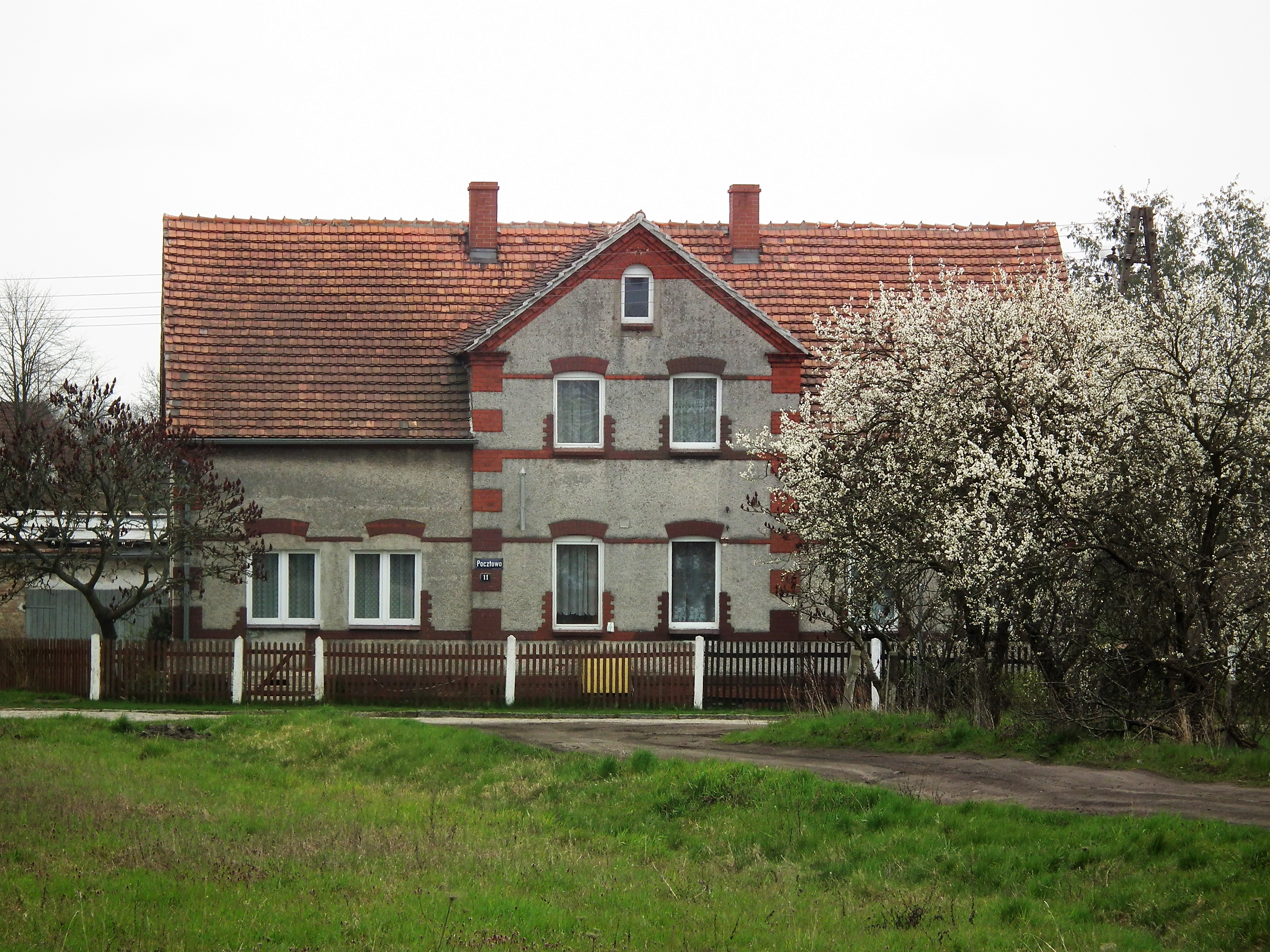
- House in Wymiarki

- Location within Poland
- Coordinates: 51°30′N 15°5′E
- Country: Poland
- Voivodeship: Lubusz
- County: Żagań
- Gmina: Wymiarki
- Population (2021): 1,043
- Postal code: 68-131
- Vehicle registration: FZG

Wymiarki ([vɨˈmjarki]) (German: Wiesau) is a village in Żagań County, Lubusz Voivodeship, in western Poland. It is the seat of the gmina (administrative district) called Gmina Wymiarki. It liesapproximately 21 km (13 mi) south-west of Żagań and 57 km (35 mi) south-west of Zielona Góra.

From 1975 to 1998, the village was in the Zielona Góra Voivodeship.

Historical population
Year	Pop.	±%
1787	279	—
1939	1,172	+320.1%
2009	1,239	+5.7%
2011	1,220	−1.5%
2021	1,043	−14.5%

== Notable residents ==
- Zbigniew Gut (1949–2010), footballer
