= Sanice railway station =

Former railway station in Sanice, Poland

Sanice

General information
- Location: Sanice, Lubusz Voivodeship; Poland
- Coordinates: 51°24′58″N 14°58′25″E
- Owner: Polish State Railways
- Line: Jankowa Żagańska–Sanice railway

History
- Opened: 17 August 1908
- Closed: 31 May 1981
- Former names: Sänitz (1908–1945); Sanica (1945–1947)
Location
- Location within Poland

Sanice was a railway station on the Jankowa Żagańska–Sanice railway in the village of Sanice, Żary County, within the Lubusz Voivodeship in western Poland.

== History ==
The station opened as Sänitz on 17 August 1908. After World War II, the area came under Polish administration. As a result, the station was taken over by Polish State Railways, and was renamed Sanica, and later to its modern name, Sanice, in 1947.

Passenger services were withdrawn from Sanice on 31 May 1981. Freight trains were withdrawn in 1984.

== Former services ==
Preceding station	Disused railways	Following station
Lipa Łużycka towards Jankowa Żagańska	Polish State Railways; Jankowa Żagańska–Sanice	Terminus
