= Jankowa Żagańska railway station =

Railway junction station in south-western Poland

Jankowa Żagańska
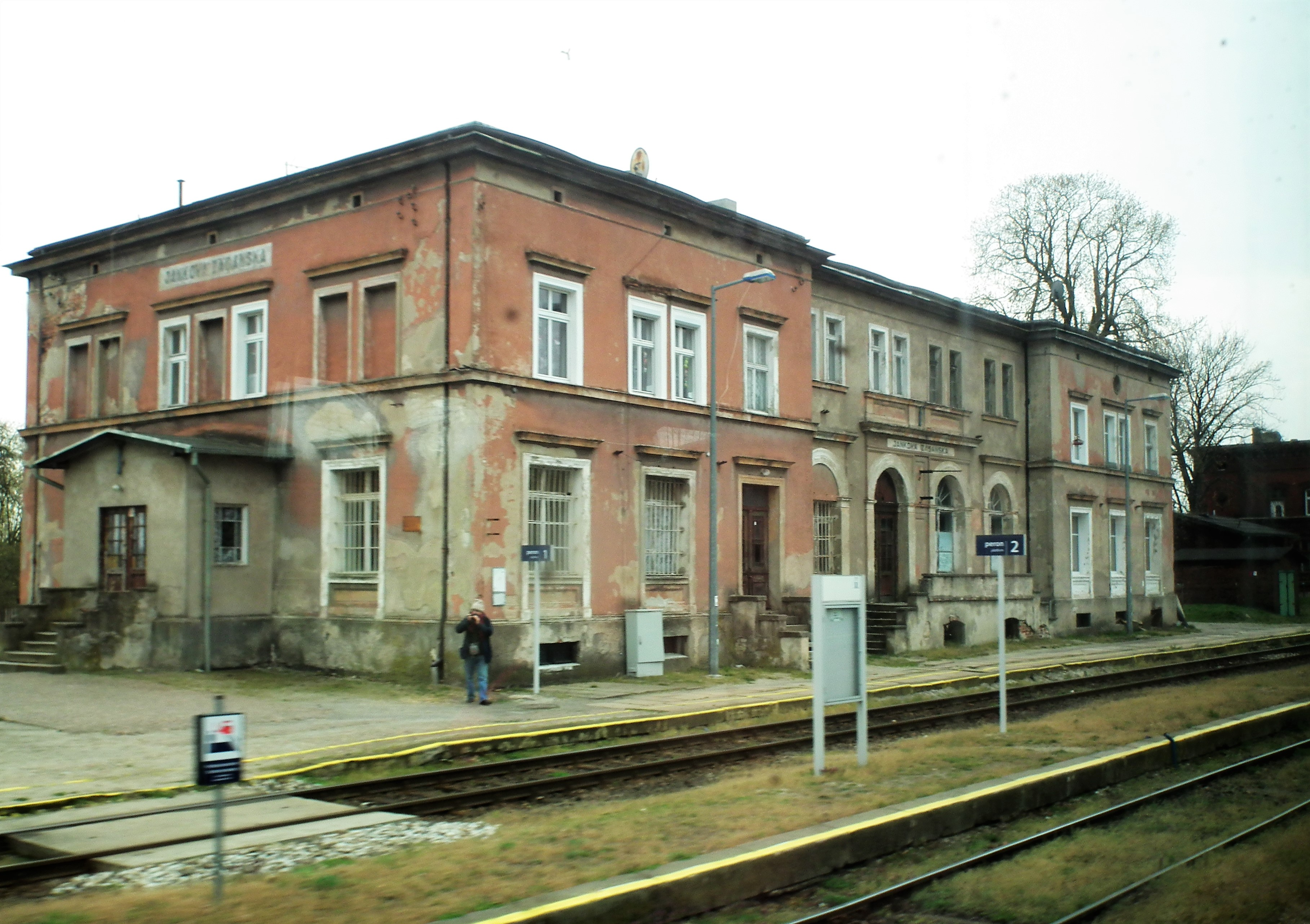
- Station building

General information
- Location: Konin Żagański, Lubusz Voivodeship; Poland
- Coordinates: 51°33′58.0″N 15°10′52.0″E
- Owner: Polish State Railways
- Lines: Miłkowice–Jasień railway; Jankowa Żagańska–Przewóz railway (freight only); Jankowa Żagańska–Żagań railway
- Platforms: 4

History
- Opened: 1 September 1846
- Former names: Hansdorf (1846–1926); Hansdorf (Kreis Sagan) (1926–1933); Hansdorf (Niederschlesien) (1933–1945); Łukowice (1945–1947)

Services
Preceding station	Polregio	Following station
Konin Żagański towards Görlitz	PR	Żary Kunice towards Zielona Góra Główna
Location
- Location within Poland

Konin Żagański is a railway station in the village of Jankowa Żagańska, Żagań County, within the Lubusz Voivodeship in south-western Poland.

== Railway geography ==
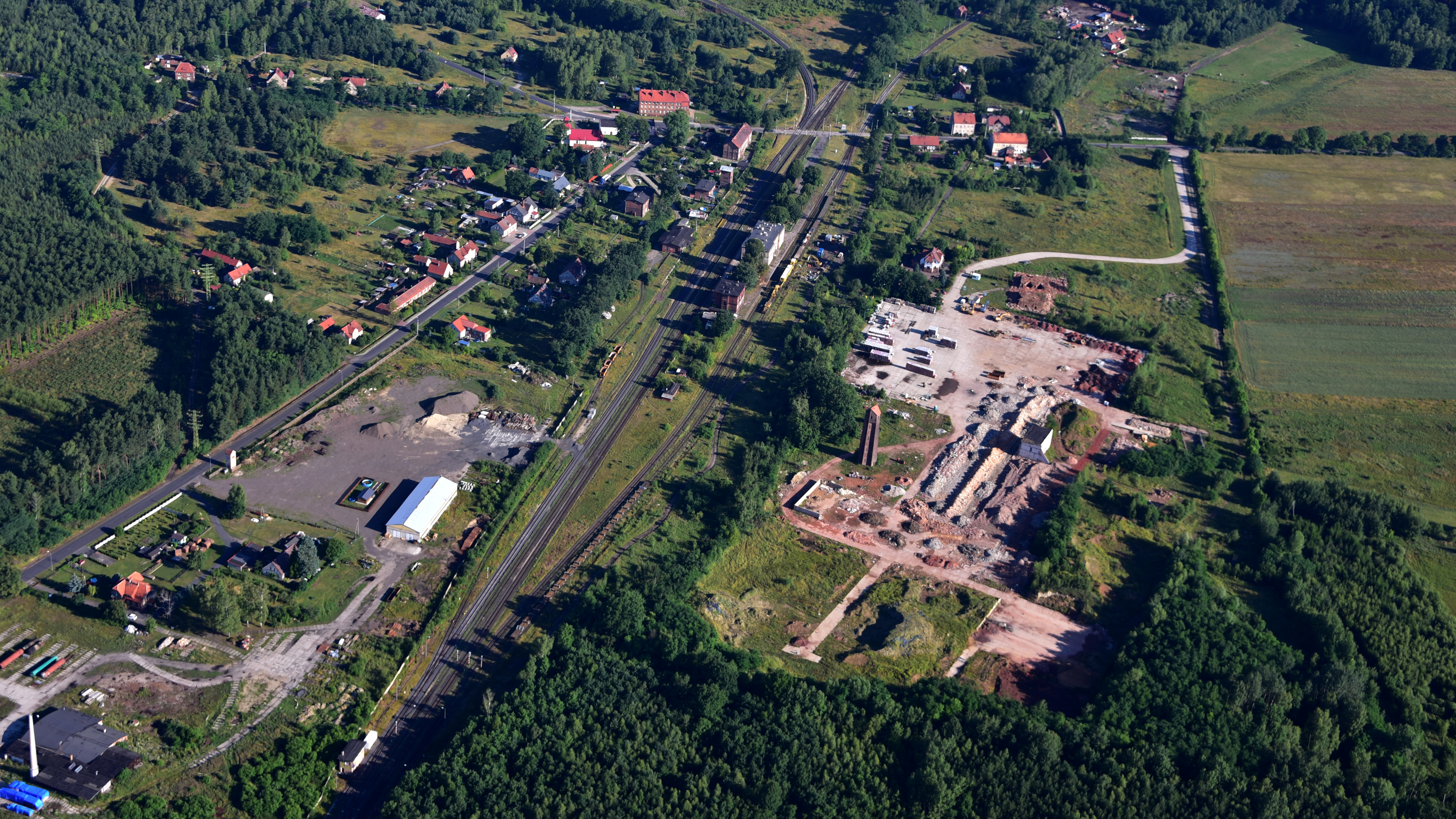
Aerial view of the station

Three railway lines pass through the station, however, only one of them, the Miłkowice–Jasień railway, is served by passenger trains. The line runs directly north from the station towards Żary.

The Jankowa Żagańska–Sanice railway branches off north-west of the station towards Mirostowice Dolne. The Jankowa Żagańska–Żagań railway branches off north-east of the station towards Żagań. The two lines are only used by freight trains, and occasionally, tourist trains, mostly on the Jankowa Żagańska–Sanice railway.

== History ==
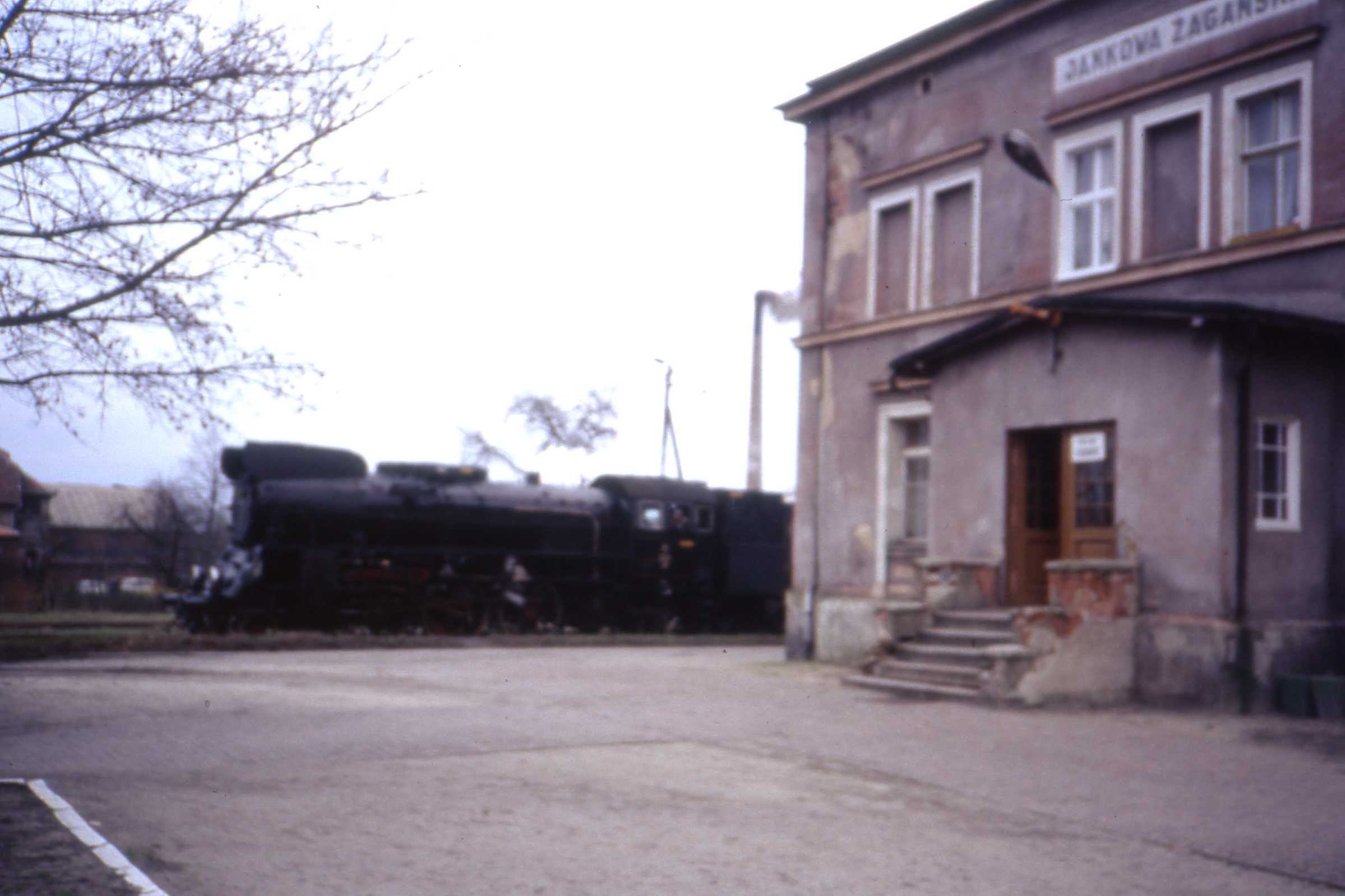
PKP steam locomotive at the station in November 1989

The station opened on 1 September 1846 as Hansdorf, the railway junction in the Szprotawa region. The station was renamed to Hansdorf (Kreis Sagan) in 1926, and renamed once again to Hansdorf (Niederschlesien) in 1933.

In Spring 1945 of World War II, the station served as a quartermaster unloading bay of the Second Polish Army, mainly during the Lusatian Operation. The military equipment delivered here was transported via truck to the front lines or the other base at Ruszów railway station.

After World War II, the area came under Polish administration. As a result, the station was taken over by Polish State Railways, and was renamed to Łukowice. It was renamed once again, to its modern name, Jankowa Żagańska, in 1947.

Sidings once branched off to a local brickyard, these tracks are now dismantled. Until the 1990s, a short line existed north of the station allowing trains to depart from the Żagań section towards Żary.

== Train services ==
The station is served by the following service(s):

- Regional services (R) Görlitz - Żary - Zielona Góra
