= 1945 territorial changes of Poland =

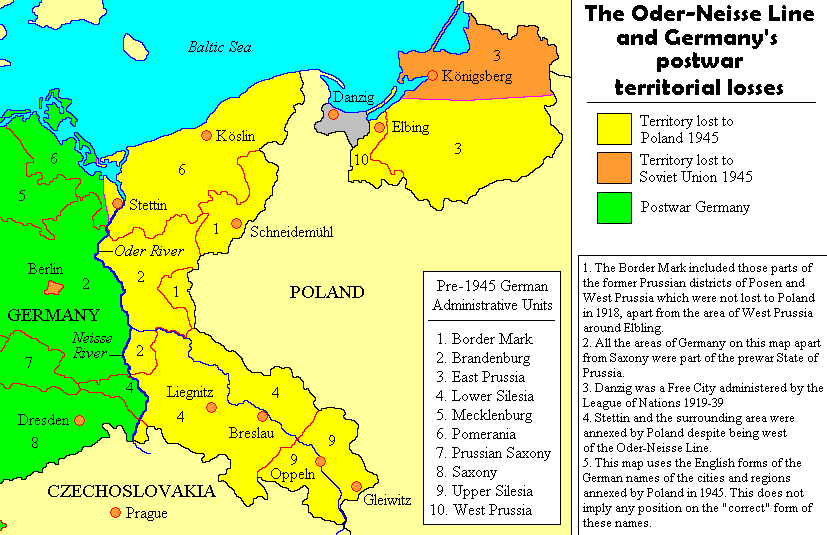
The Oder–Neisse line

Poland's old and new borders, 1945

At the end of World War II, Poland underwent major changes to the location of its international border. In 1945, after the defeat of Nazi Germany, the Oder–Neisse line became its western border, resulting in gaining the Recovered Territories from Germany. The Curzon Line became its eastern border, resulting in the loss of the Eastern Borderlands to the Soviet Union.

== Decision ==
These decisions were in accordance with the decisions made first by the Allies at the Tehran Conference of 1943 where the Soviet Union demanded the recognition of the line proposed by British Foreign Secretary Lord Curzon in 1920.

The same Soviet stance was repeated by Joseph Stalin at the Yalta Conference with Franklin D. Roosevelt and Winston Churchill in February 1945, but much more forcefully in the face of the looming German defeat. The new borders were ratified at the Potsdam Conference of August 1945 exactly as proposed by Stalin who already controlled the whole of East-Central Europe. Harry Truman remembered:

I remember at Potsdam, we got to discussing a matter in eastern Poland, and it was remarked by the Prime Minister of Great Britain that the Pope would not be happy over the arrangement of that Catholic end of Poland. And the Generalissimo, the Prime Minister of Russia leaned on the table, and he pulled his mustache like that, and looked over to Mr. Churchill and said: Mr. Churchill, Mr. Prime Minister, how many divisions did you say the Pope had?

Large territories of what was the Second Polish Republic were ceded to the Soviet Union by the Moscow-backed Polish government, and today form part of Lithuania, Belarus and Ukraine. Poland was instead given the Free State of Danzig and the German areas east of the rivers Oder and Neisse (see Recovered Territories), pending a final peace conference with Germany. Since a peace conference never took place, the lands were effectively ceded by Germany.

== Population transfer ==
The population transfer of both Polish and Germans 1945–46 included many millions of people. The Polish territory in 1919–39 covered an area of 386,418 square kilometres (149,197 square miles). But from 1947, Poland's territory was reduced to 312,679 square kilometres (120,726 square miles), so the country lost 73,739 square kilometres (28,471 square miles) of land. This difference amounts almost to the size of the Czech Republic, although Poland ended up with a much longer coastline on the Baltic Sea compared to its 1939 borders.

== Outcome ==
The prewar eastern Polish territories of Kresy, which the Red Army had overrun during the Nazi-Soviet invasion of Poland in 1939 (excluding the Białystok region) were permanently ceded to the USSR by the new Polish communist government, and most of their Polish inhabitants expelled. As a result of the Potsdam Agreement to which Poland's government-in-exile was not invited, Poland lost 179,000 square kilometres (69,000 square miles) (45%) of prewar territories in the east, including over 12 million citizens of whom 4.3 million were Polish-speakers. Today, these territories are part of sovereign Belarus, Ukraine, and Lithuania.

In turn, postwar Poland was assigned considerably smaller territories to the west including the prewar Free City of Danzig and the former territory of Germany east of the Oder–Neisse line, consisting of the southern portion of East Prussia and most of Pomerania, Neumark (East Brandenburg), and German Silesia. Poland also received the town of Swinemünde (now Świnoujście) on the island of Usedom and the city of Stettin (now Szczecin) on the western bank of the Oder river in accordance with the Potsdam Agreement. Therefore, these transferred territories did not then form part of the Soviet occupation zone of Germany or the subsequent state of East Germany.

The German population who had stayed at or had returned to their homes were forcibly expelled before these Recovered Territories (official term) were repopulated by Poles expelled from the eastern regions and those from central Poland. The borders of Poland resembled the borders of the German-Russian gains in World War 2, with the exception of the city of Bialystok. This is called the Curzon line. The small area of Trans-Olza, which had been annexed by Poland in late 1938, was returned to Czechoslovakia on Stalin's orders.

== See also ==
- Former eastern territories of Germany
- Geography of Poland
- German–Polish Border Treaty of 1990
- Molotov–Ribbentrop Pact
- Treaty of Riga
- Polish–Soviet border agreement of August 1945
- Polish–Soviet War
- Territorial evolution of Poland
- Territories of Poland annexed by the Soviet Union
- Treaty of Zgorzelec of 1950
