= Grzmiąca, Lubusz Voivodeship =

Grzmiąca
- Village
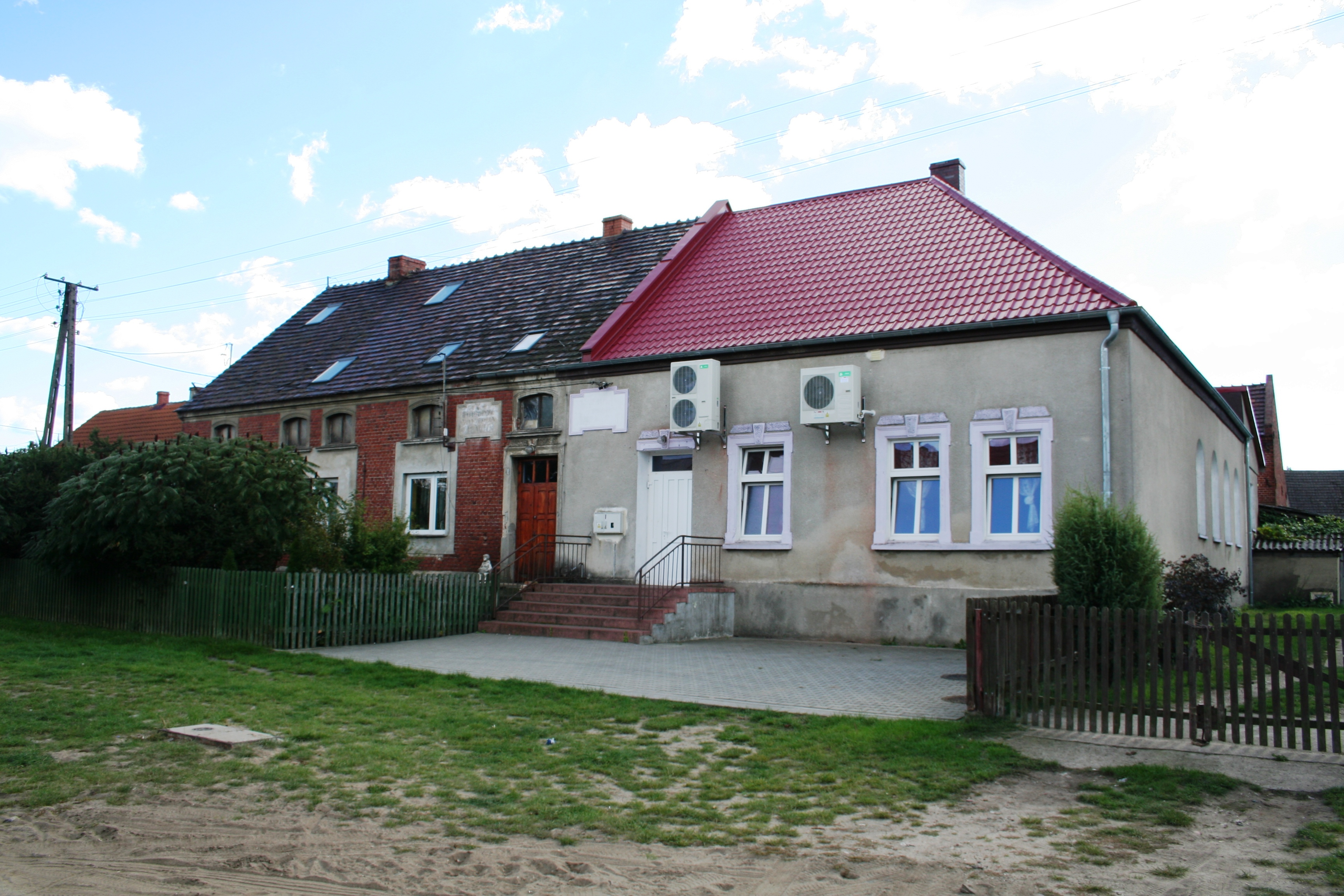
- Former station of the Polish Border Guard in Grzmiąca

- Location within Poland
- Coordinates: 52°10′N 14°45′E
- Country: Poland
- Voivodeship: Lubusz
- County: Słubice
- Gmina: Cybinka
- Population: 440
- Time zone: UTC+1 (CET)
  - Summer (DST): UTC+2 (CEST)
- Vehicle registration: FSL

Grzmiąca [ˈɡʐmjɔnt͡sa] is a village in the administrative district of Gmina Cybinka, within Słubice County, Lubusz Voivodeship, in western Poland, close to the German border. It is located within the historic Lubusz Land.

== History ==
There are several archaeological sites from the Stone Age, Bronze Age, antiquity and the Middle Ages in the village. The area formed part of Poland since the establishment of the state in the 10th century. The territory was administratively located within the Lubusz castellany and the Catholic Diocese of Lubusz, both established in the early 12th century by Polish ruler Bolesław III Wrymouth. The current settlement was probably formed in the early 13th century. It was mentioned in documents in 1385. After Polish rule, the village was part of the Margraviate of Brandenburg and Bohemia (Czechia). Despite the annexation of the territory by Brandenburg, the area was still inhabited by Poles in the 17th century. From the 18th century, it was part of Prussia, and from 1871 to 1945 it was also part of Germany. After the defeat of Nazi Germany in World War II, in 1945, along with the right-bank Lubusz Land (portion situated east of the Oder River) the village became again part of Poland.

== Sports ==
The local football club is Zorza Grzmiąca. It competes in the lower leagues.
