= Białkówek =

- Village
- Location within Poland
- Coordinates: 52°09′36″N 14°47′06″E
- Country: Poland
- Voivodeship: Lubusz
- County: Słubice
- Gmina: Cybinka
- Population: 10

Białkówek [bjau̯ˈkuvɛk] is a village in the administrative district of Gmina Cybinka, within Słubice County, Lubusz Voivodeship, in western Poland, close to the German border.
