= Tawęcin =

- Settlement
- Location within Poland
- Coordinates: 52°08′50″N 14°43′42″E
- Country: Poland
- Voivodeship: Lubusz
- County: Słubice
- Gmina: Cybinka
- Population: 20

Tawęcin [taˈvɛnt͡ɕin] is a settlement in the administrative district of Gmina Cybinka, within Słubice County, Lubusz Voivodeship, in western Poland, close to the German border.
