= Koziczyn, Lubusz Voivodeship =

Koziczyn
- Village
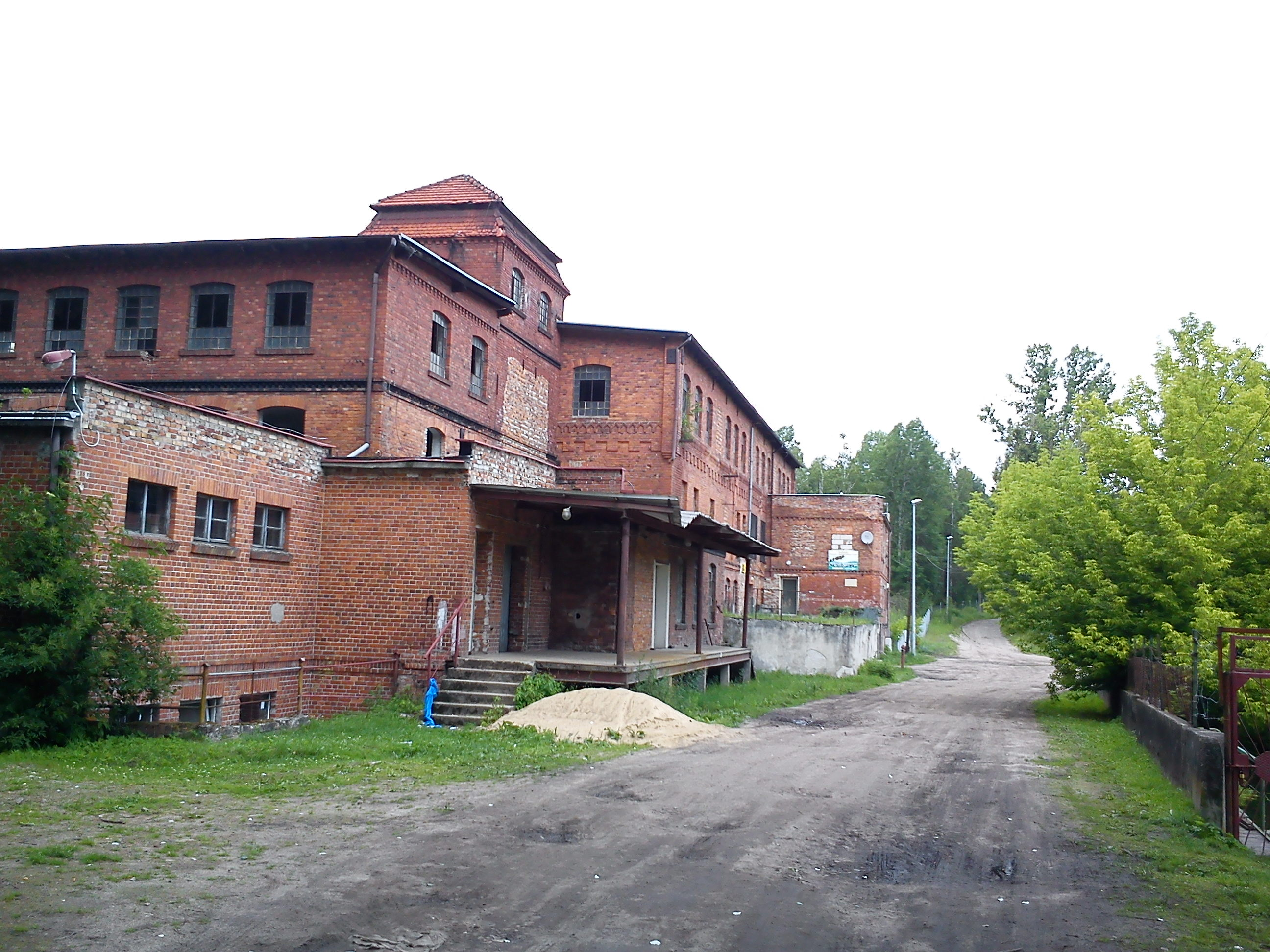
- Brick building in Koziczyn

- Location within Poland
- Coordinates: 52°14′20″N 14°47′04″E
- Country: Poland
- Voivodeship: Lubusz
- County: Słubice
- Gmina: Cybinka

Population
  - Total: 20
- Time zone: UTC+1 (CET)
  - Summer (DST): UTC+2 (CEST)
- Postal code: 69-108
- Vehicle registration: FSL

Koziczyn [kɔˈʑit͡ʂɨn] is a village in the administrative district of Gmina Cybinka, within Słubice County, Lubusz Voivodeship, in western Poland, close to the German border. It is located within the historic Lubusz Land.

== History ==
The area formed part of Poland since the establishment of the state in the 10th century by the Piast dynasty. The territory was administratively located within the Lubusz castellany and the Catholic Diocese of Lubusz, both established in the early 12th century by Polish monarch Bolesław III Wrymouth. After 1249 the village was part of the Margraviate of Brandenburg and Bohemia (Czechia), under the Holy Roman Empire. Despite the annexation of the territory by Brandenburg, the area was still inhabited by Poles in the 17th century. From the 18th century, it was part of Prussia, and from 1871 to 1945 it was also part of unified Germany. It was the location of SS barracks under Nazi Germany. After the defeat of Nazi Germany in World War II, in 1945, along with the right-bank Lubusz Land (portion situated east of the Oder River) the village became again part of Poland.
