= Białków, Słubice County =

Białków
- Village
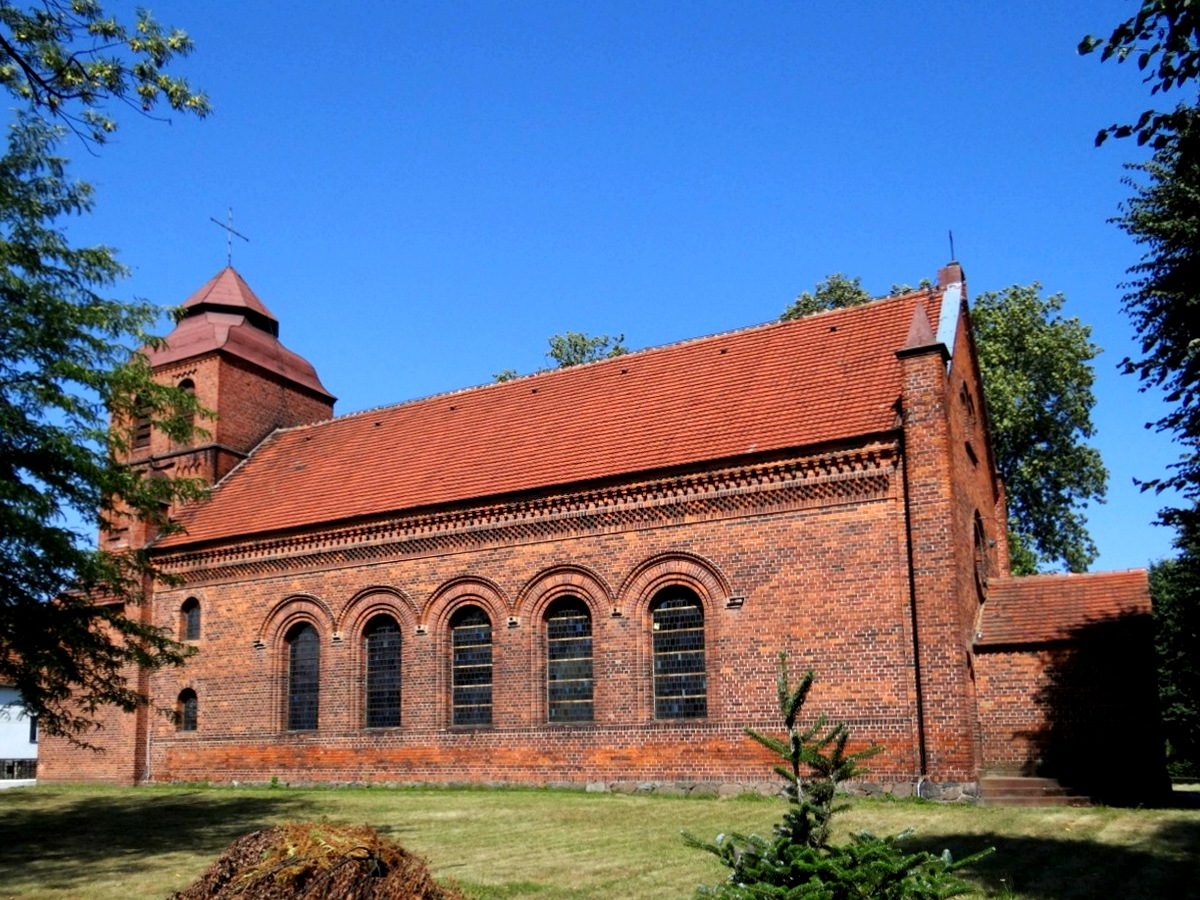
- Saint Andrew Bobola church in Białków

- Location within Poland
- Coordinates: 52°10′0″N 14°48′0″E
- Country: Poland
- Voivodeship: Lubusz
- County: Słubice
- Gmina: Cybinka
- Population: 600
- Time zone: UTC+1 (CET)
  - Summer (DST): UTC+2 (CEST)
- Vehicle registration: FSL

Białków [ˈbjau̯kuf] is a village in the administrative district of Gmina Cybinka, within Słubice County, Lubusz Voivodeship, in western Poland, close to the German border. It is located within the historic Lubusz Land.

The landmarks of Białków are the local palace and the Saint Andrew Bobola church.

== History ==
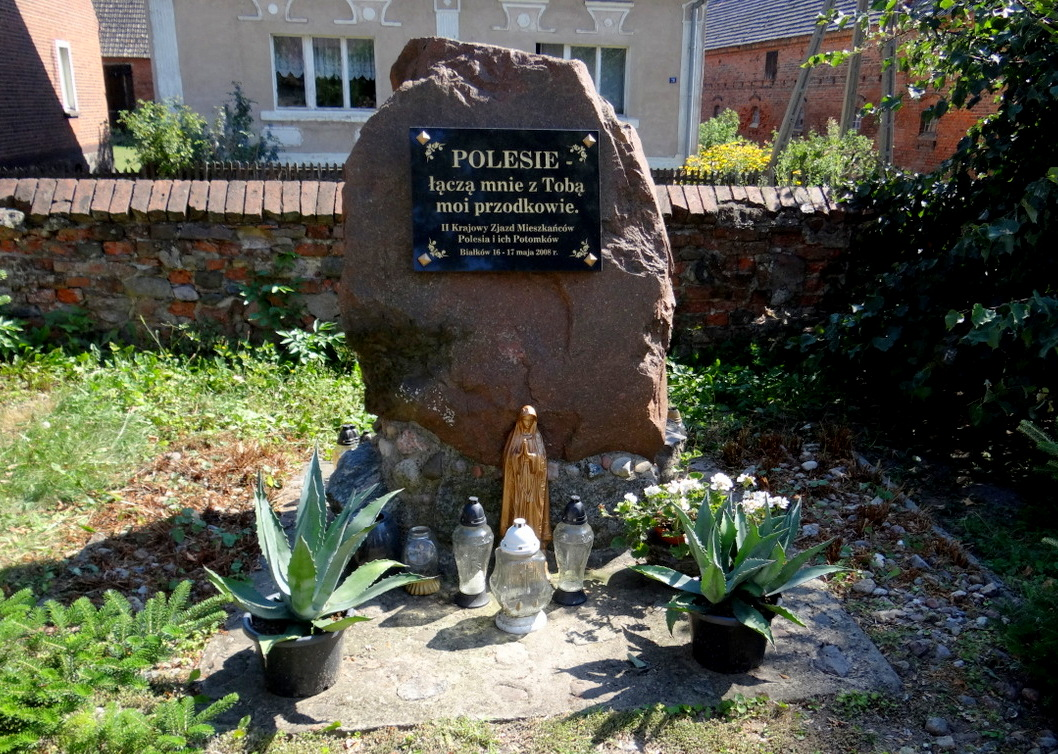
Polesie memorial in Białków

There are several archaeological sites in the village, including remains of a Bronze Age cemetery and an early medieval settlement, which reflect the centuries-old history of the village. The area formed part of Poland since the establishment of the state in the 10th century. The territory was administratively located within the Lubusz castellany and the Catholic Diocese of Lubusz, both established in the early 12th century by Polish ruler Bolesław III Wrymouth. The current settlement was formed in the 13th century. It was first mentioned in 1413, after it was annexed by the Margraviate of Brandenburg. It was a private village, held by various noble families. Despite the annexation of the territory by Brandenburg, the village was still inhabited by Poles in the 17th century, and there were church services in the Polish language. From the 18th century, it was part of Prussia, and from 1871 to 1945 it was also part of Germany. After the defeat of Nazi Germany in World War II, in 1945, along with the right-bank Lubusz Land (portion situated east of the Oder River) the village became again part of Poland. It was repopulated by Poles displaced from the region of Polesie in former Eastern Poland annexed by the Soviet Union.

== Transport ==
The Polish National road 29 runs nearby, northeast of the village.

== Sports ==
The local football club is Polesie Białków. It competes in the lower leagues.
