= Sadoff =

Sadoff is a surname, a transliteration of the Russian surname Sadov. Notable people with the surname include:

- David Sadoff (born 1961), American international law expert
- Fred Sadoff (1926–1994), American actor
- Ira Sadoff (born 1945), American poet

== See also ==
- Sadow (disambiguation)
