= Rybojedzko, Lubusz Voivodeship =

Rybojedzko
- Settlement
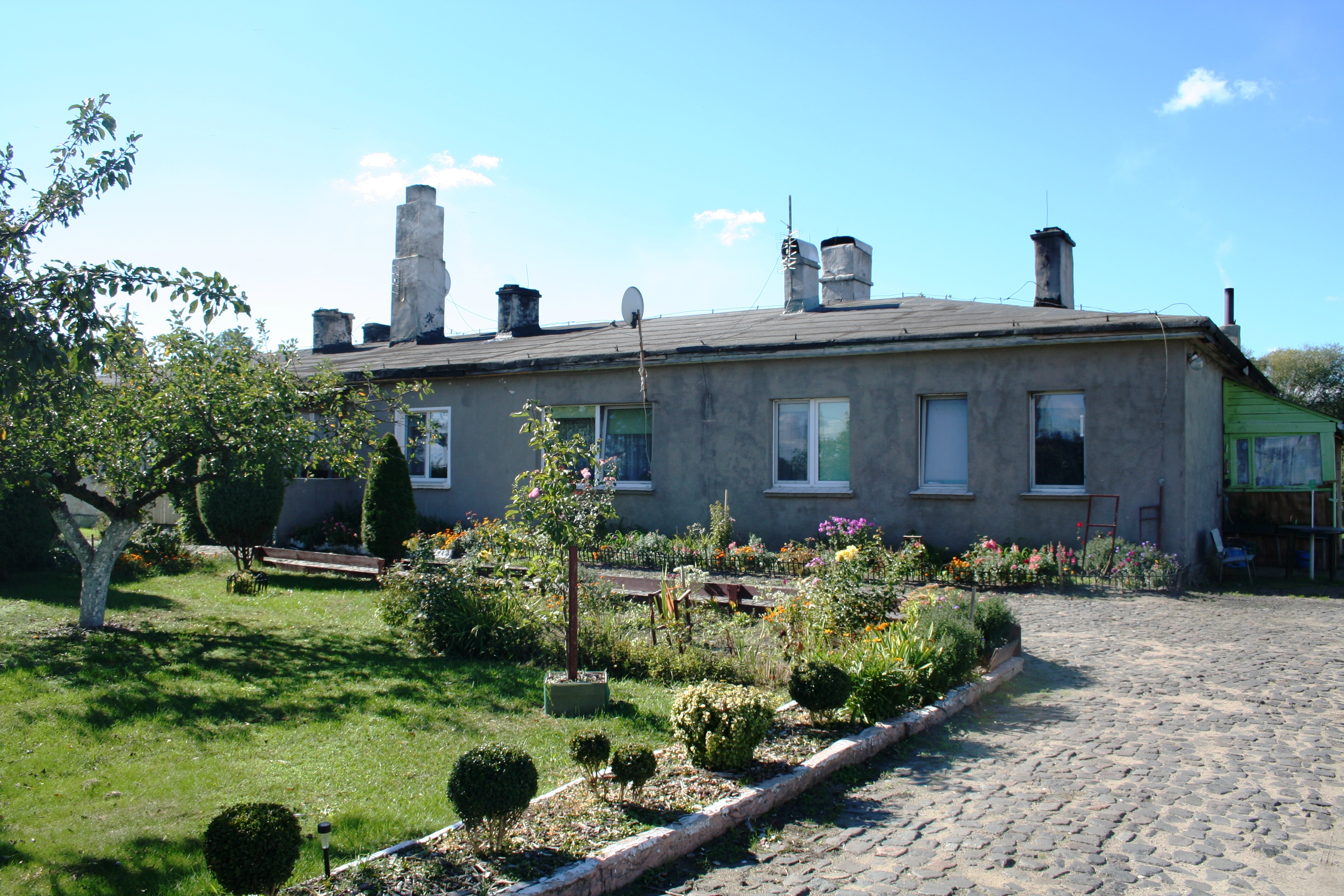

- Location within Poland
- Coordinates: 52°10′21″N 14°42′46″E
- Country: Poland
- Voivodeship: Lubusz
- County: Słubice
- Gmina: Cybinka
- Population: 50

Rybojedzko [rɨbɔˈjɛt͡skɔ] is a settlement in the administrative district of Gmina Cybinka, within Słubice County, Lubusz Voivodeship, in western Poland, close to the German border.
