= Kłopot, Lubusz Voivodeship =

Kłopot
- Village
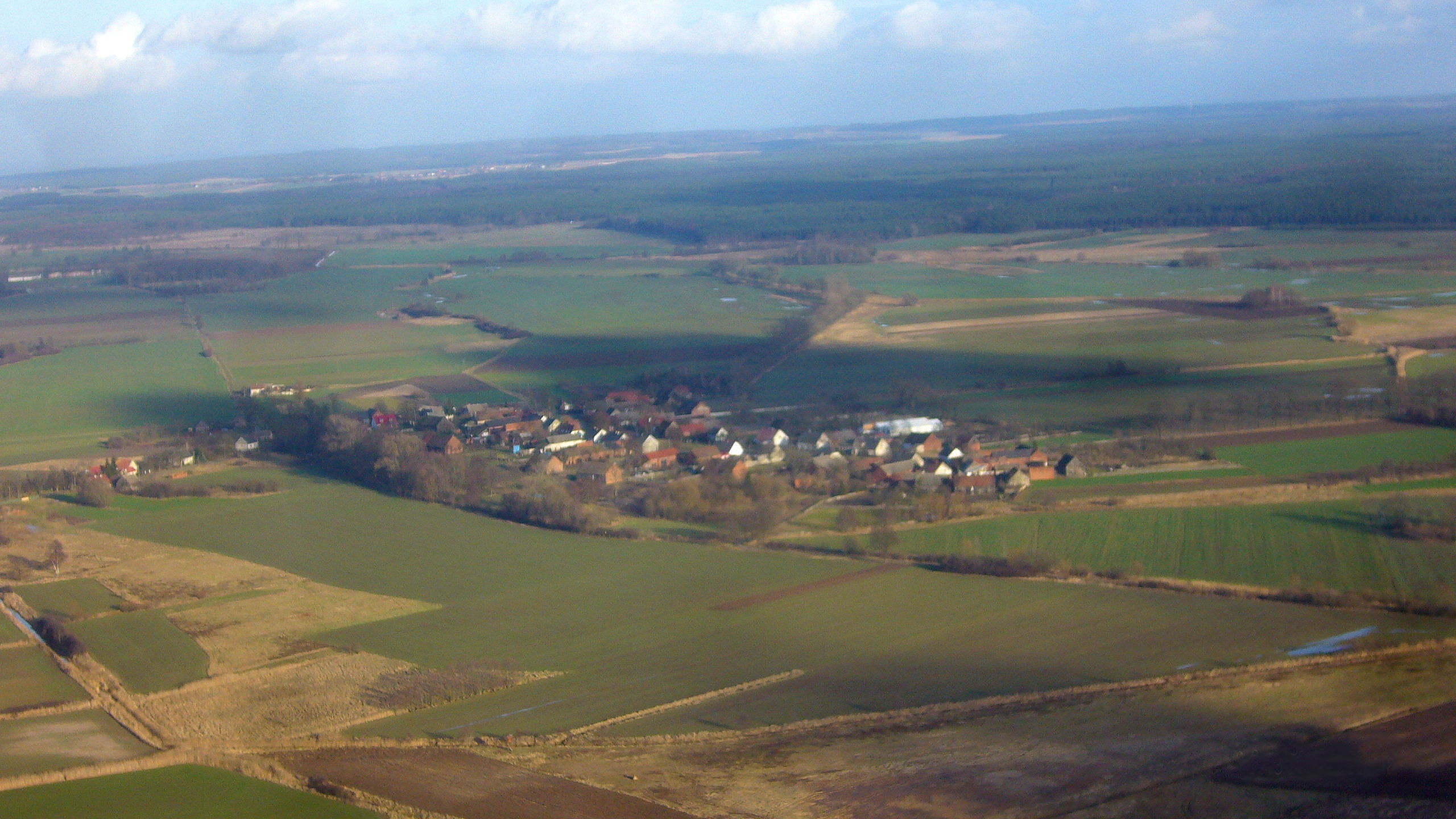

- Location within Poland
- Coordinates: 52°8′N 14°42′E
- Country: Poland
- Voivodeship: Lubusz
- County: Słubice
- Gmina: Cybinka
- Founded: 13th century
- First mentioned: 1350
- Population: 160
- Time zone: UTC+1 (CET)
  - Summer (DST): UTC+2 (CEST)
- Vehicle registration: FSL

Kłopot [ˈkwɔpɔt] (literally: "trouble") is a village in western Poland, in the administrative district of Gmina Cybinka, within Słubice County, Lubusz Voivodeship close to the border with Germany. It is located within the historic Lubusz Land.

Kłopot is known for its high number of resident white storks and is surrounded by the Krzesin Landscape Park.

== History ==
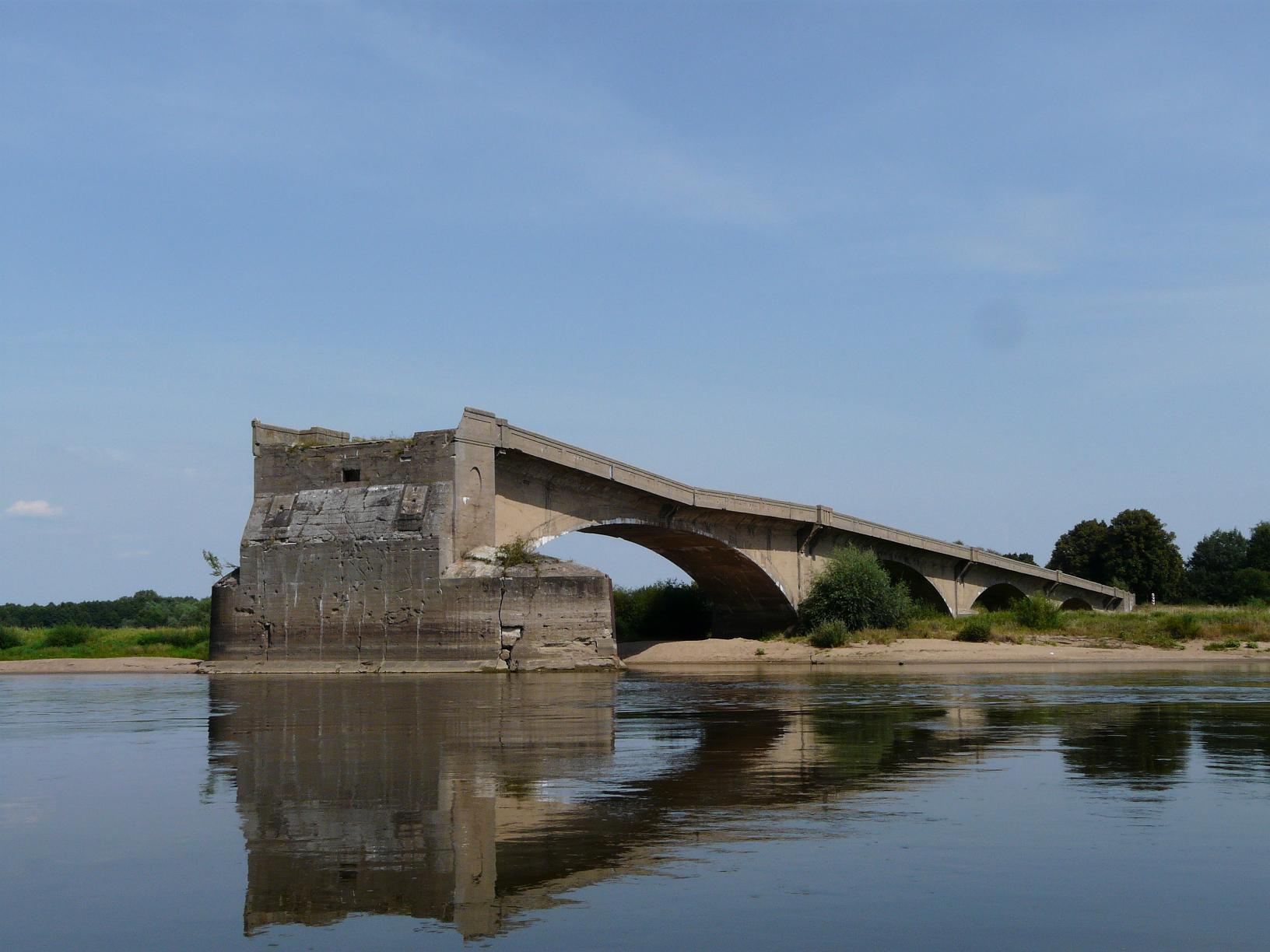
Oder bridge, destroyed in 1945

There are three archaeological sites from the Early Middle Ages in the village. The area formed part of Poland since the establishment of the state in the 10th century. The territory was administratively located within the Lubusz castellany and the Catholic Diocese of Lubusz, both established in the early 12th century by Polish ruler Bolesław III Wrymouth. The current settlement was formed in the early 13th century. Afterwards it passed to the Margraviate of Brandenburg. It was first mentioned in a 1350 deed issued by the Wittelsbach margrave Louis I of Brandenburg, who granted the Neumark estates to the Order of Saint John at Sonnenburg (Słońsk). Plans to connect the village to the Lower Lusatian town of Fürstenberg west of the Oder (today part of Eisenhüttenstadt), similar to the bridge at Frankfurt/Oder–Słubice, had existed since both settlements became part of the Bohemian Crown under Charles IV in 1373. Later on, the village was again part of the separate Margraviate of Brandenburg. Despite the annexation of the territory by Brandenburg, the area was still inhabited by Poles in the 17th century.

From the 18th century, it was part of Prussia, and from 1871 to 1945 it was also part of Germany. The village was secularized by Prussia in 1810. The building of a bridge was not finished until 1919; it was blown up by retiring Wehrmacht troops on 4 February 1945 after the Red Army had reached the river in the course of the Vistula-Oder Offensive. After the defeat of Nazi Germany in World War II, in 1945, along with the right-bank Lubusz Land (portion situated east of the Oder River) the village became again part of Poland.
