= Drzeniów, Słubice County =

Drzeniów
- Village
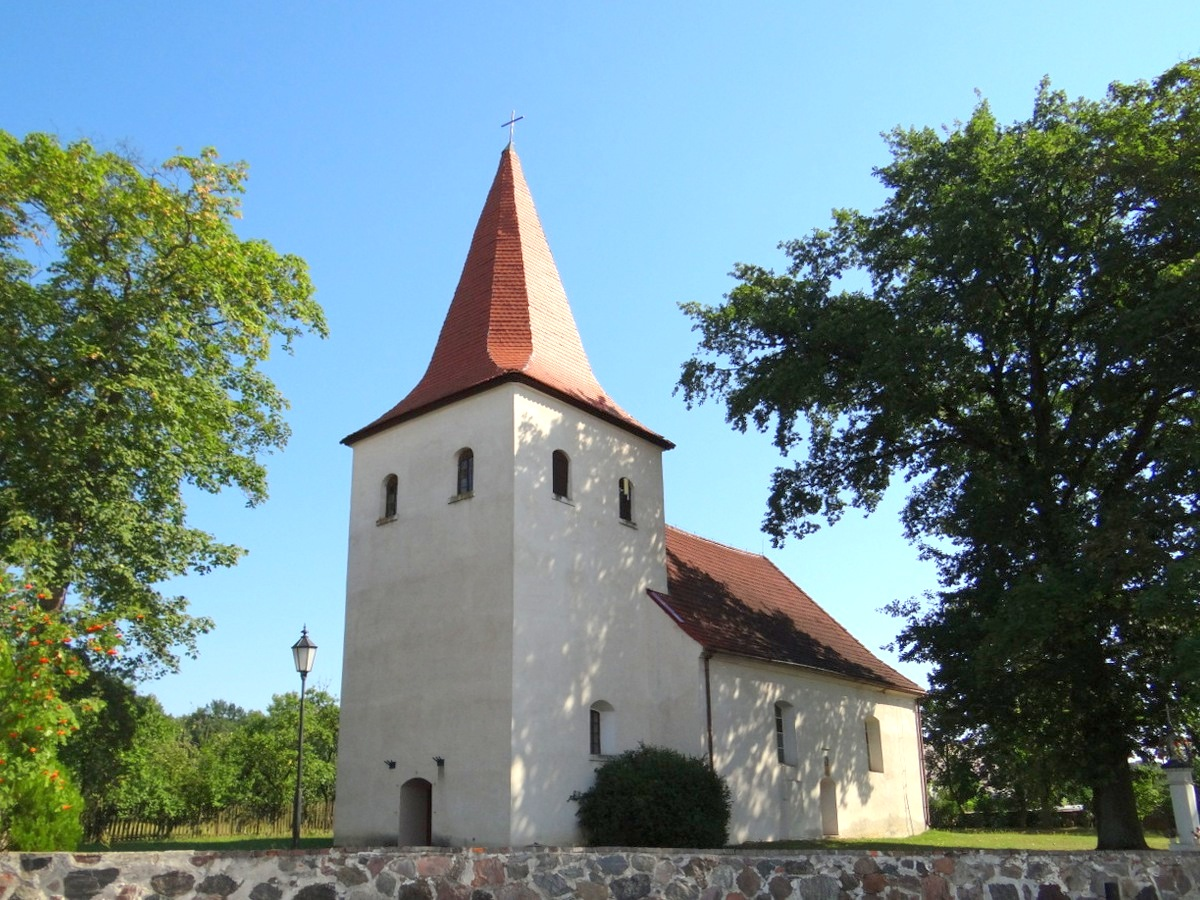
- Catholic church

- Location within Poland
- Coordinates: 52°10′11″N 14°51′56″E
- Country: Poland
- Voivodeship: Lubusz
- County: Słubice
- Gmina: Cybinka
- Population: 380
- Time zone: UTC+1 (CET)
  - Summer (DST): UTC+2 (CEST)
- Vehicle registration: FSL

Drzeniów [ˈdʐɛɲuf] is a village in the administrative district of Gmina Cybinka, within Słubice County, Lubusz Voivodeship, in western Poland, close to the German border. It is located within the historic Lubusz Land.

The landmark of the village is the Gothic Church of Our Lady of Częstochowa.

== History ==
The area formed part of Poland since the establishment of the state in the 10th century. The territory was administratively located within the Lubusz castellany and the Catholic Diocese of Lubusz, both established in the early 12th century by Polish ruler Bolesław III Wrymouth. In the 13th century the first church was built in the village. The village was mentioned in 1308 as a possession of the curia of the Diocese of Poznań. In 1494 Krzysztof Melthicz from Drzeniów confirmed in the Poznań consistory the receipt of a debt of 300 ducats owed by the Polish King Casimir IV Jagiellon to his deceased brother. After Polish rule, the village was part of the Margraviate of Brandenburg and Bohemia (Czechia). Despite the annexation of the territory by Brandenburg, the area was still inhabited by Poles in the 17th century. From the 18th century, it was part of Prussia, and from 1871 to 1945 it was also part of Germany. After the defeat of Nazi Germany in World War II, in 1945, along with the right-bank Lubusz Land (portion situated east of the Oder River) the village became again part of Poland.
