= Rąpice =

- Village
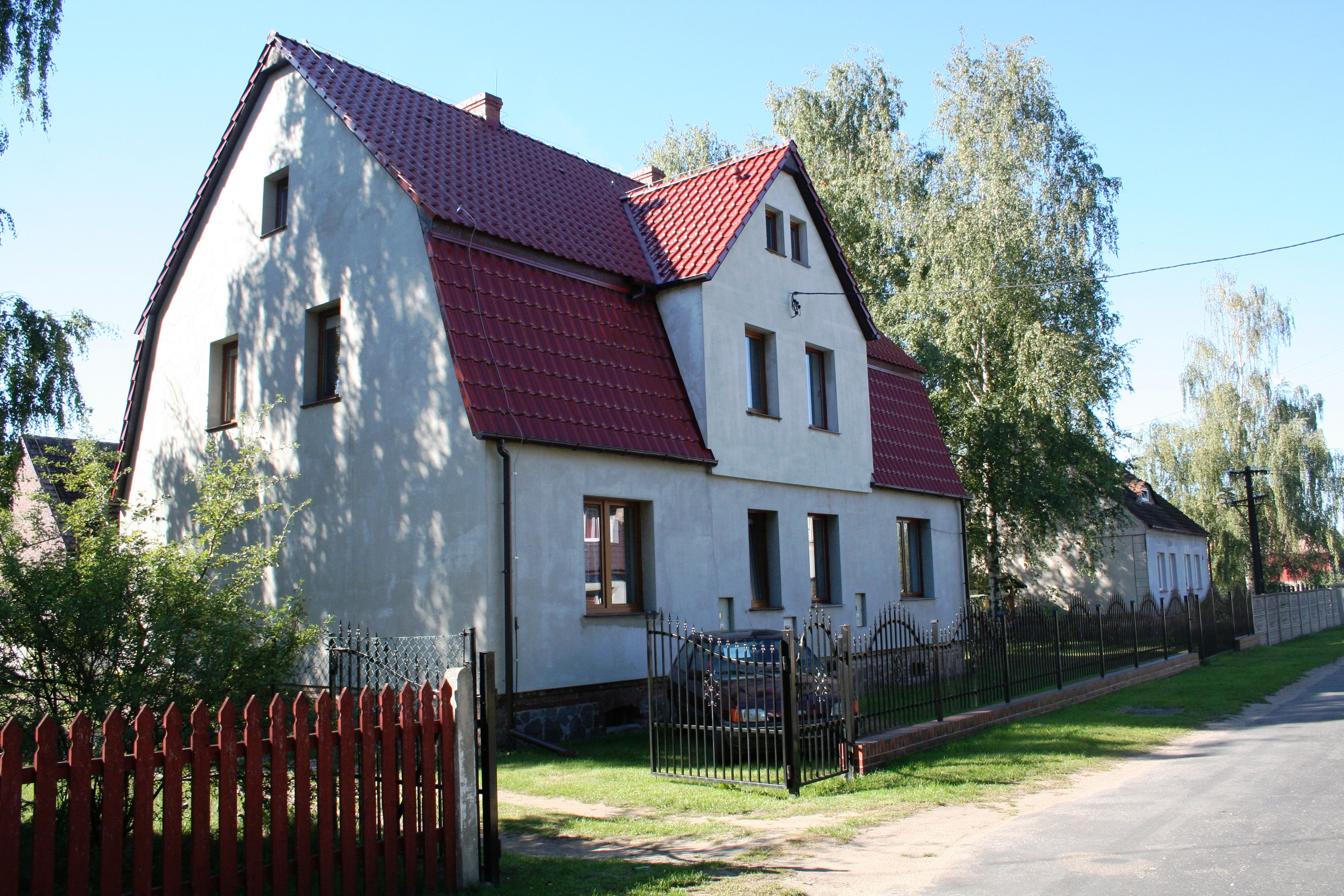
- Former station of the Polish Border Guard in Rąpice

- Location within Poland
- Coordinates: 52°7′N 14°44′E
- Country: Poland
- Voivodeship: Lubusz
- County: Słubice
- Gmina: Cybinka
- First mentioned: 1232

Population
  - Total: 550
- Time zone: UTC+1 (CET)
  - Summer (DST): UTC+2 (CEST)
- Postal code: 69-121
- Vehicle registration: FSL

Rąpice [rɔmˈpit͡sɛ] is a village in the administrative district of Gmina Cybinka, within Słubice County, Lubusz Voivodeship, in western Poland, close to the German border. It is located within the historic Lubusz Land.

== History ==
There are two archaeological sites in the village: one dating back to the Lusatian culture and one dating back to the Early Middle Ages. The area formed part of the Poland since the establishment of the state in the 10th century by the Piast dynasty. The territory was administratively located within the Lubusz castellany and the Catholic Diocese of Lubusz, both established in the early 12th century by Polish ruler Bolesław III Wrymouth. The oldest known mention of the village comes from a document from 1232. In 1277, it became a possession of the Cistercians from Lubiąż. After Polish rule, it was ruled by the Margraviate of Brandenburg and Bohemia (Czechia), which were part of the Holy Roman Empire. Despite the annexation of the territory by Brandenburg, the village was still inhabited by Poles in the 17th century, and there were church services in the Polish language. From the 18th century, it was part of Prussia, and from 1871 to 1945 it was also part of unified Germany. After the defeat of Nazi Germany in World War II, in 1945, along with the right-bank Lubusz Land (portion situated east of the Oder River) the village became again part of Poland.

== Sports ==
The local football club is Odra Rąpice. It competes in the lower leagues.
