= Sądów, Lubusz Voivodeship =

Sądów
- Village
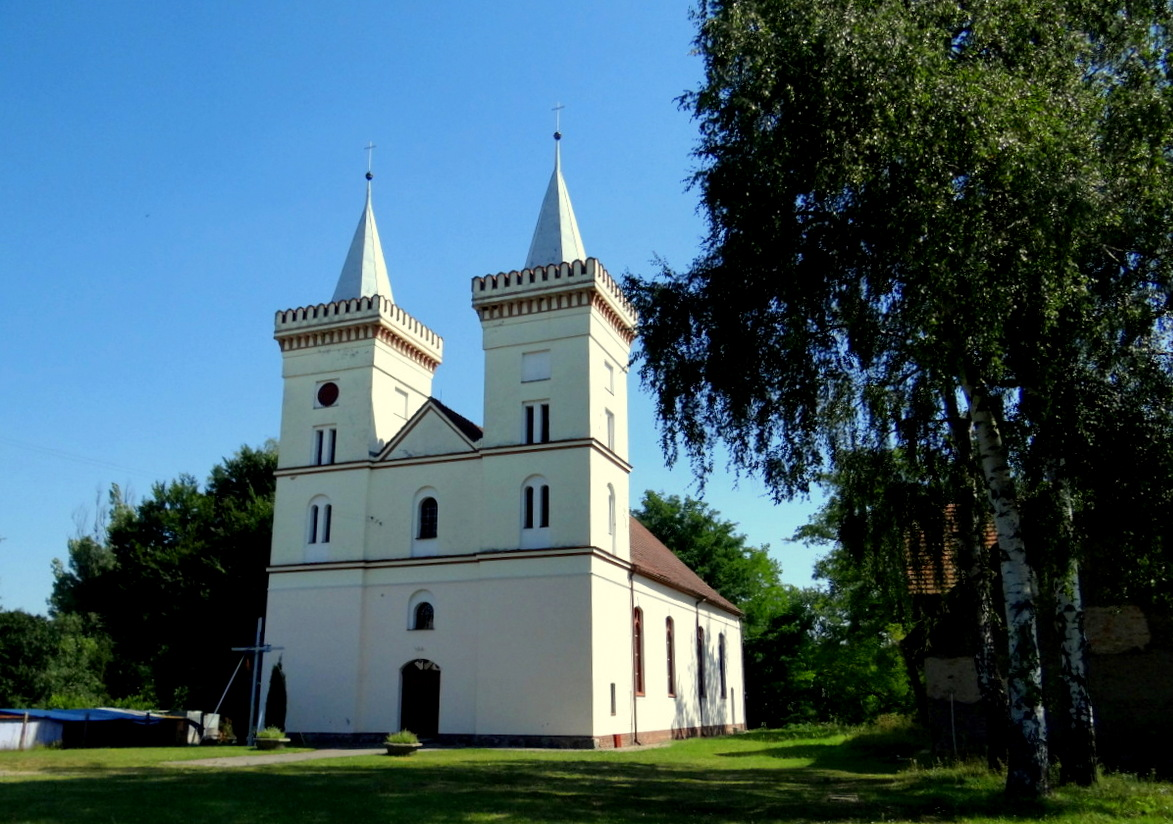
- Saint Anthony church in Sądów

- Location within Poland
- Coordinates: 52°13′N 14°50′E
- Country: Poland
- Voivodeship: Lubusz
- County: Słubice
- Gmina: Cybinka
- Founded: 13th century
- First mentioned: 1249
- Population: 500
- Time zone: UTC+1 (CET)
  - Summer (DST): UTC+2 (CEST)
- Vehicle registration: FSL

Sądów [ˈsɔnduf] is a village in the administrative district of Gmina Cybinka, within Słubice County, Lubusz Voivodeship, in western Poland, close to the German border. It is located within the historic Lubusz Land.

== History ==
There are several archaeological sites from the Bronze Age, antiquity and Early Middle Ages in the village. The area formed part of Poland since the establishment of the state in the 10th century. The territory was administratively located within the Lubusz castellany and the Catholic Diocese of Lubusz, both established in the early 12th century by Polish ruler Bolesław III Wrymouth. The current settlement was formed in the early 13th century. It was first mentioned in documents in 1249, and in 1375 it was mentioned as a town, however, it was deprived of town rights after 1600. After Polish rule, it was ruled by the Margraviate of Brandenburg and Bohemia (Czechia). Despite the annexation of the territory by Brandenburg, the village was still inhabited by Poles in the 17th century, and there were church services in the Polish language. From the 18th century, it was part of Prussia, and from 1871 to 1945 it was also part of Germany. After the defeat of Nazi Germany in World War II, in 1945, along with the right-bank Lubusz Land (portion situated east of the Oder River) the village became part of Poland again.
