= Sadov (surname) =

Sadov (feminine: Sadova) is a Russian surname. Notable people with the surname include:

- Dmitri Sadov (born 1997), Russian footballer
- Natalya Sadova (born 1972), Russian discus thrower

== See also ==
- Sadoff
- Sadow
