= Mielesznica =

- Village
- Location within Poland
- Coordinates: 52°8′N 14°45′E
- Country: Poland
- Voivodeship: Lubusz
- County: Słubice
- Gmina: Cybinka
- Population: 50

Mielesznica [mjɛlɛʂˈnit͡sa] is a village in the administrative district of Gmina Cybinka, within Słubice County, Lubusz Voivodeship, in western Poland, close to the German border.
