= Radzików, Lubusz Voivodeship =

Radzików
- Village
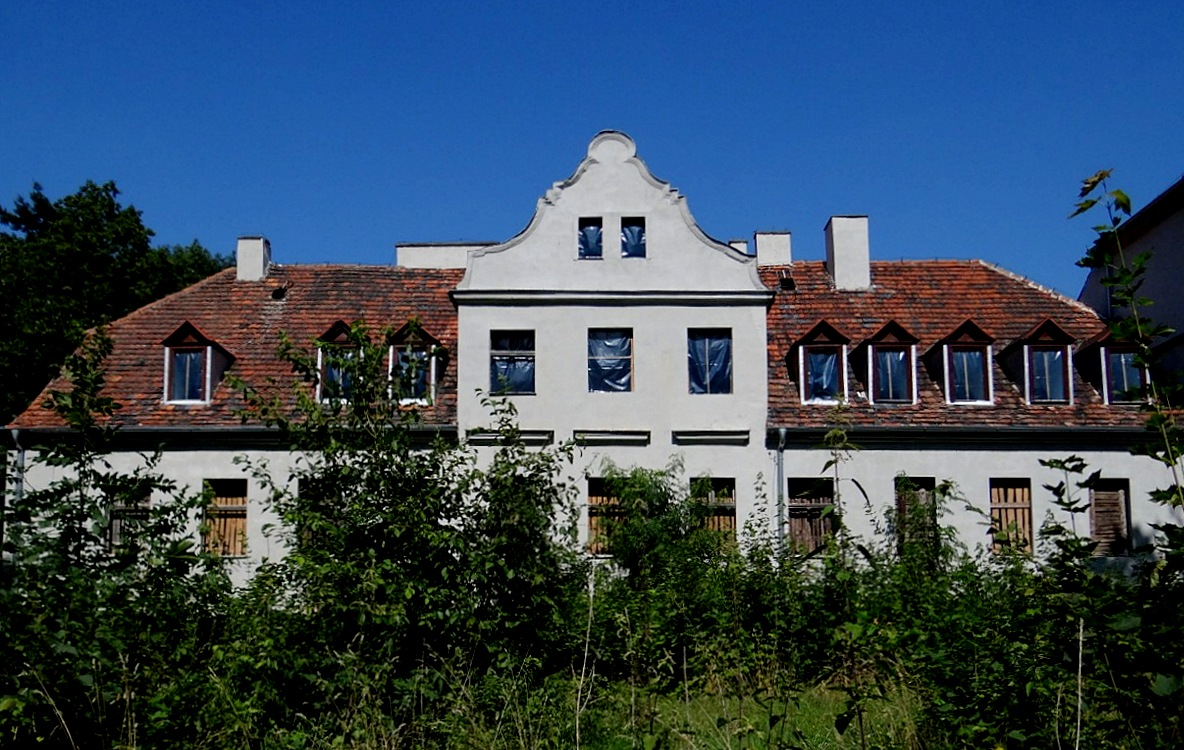
- Manor

- Location within Poland
- Coordinates: 52°16′N 14°52′E
- Country: Poland
- Voivodeship: Lubusz
- County: Słubice
- Gmina: Cybinka
- Population: 500

Radzików [raˈd͡ʑikuf] is a village in the administrative district of Gmina Cybinka, within Słubice County, Lubusz Voivodeship, in western Poland, close to the German border.
