= Cybinka =

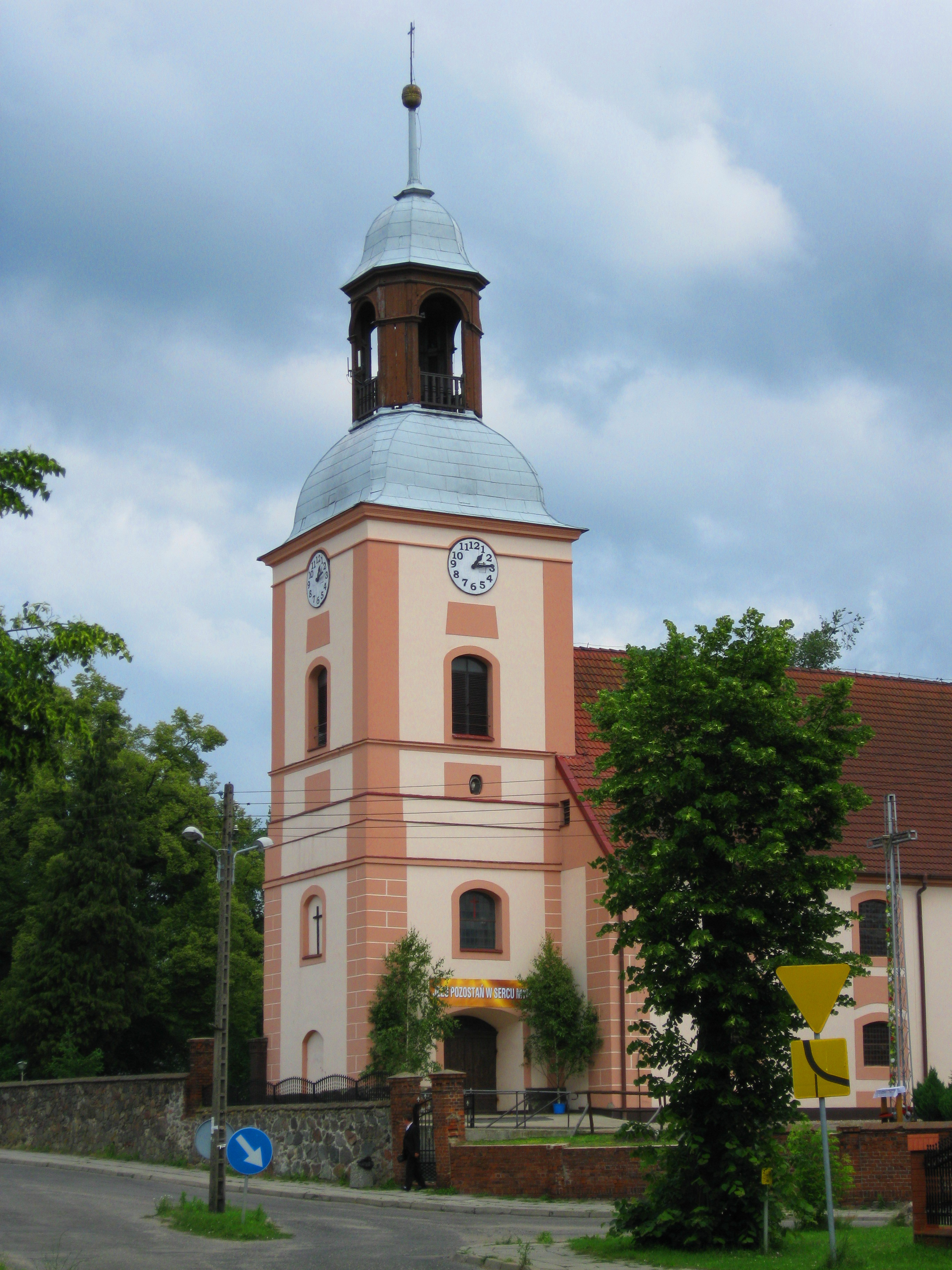
- Our Lady of Częstochowa church in Cybinka

- Flag Coat of arms

- Location within Poland
- Coordinates: 52°12′N 14°48′E
- Country: Poland
- Voivodeship: Lubusz
- County: Słubice
- Gmina: Cybinka
- First mentioned: 1472
- Town rights: 1945

Government
  - Mayor: Marek Kołodziejczyk

Area
  - Total: 5.32 km^{2} (2.05 sq mi)

Population (31 December 2021)
  - Total: 2,704
  - Density: 508/km^{2} (1,320/sq mi)
- Time zone: UTC+1 (CET)
  - Summer (DST): UTC+2 (CEST)
- Postal code: 69-108
- Area code: +48 68
- Vehicle registration: FSL
- Website: cybinka.pl

Cybinka [t͡sɨˈbʲiŋka] (German: Ziebingen) is a town in western Poland, in Słubice County, Lubusz Voivodeship. It is the administrative seat of the Gmina Cybinka.

== Geography ==
Cybinka is located near the Oder river and the border with Germany, about 24 kilometres (15 miles) southeast of Słubice and about 61 kilometres (38 miles) northwest of the regional capital Zielona Góra. It is part of the historic Lubusz Land. As of December 2021, the town has 2,704 inhabitants.

== History ==
Historical population
Year	Pop.	±%
1946	1,025	—
1950	1,571	+53.3%
1960	2,506	+59.5%
2010	2,689	+7.3%

The region of Lubusz Land formed part of Poland since the creation of the state in the 10th century. The territory was administratively located within the Lubusz castellany and the Catholic Diocese of Lubusz, both established in the early 12th century by Polish ruler Bolesław III Wrymouth. Cybinka was probably founded in the 13th century. It was first mentioned in 1472, when the Lubusz Land had been incorporated into the Neumark region of the Margraviate of Brandenburg. In 1582 the margraves enfeoffed Ziebingen to the Protestant Order of Saint John commandry at Łagów. Despite the annexation of the territory by Brandenburg, the area was still inhabited by Poles in the 17th century, and there were church services held in the Polish language.

The Order held the town until 1804; a local castle served as the seat of a commander (Komtur). From 1751 it was a possession of the Burgsdorff noble dynasty, who had it rebuilt in a Neo-Classical style. From 1801 it was the home of the Romantic poet Ludwig Tieck, who also stayed here after the castle was acquired by the Finck von Finckenstein family in 1802. Ziebingen became a venue for Romantic authors like Per Atterbom, Achim von Armin, Clemens Brentano or Joseph von Eichendorff, until in 1819 Tieck left for Dresden.

The town's surrounding was home to a historic Slavic speaking minority in a German-speaking area.

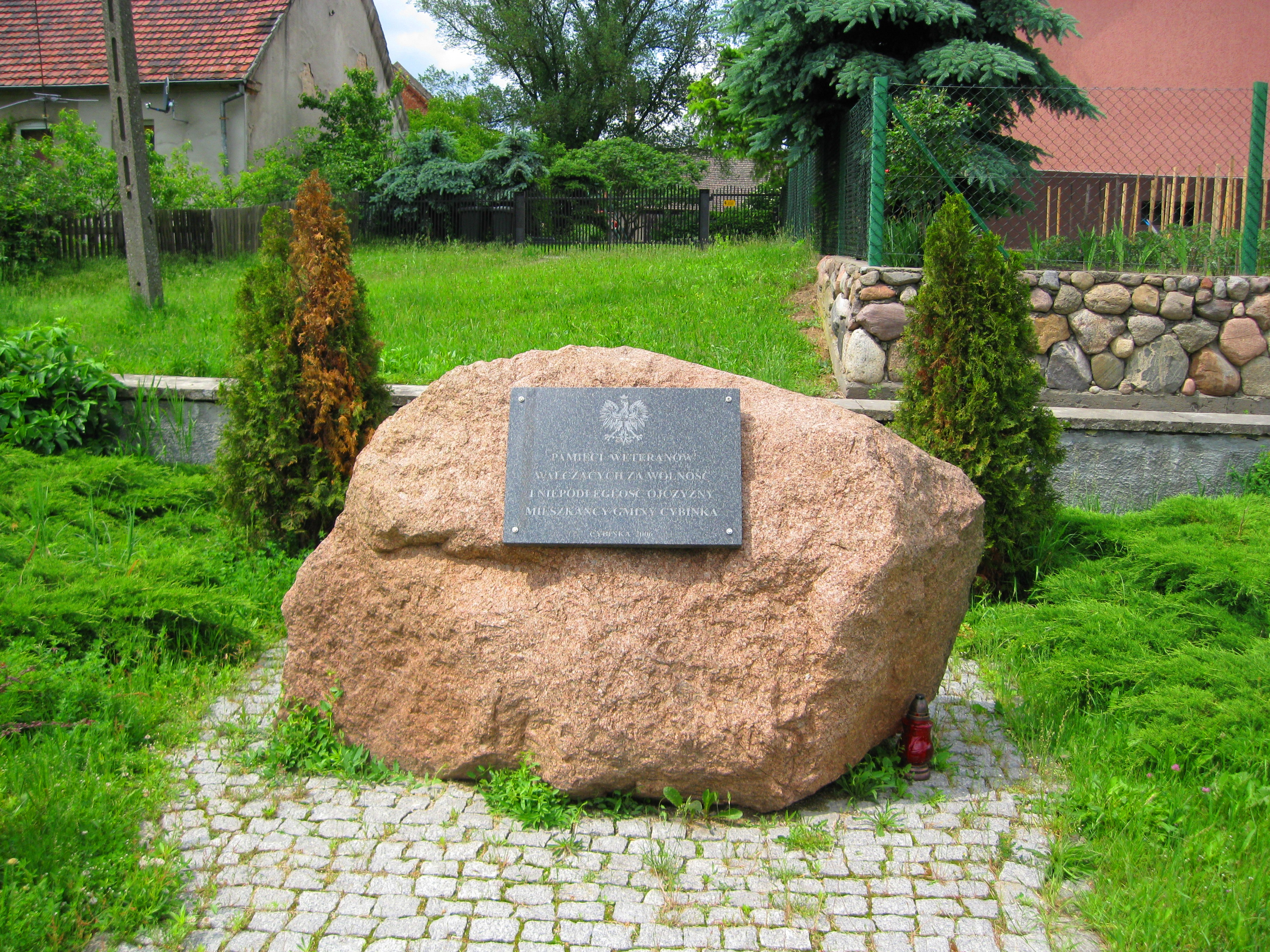
A memorial stone dedicated to the veterans of the fight for Poland's freedom and independence

From 1815 Ziebingen was part of the Prussian province of Brandenburg. Ziebingen was devastated in the course of the Vistula–Oder Offensive of the Red Army on 4 February 1945. The Finckenstein castle survived the war, but burnt down completely in 1973. After Nazi Germany's defeat in World War II right-bank Lubusz Land (portion situated east of the Oder River) became again part of Poland, although with a Soviet-installed communist regime, which stayed in power until the Fall of Communism in the 1980s. The town's population was expelled in totality.

Cybinka was granted town rights in 1945. The 32nd Infantry Regiment of the Polish Army was stationed in the town shortly after the war. The town also became the seat of the newly formed Cybinka forest district of the Polish State Forests.

The first confirmed case of COVID-19 in Poland involved a patient from Cybinka in March 2020.

== Twin towns – sister cities ==
See twin towns of Gmina Cybinka.
