= David Sadoff =

International law and policy expert

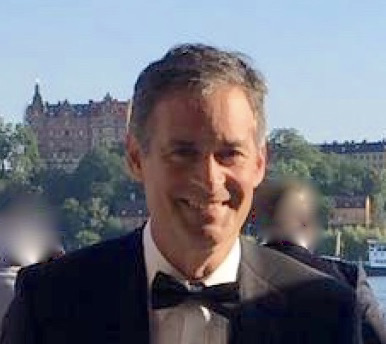
- Education: Harvard University, Georgetown University, Dartmouth College, Geneva Academy of International Humanitarian Law and Human Rights, Université de Genève

David Sadoff (born 1961) is an American international law and policy expert, specializing in rule of law programming, intelligence affairs, and international enforcement law. He has served as managing director of the Clooney Foundation for Justice, general counsel of the International Development Law Organization, and deputy legal adviser and director of intelligence programs and reform on the National Security Council staff.

== Education ==
Sadoff earned his bachelor's degree from Dartmouth College (1983), a Master in Public Policy from Harvard University (1986), and a J.D. from Georgetown University (1995). He also received an LL.M in International Humanitarian Law from the Geneva Academy of International Humanitarian Law and Human Rights in 2007 and a Ph.D in Public International Law from the Université de Genève in 2014.

== Career ==
Sadoff began his career in the Politico-Military Affairs Bureau of the United States Department of State, then worked as a policy adviser, consultant, and commercial litigator. He then spent five years as Assistant General Counsel with the Central Intelligence Agency and subsequently was seconded to the White House to serve in both legal and policy capacities at the National Security Council.

Sadoff spent the next decade in Switzerland, Nepal, and Italy, heading up the Nepal Country Office of the American Bar Association Rule of Law Initiative and as General Counsel at the Rome-based International Development Law Organization.

Upon returning to the U.S., Sadoff was a lecturer in law at the University of Pennsylvania Carey Law School, executive director of the Center for Ethics and the Rule of Law, and managing director of the Clooney Foundation for Justice -- George Clooney and Amal Clooney's international criminal justice NGO.

== Publications ==
In 2016, Sadoff published Bringing International Fugitives to Justice: Extradition and Its Alternatives with Cambridge University Press. He has also published extensively in law journals and reporters, including in the Georgetown Journal of International Law, Vanderbilt Journal of Transnational Law, and American Criminal Law Review.

== Affiliations ==
- Arcadia University, Trustee
- St. Stephen's School Rome, Trustee and Vice Chair
- Forum on Education Abroad, Board Director
- World Engagement Institute, Distinguished International Research Fellow
- Centre for International Sustainable Development Law, Senior Research Fellow
- Enough Project, Non-Resident Senior Fellow

== Personal life ==
Sadoff is the son of Robert L. Sadoff, a forensic psychiatrist, and Joan H. Sadoff, a civil rights film documentarian. He lives in northern California with his wife. He has three children.
