= Sadow =

Sadow is a place name or surname.

== Place name ==
- Sadów, Silesian Voivodeship, Poland
- Sądów, Lubusz Voivodeship, Poland
- Sądów, West Pomeranian Voivodeship, Poland

== Surname ==
- Aaron Sadow, American chemist
- Jeffrey D. Sadow (born 1962), American political scientist
- Steven Sadow, American criminal defence attorney

== See also ==
- Sadov
