= Gmina Cybinka =

Gmina Cybinka Cybinka Commune
- Gmina
- Flag Coat of arms
- Interactive map of Gmina Cybinka
- Coordinates (Cybinka): 52°12′N 14°48′E
- Country: Poland
- Voivodeship: Lubusz
- County: Słubice
- Seat: Cybinka

Area
  - Total: 279.72 km^{2} (108.00 sq mi)

Population (2019-06-30)
  - Total: 6,492
  - Density: 23.21/km^{2} (60.11/sq mi)
  - Urban: 2,749
  - Rural: 3,743
- Website: https://www.cybinka.pl

Gmina Cybinka is an urban-rural gmina (administrative district) in Słubice County, Lubusz Voivodeship, in western Poland, on the German border. Its seat is the town of Cybinka, which lies approximately 24 kilometres (15 mi) south-east of Słubice, 57 km (35 mi) north-west of Zielona Góra, and 67 km (42 mi) south-west of Gorzów Wielkopolski.

The gmina covers an area of 279.72 square kilometres (108.0 sq mi), and as of 2019 its total population is 6,492.

The gmina contains part of the protected area called Krzesin Landscape Park.

== Villages ==
Gmina Cybinka contains the villages and settlements of Białków, Bieganów, Drzeniów, Grzmiąca, Kłopot, Krzesin, Maczków, Mielesznica, Radzików, Rąpice, Sądów and Urad. (2019–2024)

== Neighbouring gminas ==
Gmina Cybinka is bordered by the gminas of Gubin, Maszewo, Rzepin, Słubice and Torzym. It also borders Germany.

== Twin towns – sister cities ==
Gmina Cybinka is twinned with:

- Amt Brieskow-Finkenheerd, Germany
