= Bronze and Iron Age Poland =

Archaeology of Poland 4400-2000 years ago

The Bronze and Iron Age cultures in Poland are known mainly from archaeological research. Early Bronze Age cultures in Poland began around 2400–2300 BC, while the Iron Age commenced in approximately 750–700 BC. The Iron Age archaeological cultures no longer existed by the start of the Common Era. The subject of the ethnicity and linguistic affiliation of the groups living in Central Europe at that time is, given the absence of written records, speculative, and accordingly there is considerable disagreement. In Poland the Lusatian culture, spanning both the Bronze and Iron Ages, became particularly prominent. The most famous archaeological finding from that period is the Biskupin fortified settlement (gord) on the lake from which it takes its name, representing the Lusatian culture of the early Iron Age.

The Bronze Age in Poland consisted of Period I (early), 2300 to 1600 BC; Period II (older), 1600 to 1350 BC; Period III (middle), 1350 to 1100 BC; Period IV (younger), 1100 to 900 BC; Period V (late), 900 to 700 BC. The Early Iron Age included Hallstatt Period C, 700 to 600 BC, and Hallstatt Period D, 600 to 450 BC.

Bronze items present in Poland around 2300 BC were brought through the Carpathian Basin. The native Early Bronze Age that followed was dominated by the innovative Únětice culture in western Poland, and by the conservative Mierzanowice culture in the east. Those were replaced in their respective territories, for the duration of the second, the Older Bronze Period, by the (pre-Lusatian) Tumulus culture and the Trzciniec culture. Characteristic of the remaining bronze periods were the Urnfield cultures; within their range skeletal burials had been replaced by cremation of bodies throughout much of Europe. In Poland the Lusatian culture settlements dominated the landscape for nearly a thousand years, continuing into and including the Early Iron Age. A series of Scythian invasions, beginning in the 6th century BC, precipitated the demise of the Lusatian culture. The Hallstatt Period D was the time of expansion of the Pomeranian culture, while the Western Baltic Kurgans culture occupied the Masuria-Warmia region of contemporary Poland.

== Únětice and other Bronze Age cultures ==
=== Únětice culture ===
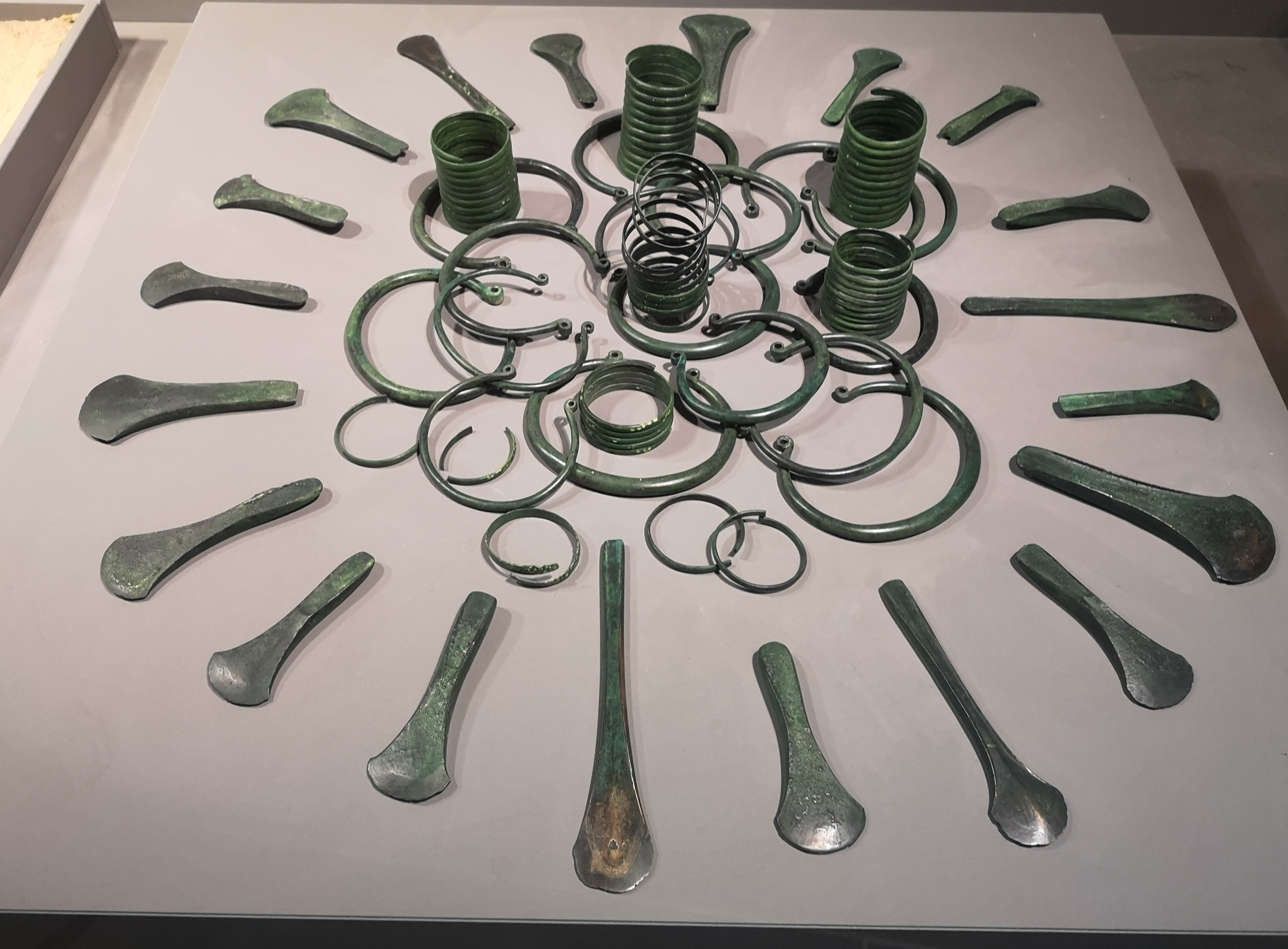
Hoard of bronze artefacts from Pilszcz

The Bronze Age in Poland, as well as elsewhere in central Europe, begins with the innovative Únětice culture, in existence in Silesia and a part of Greater Poland during the first period of this era, that is from before 2200 to 1600 BC. This settled agricultural society's origins consisted of the conservative traditions inherited from the Corded Ware populations and dynamic elements of the Bell-Beaker people. Significantly, the Únětice people cultivated contacts with the highly developed cultures of the Carpathian Basin, through whom they had trade links with the cultures of early Greece. Their culture also echoed inspiring influence coming all the way from the most highly developed at that time civilizations of the Middle East.

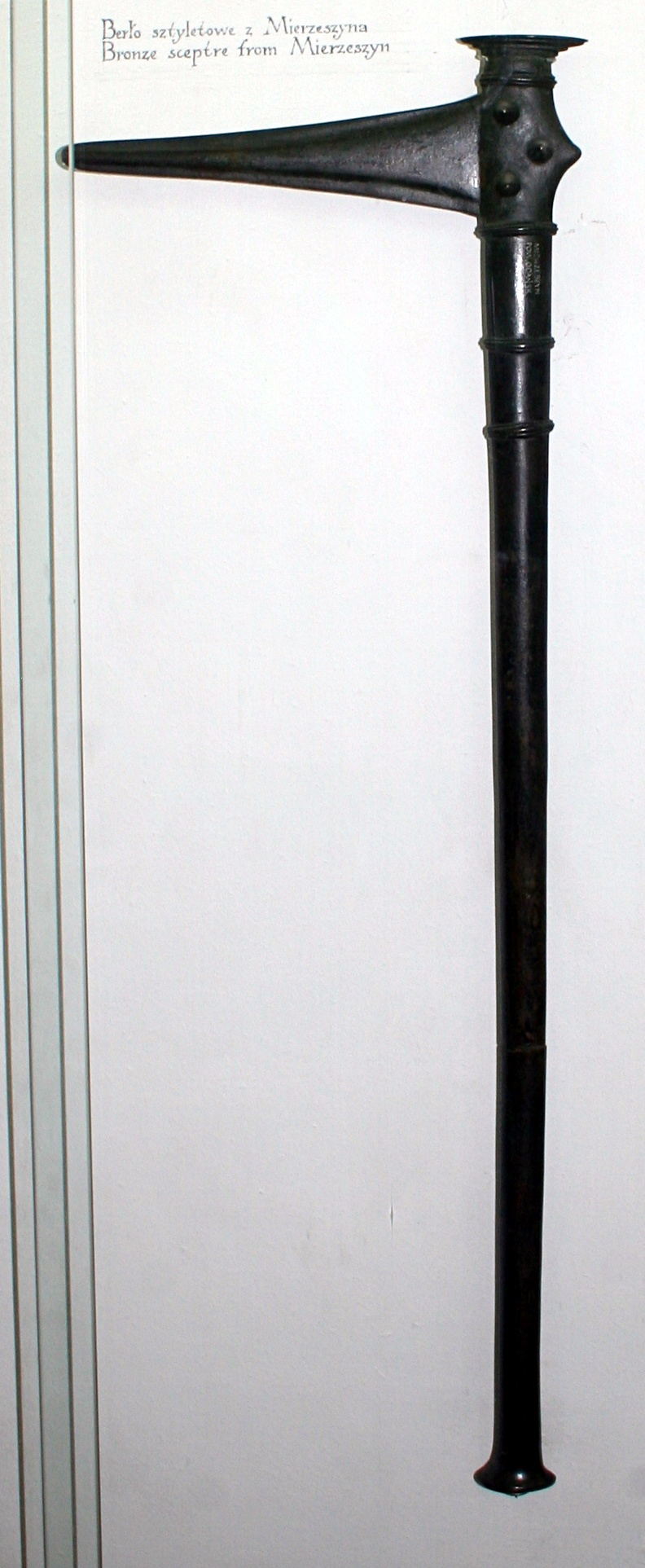
Bronze halberd, Únětice culture, Poland

Characteristic of the Únětice societies was greater general affluence and developed social stratification, compared with Late Neolithic cultures. Objects made of bronze, often of luxurious or prestigious nature, were in high demand as symbols of power and importance and are typically found in the graves of "princes". Fourteen such burial sites, circular mounds of earth heaped up on top of wooden, clay and stone structures, some as large as 30 meters in diameter, were found in Łęki Małe near Grodzisk Wielkopolski, erected 2000–1800 BC, suggesting the existence of a local dynasty. Proliferation of locally made bronze items (Uneticean daggers were in high demand all over Europe and in Anatolia) far from the centers of ore mining or bronze craftsmanship shows that the elites were able to control the trade routes, which also involved the transportation of amber from the Baltic Sea shores to Aegean Sea area artisans. Many concealed (for unknown reasons) bronze treasures have been found, including a fine one from Pilszcz near Głubczyce. Stylistically refined Uneticean ceramics show inspiration from the Achaean vessels obtained through trade. Fortified settlements were built; one actively researched site, that was utilized and went through a number of phases during the 2000–1500 BC period, is in Bruszczewo in Kościan County. Remains of settlements and cemeteries were discovered around Wrocław and elsewhere in Lower Silesia, including an amber processing workshop in Nowa Wieś, Bolesławiec County.

The nature of the weapons and other items found at Únětice sites suggests a chronic state of warfare and the emergence of a warrior class. At the forefront of civilization in its time and place, the Únětice culture eventually succumbed to social and economic deterioration; its demise may have been hastened by destructive raids waged by the warriors of the belligerent Burial Mound culture, which in the end replaced it.

=== Iwno culture ===
The Iwno culture, named after Iwno near Szubin, was a contemporary of the Únětice culture. Located in Kujawy, eastern (Gdańsk) Pomerania and northeastern Greater Poland, it was influenced by the Únětice culture, from where their bronze items were imported, and had many common traits with the Mierzanowice culture (see below). Iwno thin-walled clay vessels were carefully finished and domestic animal rising was important for the economy.

=== Płonia group ===
The Płonia group of a comparable period, named after a neighborhood of Szczecin, extended over central and western Polish Pomerania; it is known for stone chest burials.

=== Mierzanowice culture ===
East of the Únětice culture, in Lesser Poland and further north to the Masovia region, during roughly the same span of time, lay the territory of the Mierzanowice culture, named after the type-site village near Opatów. These people, culturally also descendants of the Corded Ware culture, at first lived as mobile cattle breeders, but around 2200 BC started building permanent settlements and engaged in agriculture as well. Mierzanowice culture was a conservative society, frequently still using stone tools and reserving copper for decorations.

The Pleszów group of the Mierzanowice culture originated the most significant of the Polish Bronze Age fortified settlements, located in Trzcinica near Jasło. It was constructed on a particularly suitable, elevated natural location, with the initial enclosed area of 0.6 hectares. It remained in continuous use from about 2100 to 1300 BC and is often dubbed the Carpathian Troy or the Troy of the North. The area has been a site of archaeological explorations for the past hundred years, but only the more recent investigations uncovered its true significance in terms of the understanding of the early Bronze Age developments in central Europe. 30,000 Pleszów group artifacts have been unearthed, including exceptionally well-made ornamented pottery and weaving equipment. Some of the objects recovered, as well as the nature of the defensive structures, reveal the Pleszów group's contacts with the Carpathian Basin peoples and the resulting influence coming from their cultures.

=== Strzyżów culture ===
Of the same cultural sphere as Mierzanowice, still further east was the Strzyżów culture, named after the village near Hrubieszów.

=== Otomani-Füzesabony culture ===
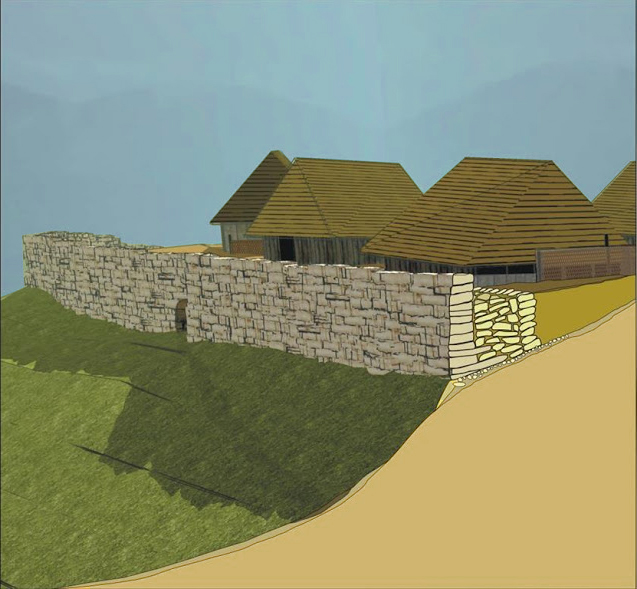
Fortified settlement at Góra Zyndrama, Otomani-Füzesabony culture, 1750 BC

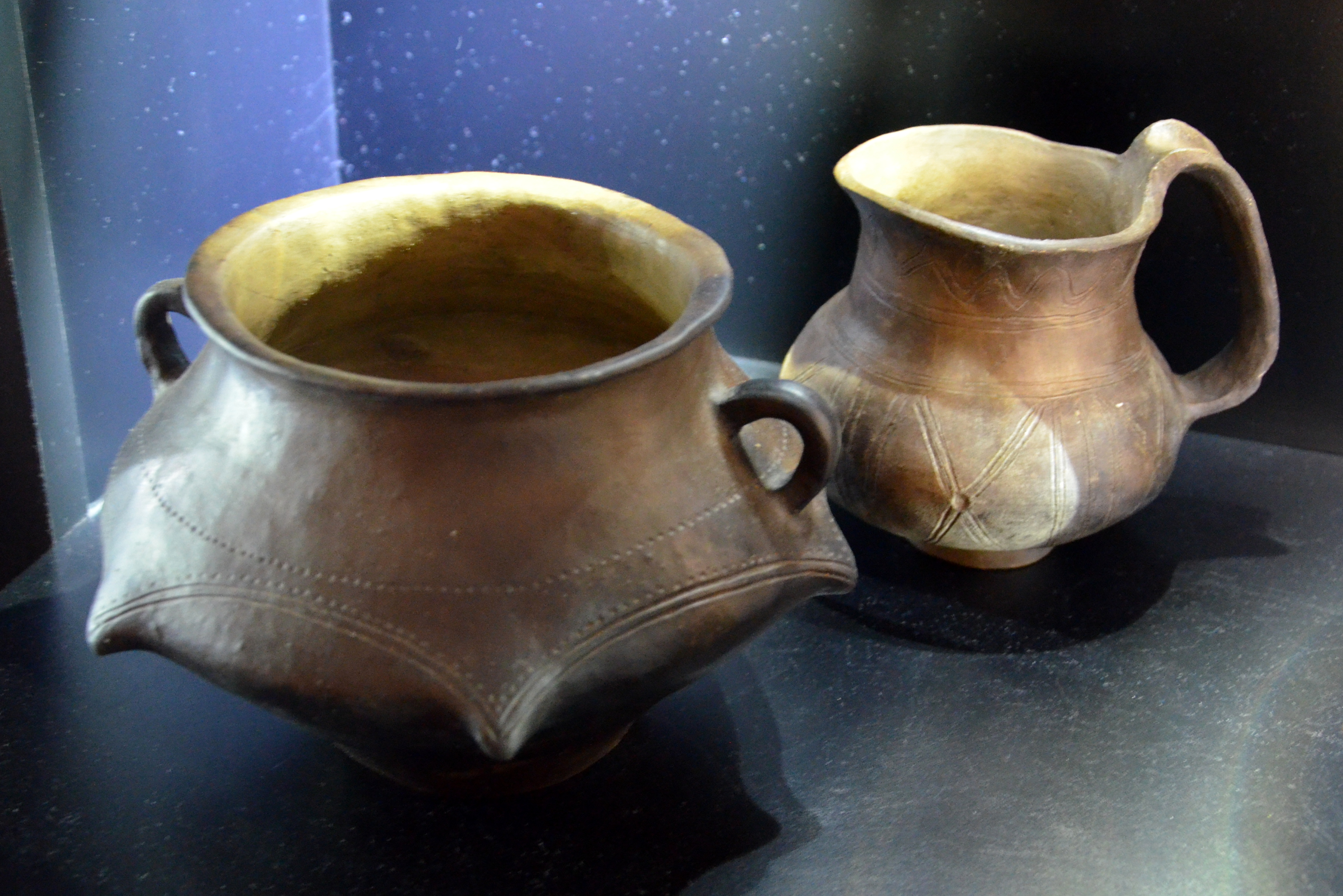
Otomani-Füzesabony pottery, Poland

Highly advanced Otomani-Füzesabony culture people arrived in Trzcinica area around 1650 BC, coming from the regions south of the Carpathian Mountains, and took over the settlement developed earlier by the Pleszów group, as they were settling the Wisłoka River drainage area. They assimilated the local population and created a more powerful stronghold by rebuilding and expanding with remarkable engineering ingenuity the existing structure. The Otomani people left over 60,000 identified relics (including, unlike those of the Mierzanowice people, numerous luxury bronze items), many of which are a manifestation of their close ties with the Mediterranean area cultures – whence the "Troy connection". The Trzcinica fortress was burned, rebuilt and expanded again (to 2 hectares), and after 1350 BC abandoned for over two thousand years. The settlement was repopulated by the Slavs who around 770–780 AD built a massive gord here.^{[a]}

The above cultures constitute the first (early) period of the Bronze Age in Poland, ca. 2300 to 1600 BC.

=== Trzciniec culture ===
Throughout their range and beyond, the Mierzanowice and Strzyżów cultures (and the more southern part of the Iwno culture) were replaced by the Trzciniec culture. It was named after Trzciniec near Puławy and lasted from 1700 to 1100 BC, that is throughout the second and third periods of the Bronze Age. It was probably made up of diverse post-Neolithic populations, whose common characteristic was the type of pottery – large vessels with a thickened upper edge and a horizontal decorative protrusion around the neck, first found around northern Germany at the beginning of the millennium. Their own production of bronze objects came late and only in the western part of this culture's range.

A kurgan burial site of the Trzciniec culture, in use from the 15th to the early 12th century BC was preserved in Dacharzów near Sandomierz. The central bottom part of the structure consists of two adjacent rectangular stone burial chambers with wooden floors. The larger one contains the bones of several women and children, the smaller one the cremated remains of one older man. Clay pots and copper decorations were also present. The chambers were covered by wooden construction supporting stone slanting walls/roofs, the whole structure being covered by a large (12–13 meters in diameter) earth mound. In addition to this oldest part – the main burial of an apparent tribal chief and his family, there are newer peripheral graves at the edge of the kurgan and items indicating a prolonged cemetery and local cult use of this burial complex.

Small scale and sparse settlement areas with more primitive crafts were thought to be characteristic of the Trzciniec culture period and distribution. However a comprehensive, long-functioning a well-developed complex has been found near Polesie, Łowicz County, with objects carbon-dated from 1530 to 1210 BC. The utilized living space, a complete "microcosm", had the area of 17 hectares, bordered by two streams, with fields, animal quarters and workshops. Cattle and pigs were kept, while the farmers cultivated oats, wheat and barley and caused devastation of the natural environment surroundings. Skeletons examined indicate that many residents suffered from tooth decay. Among the many thousand stone remnants discovered there are ceremonial staffs (maces) with a wooden handle, indicating influence from the distant Mesopotamia and the East in general. Melting and processing of bronze took place and salt was imported from regions further south. The main identified burial site was actively and repeatedly utilized for generations, bodies rearranged, the grave dug in the ground being covered by a mound five meters in diameter.

=== Tumulus culture ===
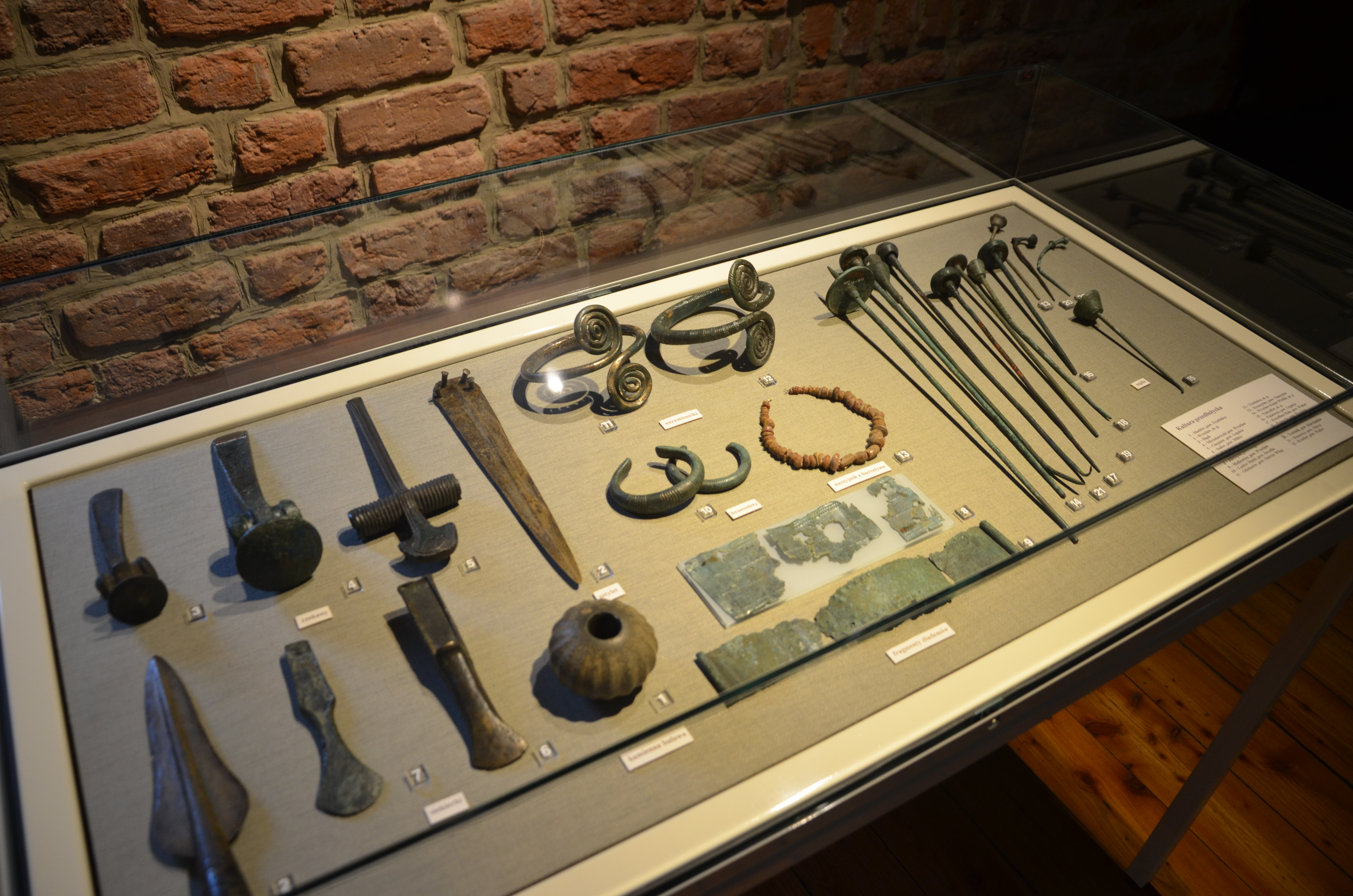
Tumus culture artefacts from Silesia, 16th–14th centuries BC

Proto-Lusatian Tumulus or Burial Mound culture of Danubian origin thrived in western Polish lands during the 1700–1400 BC period, and contributed to the birth and rise of the Urnfield cultures. Around 1400 BC it was replaced by the most important of them – the Lusatian culture. Burial Mound culture again was a complex of cultures, which replaced the Únětice culture and had an earth and stone mound grave as their common trait. The burials are skeletal, as opposed to the cremation practices of the later Urnfield cultures. There are no substantial settlements left by the Burial Mound people, whose agricultural practices were apparently limited mostly to animal husbandry. They developed bronze metallurgy to a large extent, satisfying their own needs for weapons and richly designed and executed decorations. Their dominant social class were the warriors, who were equal and were the only men entitled to a tumulus burial.

=== Piliny culture ===
The Piliny culture (1500–1200 BC, roughly the third or middle period of the Bronze Age) of Hungary and Slovakia, and also southern Lesser Poland, where like others they left bronze treasures, is an early example of the Urnfield cultures. These cultures' burial customs involved cremation of bodies and placing the ashes in urns (often with small apertures, presumably for the soul to escape). The urns were buried without a mound, sometimes forming huge cemeteries with thousands of such graves.

== Lusatian culture of the later Bronze Age ==
=== General characteristics ===
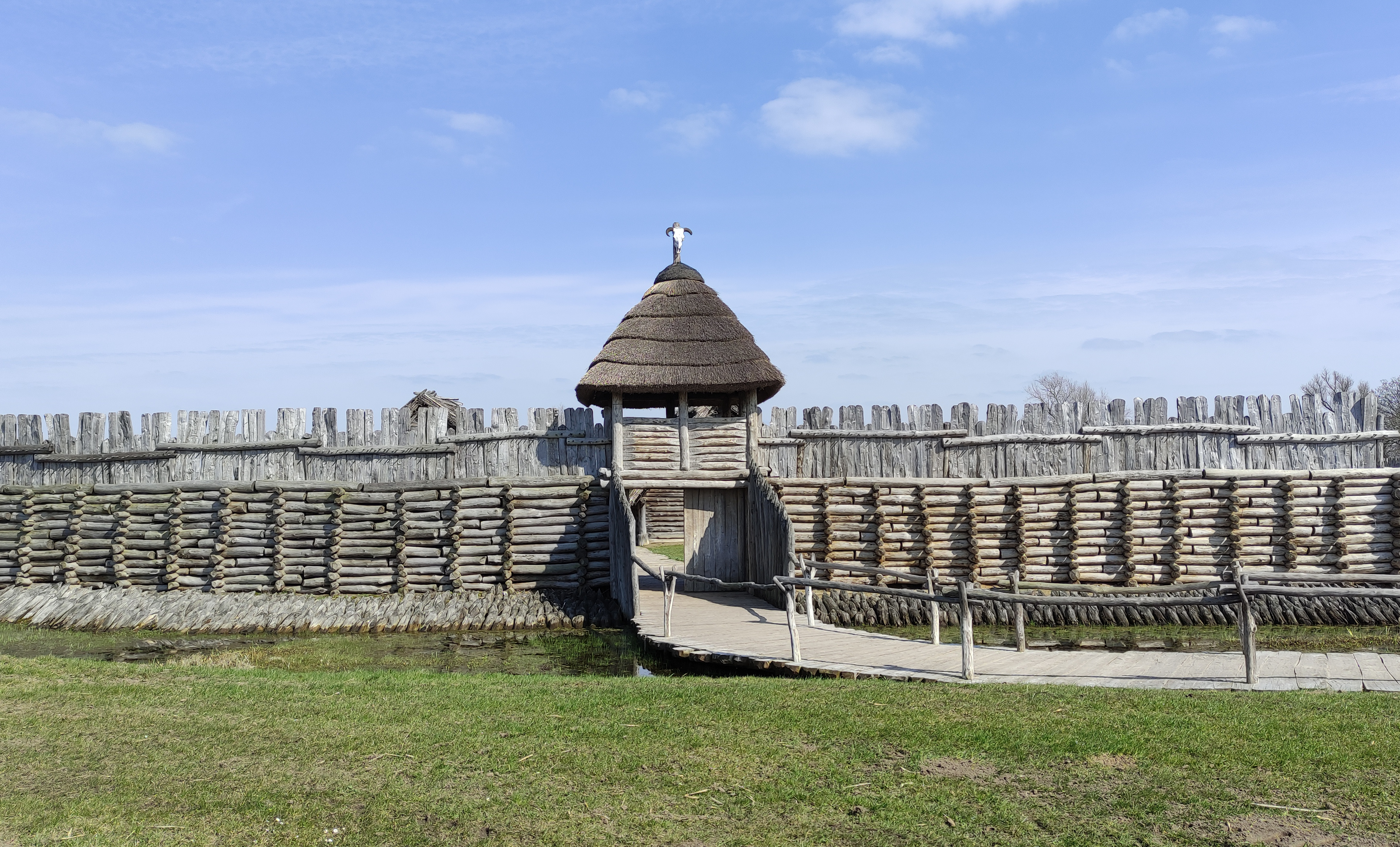
Reconstructed fortified settlement of Biskupin, Lusatian culture

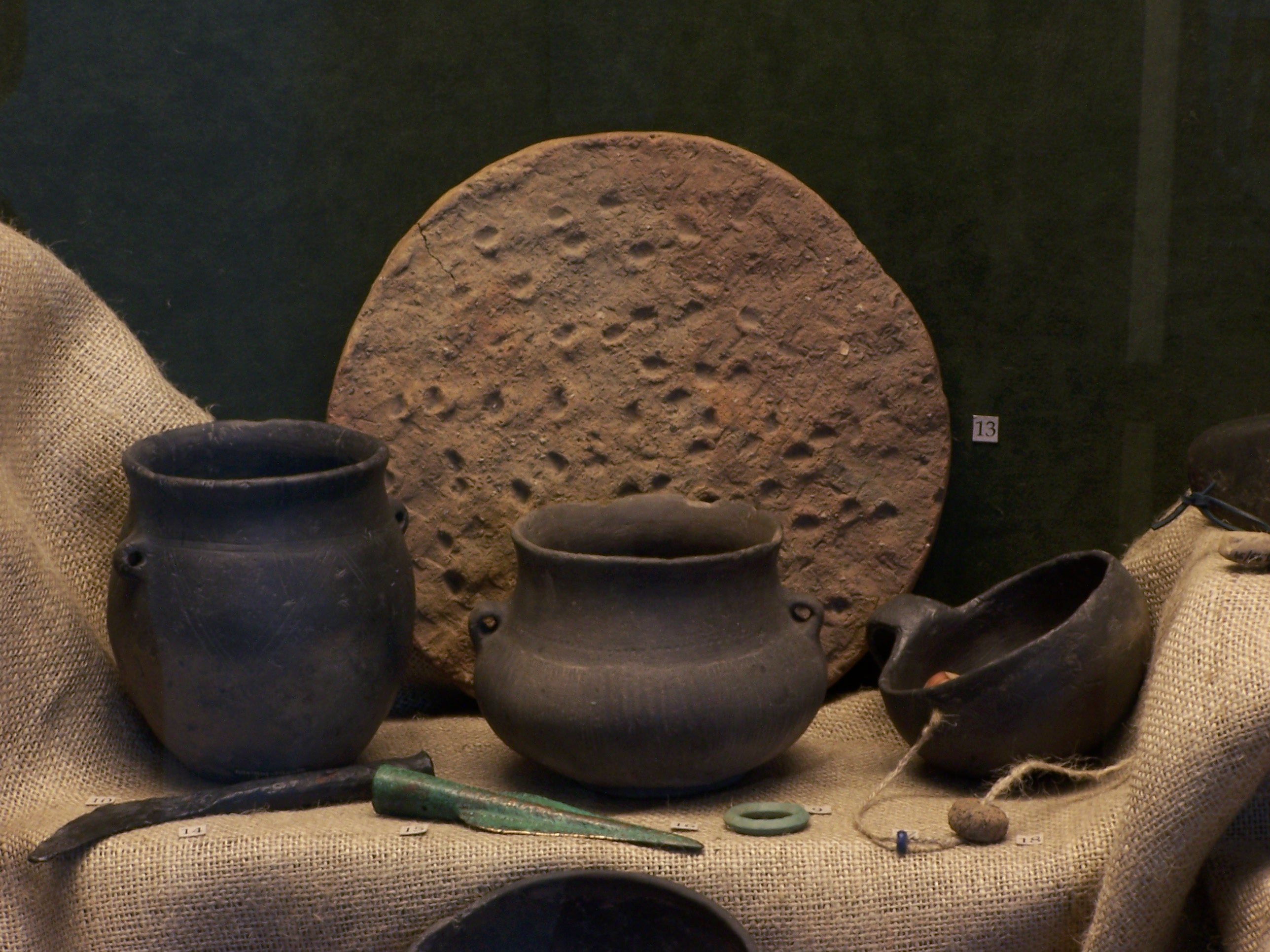
Lusatian culture artifacts at the Bielsko-Biała Museum in Bielsko-Biała. Among the earthenware is the so-called "clay pancake".

The Lusatian culture lasted on Polish lands from 1450 to 250 BC, through the remainder of the Bronze Age (middle and late periods) and then into the Iron Age, from 750 BC on. Although archaeologically it presents itself in a fairly uniform way, it is believed to have been ethnically non-homogeneous, originating in the interplay between groups arriving from outside and populations in existence in Poland, in which new cultural patterns were adopted. The east-west cultural disparity continued: For example, the use of metal objects was less common in the eastern regions, while in the western zone besides the urns the burials contained often many other vessels. The western zone ceramics of the early Lusatian period had very prominent protuberances around the lower part of the container. These regional differences became even more pronounced with time.

A number of smaller Lusatian subcultures are distinguished, such as the one in Upper Silesia, where after a 250-year hiatus, beginning at about 900 BC, atypically for the Urnfield cultural sphere, skeletal burials are found again.

=== Settlements, economic activities, crafts and social organization ===
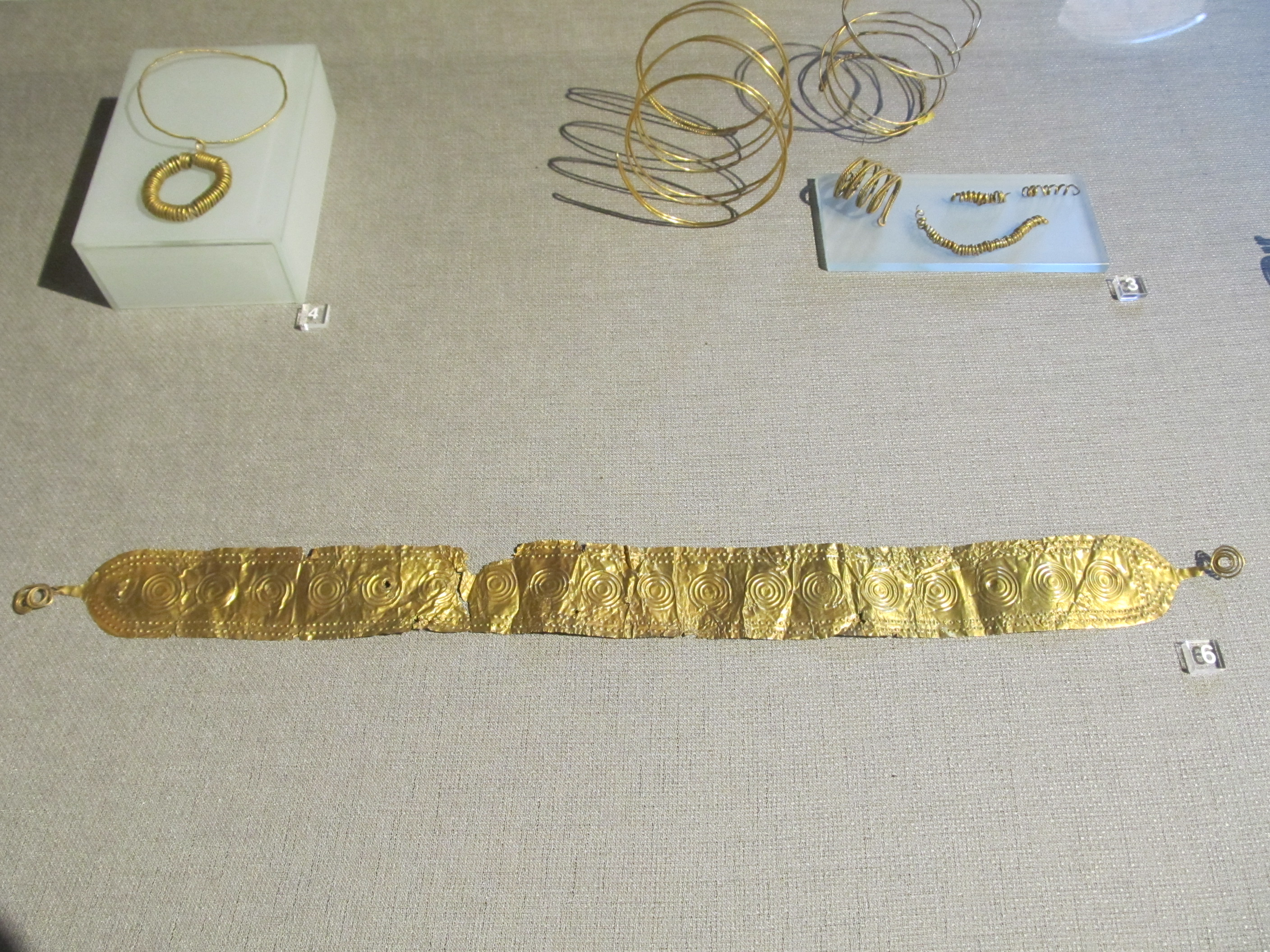
Gold diadem from Sichów, Bronze Age Lusatian culture

Bronze Age Lusatian rural settlements were limited to low-lying areas and until late in this period lacked fortifications or other defensive measures; during these more peaceful times protection was not as essential as in the centuries to follow. The houses were made of beams insulated by clay or moss, supported by poles, with slanting roofs covered by straw or reed. Inside there were hearths, stools, beds, places for economic activity such as metallurgical production shops, vertical looms and hand-operated mills. Some livestock were also kept inside, and some were culled before winter because of insufficient ability to store feed.

The materials used were still wood, horn and bone, and, especially in the eastern zone, stone. Women were commonly engaged in spinning and weaving, for clay weaving implements and workshops were found within the unearthed settlements. Pottery was still produced without the potter's wheel and kilns specialized for baking pots were just making their first appearance. During the late Bronze Age specialized centers manufactured beautifully painted ceramics, much of it for sale. Bronze metallurgy and craftsmanship became also highly developed and acquired locally different styles – luxurious decorative items, tools and arms were made around Legnica and elsewhere in western and southern Poland.

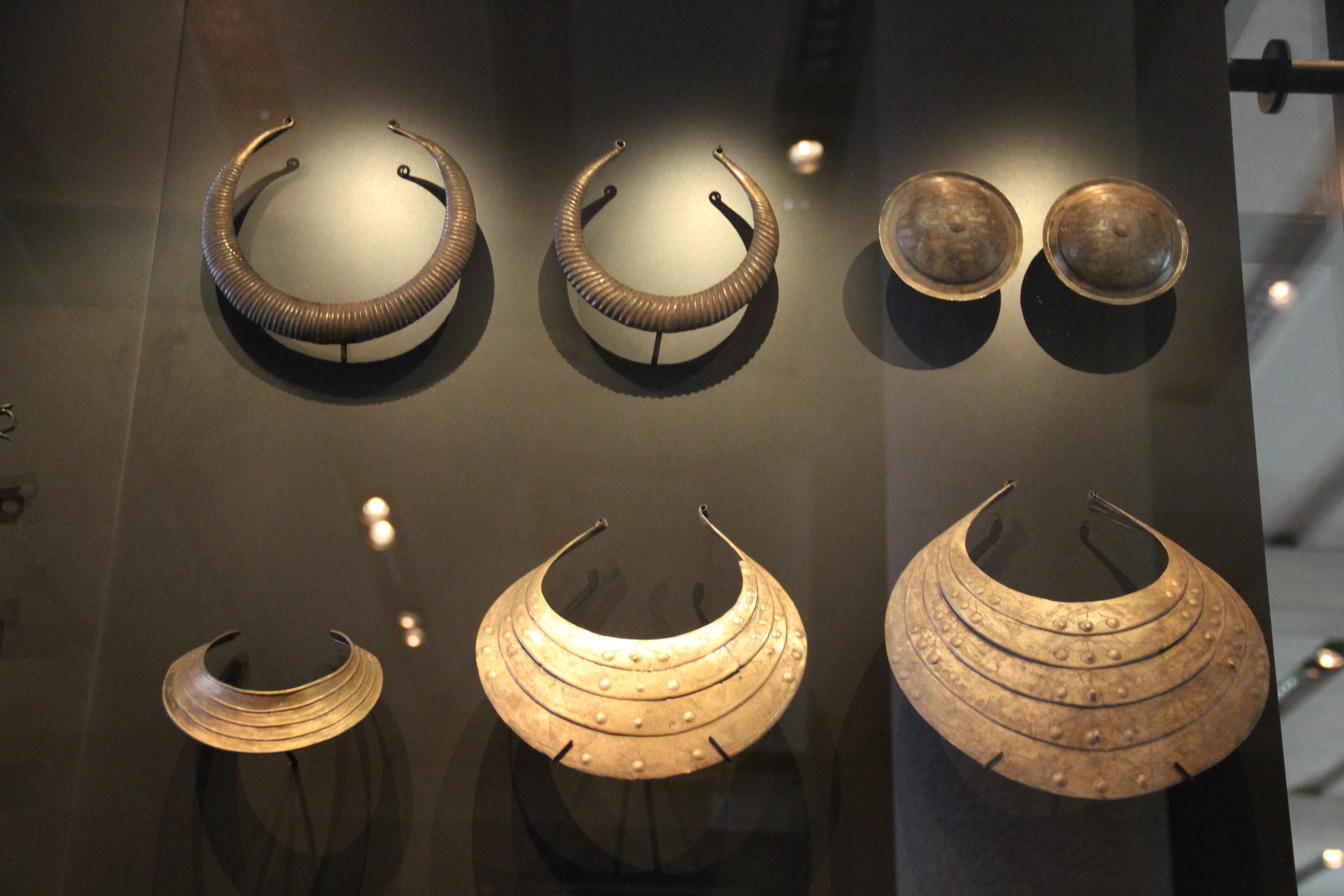
Bronze ornaments of the Lusatian culture from Poland

Lusatian social organization was based on the family and extended family, although early tribal communities may have also been developing. Social, professional and trade groups were gradually forming, including warriors, priests and metallurgists, but there is no evidence of a hereditary ruling class or other social elites.

Lusatian settlements in central Poland (Łódź area) were small (4–5 families) and short-lived, no more than half a century at the same location, probably because the soil was no longer usable after intensive exploitation through a couple of generations. The exception is a huge settlement in Kowalewice, Zgierz County, from the late Bronze Age, lasting into the Hallstatt period.

A treasure of unique in Poland bronze and iron personal ornaments dated 8th century BC, stylistically related to finds from northern as well as southern Europe, was discovered on the edge of a settlement in Aleksandrowice, Kraków County, an area of extensive Lusatian settlement activity.

=== Solar cult and cult related art ===
Many objects recovered by archaeologists are believed to be related to a cult of the sun and the solar deity. Those include ceramics with painted solar images and molded into bird figures, bronze wheeled mini-carts with animal ornaments and bronze clasps with bird images, probably worn as parts of a ceremonial robe by priests-sorcerers. Anthropomorphic figurines and zoomorphic containers and plates related to solar or other forms of cult are found in the Lusatian western zone; they come from the last centuries of the Bronze Age and continue into the Iron Age. Engraved on a vase-urn found in Łazy in Milicz County and dated 850–650 BC are representations of mythical deer-man figures. Some such vessels, jewelry and drawings have their contemporary counterparts in Assyria, ancient Israel, Archaic Greece and Etruria, which shows the breadth of Lusatian trade and other contacts. A panpipe (syrinx), a musical instrument of the type popular in northern Italy and eastern Hallstatt circles, was found in a grave in Przeczyce near Zawiercie from the late bronze or early iron periods.

== Lusatian culture of the early Iron Age ==
=== Changing conditions and regional relations ===
Several factors destabilized the situation at the outset of the Iron Age. Climate cooling caused a degradation of the Asian steppes which forced the nomadic people who lived there to move out and started a chain of consequences – horsemen from the steppe armed with iron weapons were able to penetrate large areas of Europe. The Europeans responded by building large fortified settlements, adopting the warring methods of the Asian invaders, developing a specialized military caste and a strong power system based on a prince-ruler. The Hallstatt culture, which developed west and south of Poland, itself imitating the Mediterranean civilizations and cultivating close contacts with them, turned out to be a major influence on the Lusatian people on Polish lands, whose culture reached its peak during the 750–550 BC period.

Baltic amber was traded in return for weapons and luxurious objects from southern Europe, including fancy personal grooming items such as nail clipping devices, and trade relations with the Nordic area peoples were similarly well developed, notably in western Pomerania, which had increasingly been falling under the Nordic cultural zone (southern Scandinavian Peninsula, Denmark and northern Germany) influence throughout the Later Bronze Age, when its artisans imitated the Nordic imports.

=== Lusatian culture of the Hallstatt periods ===
The Lusatian culture of the Hallstatt periods included most lands of present-day Poland, including the related Białowice culture (Zielona Góra County) in some of the westernmost parts, contemporaneous with Hallstatt C and D and later and credited with the passing of a "cist" (rock encasement) grave type to the Pomeranian culture. Western Poland was more highly developed, with local manufacturing; jewelry and other decorative products made of iron, bronze, glass, amber and other materials as well as luxurious painted ceramics were patterned after the Hallstatt craft. In many graveyards the dead were buried in wooden chambers. The burials found in Gorszewice (Szamotuły County) in Greater Poland (650–550 BC) are supplied with fancy equipment and resemble the graves of the Hallstatt tribal chiefs; similarly there are other treasures of luxurious and prestigious objects.

Large scale excavation of Lusatian settlements influenced by the Alpine region of the Hallstatt culture took place in Wrocław County. There at Stary Śleszów and Milejowice parts of the settlements are separated from the rest by a solid palisade fence, possibly enclosing the dwellings of the emerging local elite. At the Nowy Śleszów settlement a residential and industrial zones could be clearly distinguished, the latter one including kilns for pottery baking and smelting furnaces for ironworks. A necropolis in Domasław functioned from 1300 to 400 BC and over 3000 graves have been discovered there. Over 80 Hallstatt type rich burials are among them. Objects recovered point to extensive trading contacts with the south of the Alps and Mediterranean regions. Because of the evidence acquired, some investigators now believe that the large center in Wrocław County and other early Iron Age settlements in Lower Silesia represent the Hallstatt, rather than Lusatian culture. Despite this apparent fascination with the lifestyles of the western elites (and to some degree creation of their own), the Lusatian people never acquired a comparable level of social stratification and there were no hereditary "princes".

=== Economic activities ===
Agricultural activities remained the mainstay of the economy, supplemented as before by hunting and gathering. Simple wooden scratch-plows were already used, pulled by oxen. Millet, wheat, rye, oats and barley were grown in field systems, while in the gardens bean and lentil were cultivated, as well as oil-producing poppy, turnips and flax, whose fiber made linen thread. Animal husbandry methods improved when iron utensils became more common, that is beginning in the 6th century BC. Horses were bred and utilized more often, in addition to the traditionally kept cattle, swine, sheep and goats, and improved feed storage allowed keeping the herds throughout the winter season. Salt springs were used for salt production. In Wieliczka area in particular salt was being manufactured already during the Bronze Age, with large scale extraction taking place during the Hallstatt periods. In southern Poland the Lusatians tried to exploit the locally available metal ores.

=== Construction of fortified settlements and Scythian invasions ===
Beginning around 900 BC the Lusatian people gradually fortified their settlements, first in the Silesia region. By 650–600 BC there were quite a few of them there and all over the western zone. Often built in locations naturally easy to defend, they were surrounded by walls made of earth, stone and wood, and moats, and could cover anywhere from 0.5 to 20 hectares. Smaller strongholds were built at strategic locations such as mountain passes and trade routes, where the residents could control and police the area. The strongholds also functioned as industrial centers; a good example of a trade-manufacturing fortified settlement is the one in Komorów, located near the Gorszewice cemetery. Some of the large fortified areas didn't have many structures inside and served probably as temporary sanctuaries for the local population at times of danger.

Beginning in the 6th century several waves of Scythian invasions went through the Polish lands. The routes they traveled can be seen from the trail of the burnt-out Lusatian settlements they left. Dramatic material testimony of violent death and destruction was found among the ashes of a perished fortified settlement in Wicina near Nowogród Bobrzański. On the other hand, a golden Scythian treasure was discovered near a Lusatian settlement in Witaszkowo near Gubin – elements of arms and decorations patterned after zoomorphic Greek art motifs and dated 550 BC, probably booty seized from a fallen Scythian chief.

=== Biskupin ===
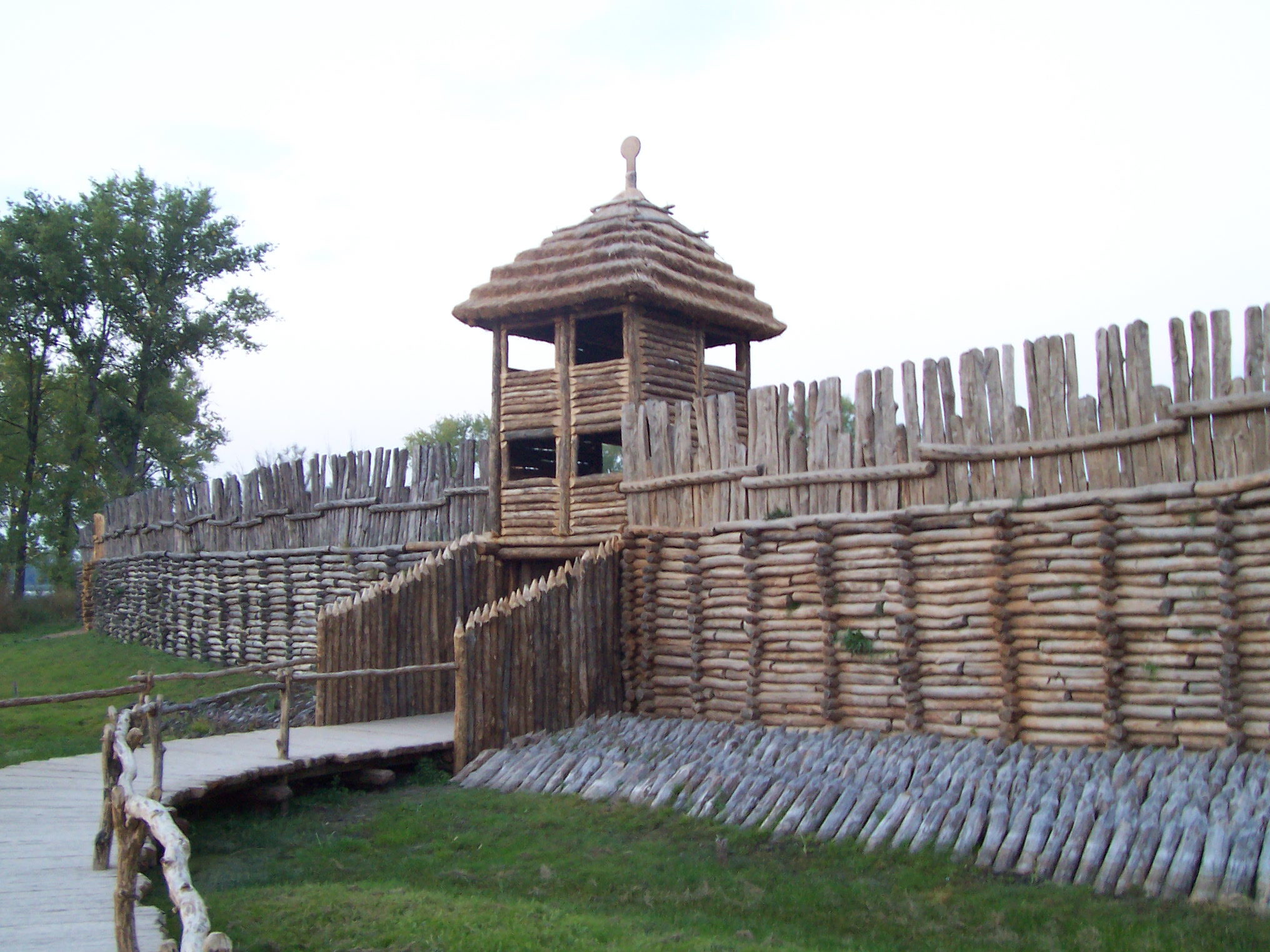
The reconstructed Biskupin fortified settlement. As shown by dendrochronology research, the majority of trees used for the construction were cut in winter of 738/737 BC.

Of a different and far less common type is the famous, very well preserved Biskupin wooden stronghold on the lake, in use from about 750 to 500 BC, when rising water levels forced the inhabitants to abandon the settlement. The houses (almost a hundred, enough to room about one thousand settlers) inside the walls were densely and regularly arranged in long rows. There were eleven parallel streets covered by wood – the whole structure is seen by some as a proto-urban imitation of the Mediterranean cities. But the dwellings were all alike, indicating a lack of significant social distinction within the Lusatian community. This site, central to Polish archaeology, has been under active and intense research since 1934.

The descendants of the Biskupin residents, like of most Lusatian people, were very likely incorporated into the Pomeranian culture, and with it eventually into the Germanic mainstream.

=== Decline of the Lusatian culture ===
In the 5th century the Lusatians stopped building fortified settlements. The Scythian expansion severed their trade links with the Hallstatt societies, while climatic changes damaged their agriculture. All this forced them to disperse and caused disintegration of their social structures. Less developed population from the eastern zone migrated west, highly developed ceramic and metallurgic industries waned, the Pomeranian culture expanded into the previously Lusatian areas. By the 4th century BC the Lusatian culture was for the most part gone, with the last, small populations surviving in western and southern Poland.

== Pomeranian culture, Western Baltic Kurgans culture ==
=== Pomeranian culture ===
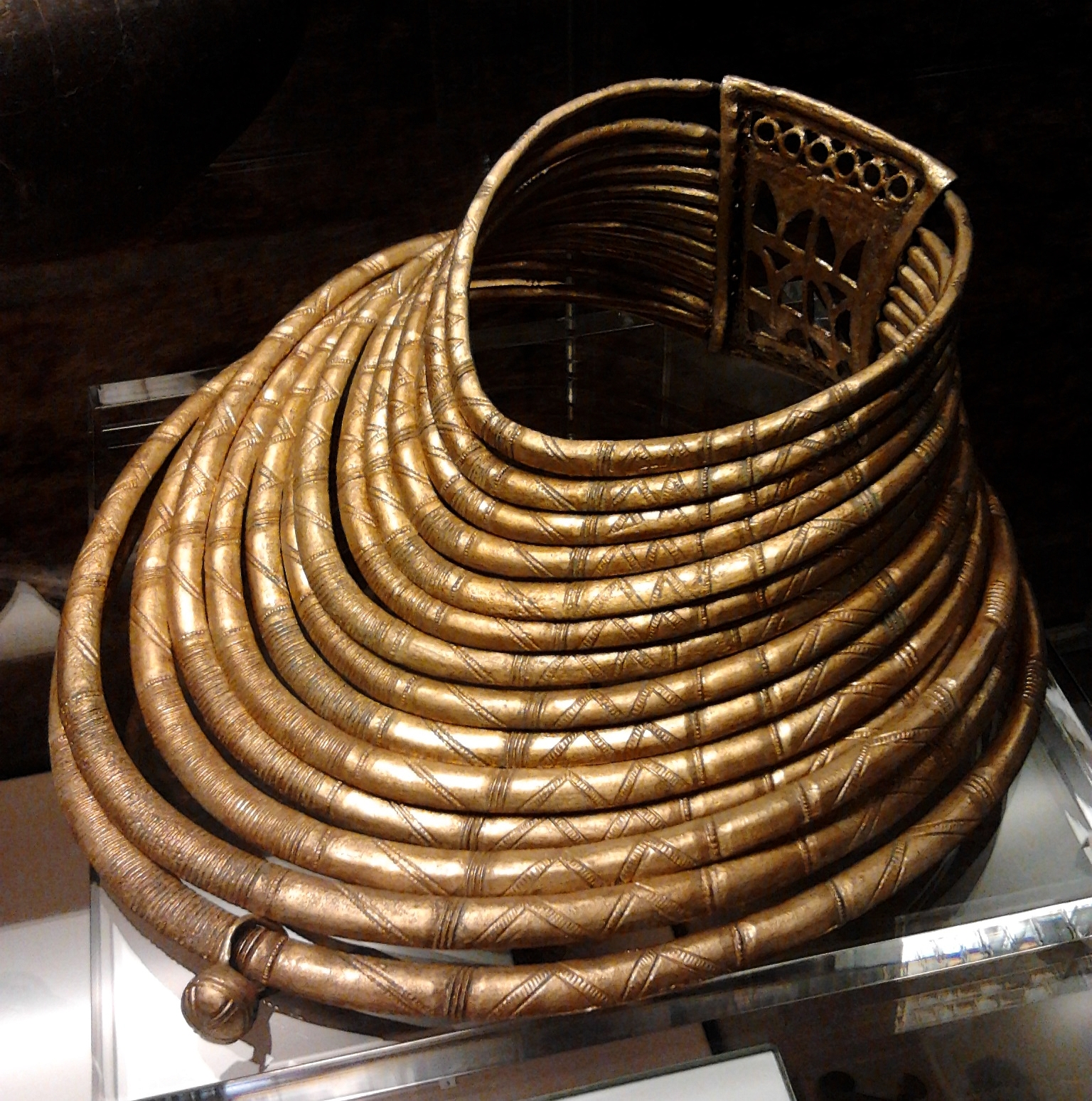
Bronze pectoral from Mrowino, Pomeranian culture

This article's last major culture covering most Polish lands, the Pomeranian culture, developed in the 7th century BC in eastern Pomerania. This region had preserved a distinct cultural identity throughout the middle and late Bronze Age; unlike the rest of the Lusatian lands they kept the custom of raising burial mounds or barrows above the graves. Those were covered by a layer of stones and the urns were placed in a chest, or cist built of rock pieces.

At the outset of the Iron Age the eastern Pomeranians became involved in long distance amber trade that ranged from the Sambian Peninsula, through Pomerania, the Lusatian and Hallstatt lands all the way to Italy. The amber trade gave them access to imported products. At roughly the same time climatic changes favored a rural economy different from that typical of the Lusatian societies. Animal husbandry and the less demanding cereals (rye and barley) became more important, as the villages had to be built at higher altitudes (because of climatically elevated water tables and environmental exploitation of the lowland settlement areas). This in turn favored small communities based on the family and extended family, flexible and capable of greater mobility. All such factors gave the Pomeranian people a competitive advantage over the traditional Lusatian settlements.

=== Pomeranian burials and urns ===
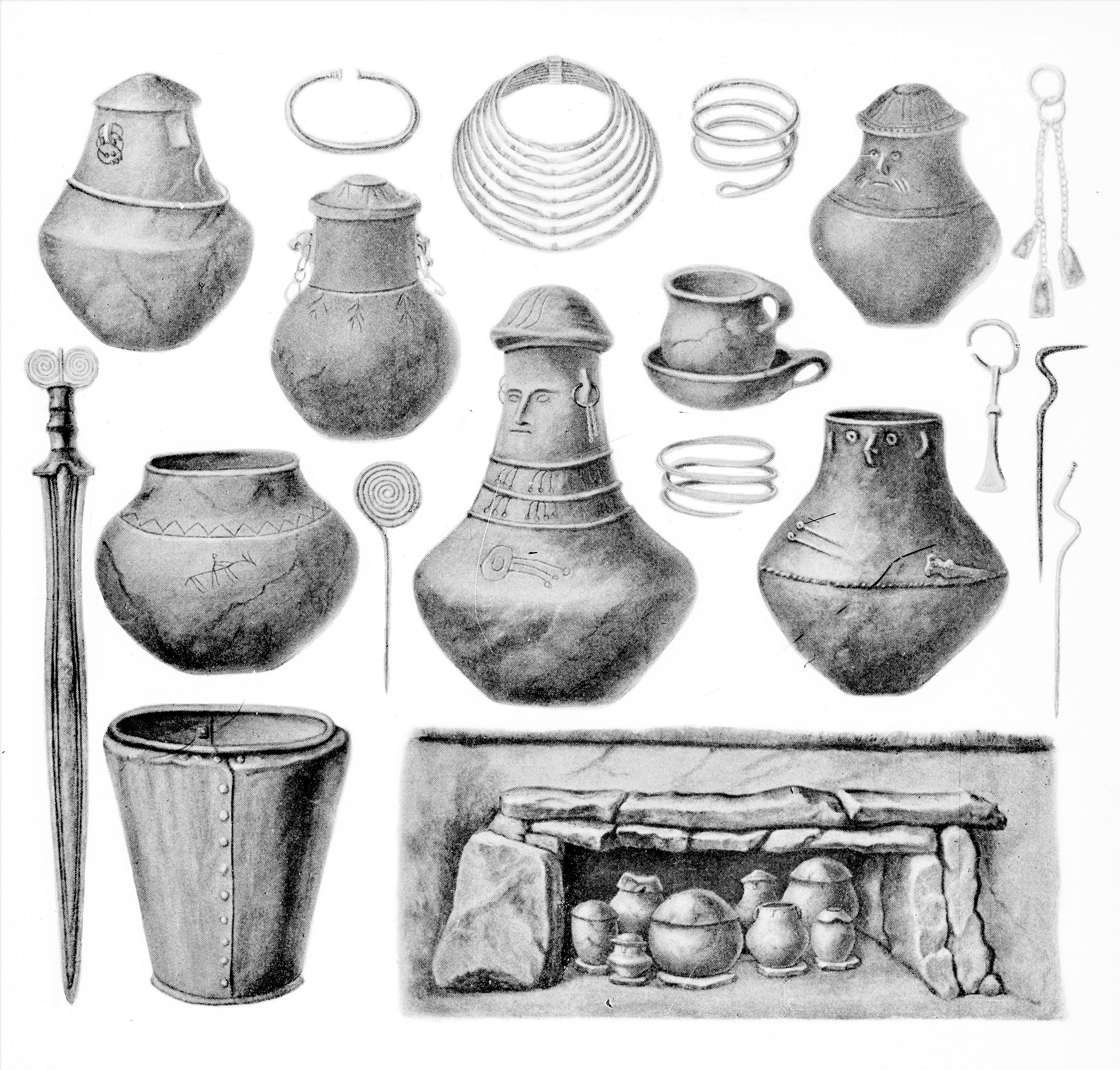
Pomeranian culture artefacts

Accordingly, the large Lusatian urn fields were replaced by small, family size burial sites with several or more urns. The cist graves were now mostly flat, without mounds, forming a rectangle with up to two meter-long sides built of vertical slabs, containing the urns (sometimes as many as thirty and in separate compartments) inside and covered with another slab. Further south and east, as the Pomeranian culture expanded into central and southeastern Poland, there were also burials where the urn was placed under a globe or cloche, that is inside a large, spherical ceramic container, itself sometimes placed in a cist; areas with this arrangement are sometimes recognized as a distinct subculture (Cloche Grave culture). Two types of funerary urns are peculiar to the Pomeranians, house-urns and face-urns. House-urns stand on several legs, have a large opening in front, come from an earlier period, the 7–6th century BC and mostly from the Lębork region. Face-urns from the same period are round, bulging containers with a unique and often realistic image of a face around the neck area and a hat-like lid, while the later ones tend to be less elaborate. Sometimes on the outside they were variously decorated, with tools and toilet accessories placed inside. Face-urns from the 650–450 BC period unearthed in Borucino, Kartuzy County and elsewhere present a rich assortment of engraved narrative scenes. Those include horse-drawn chariots that apparently depict the nightly trips of the sun-god through the underworlds, which symbolically represents the cyclical renewal of life; carts pulled by oxen and representing lunar symbolism are also present. Solar images were placed on the lids. House- and face-urns are believed to represent Etruscan influence.

=== Pomeranian economy ===
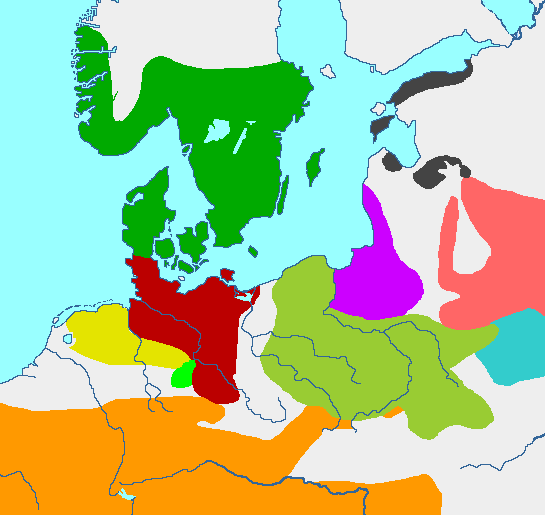
Early Iron Age: Nordic Bronze Age Jastorf culture Harpstedt-Nienburg group Celtic groups Pomeranian culture House urns culture East Baltic culture West Baltic cairns culture Milogrady culture estonic group

Pomeranian rural economy was based on small, open settlements. Their livestock included horses and many dogs. Plowing was done with all wooden (bare) spatula-plows, which required multiple runs. The Pomeranians cultivated several different grains and practiced fishery. Bronze and iron processing became very highly developed. Of the weapons, tools, decorative items and jewelry manufactured, the large bronze necklaces made of many rings, running around the neck and upper chest area, connected by a latticed buckle in the back (600–450 BC) are especially impressive. Advanced bronze metallurgy facilities were found at Juszkowo near Pruszcz Gdański. At Pruszcz itself an amber processing workshop was found – the material used was imported from Sambia. At the iron works material obtained from the local ore deposits (Góry Świętokrzyskie) was most likely used. Another highly developed craft was pottery, which found its highest expression in the above described face-urns.

=== Expansion and decline of the Pomeranian culture ===
The already existing Pomeranian culture expanded further when the Lusatian culture entered the crisis stage. In the 5th century BC major acquisitions took place in the western and southern directions, when northern Silesia and Lesser Poland were taken over. The older Lusatian populations were pushed out or assimilated. The Pomeranians themselves were changing in the process, either as a result of encountering new environmental conditions, or because of being influenced by the Lusatian people (face-urns for example disappeared here). In the 3rd century the Pomeranian culture in its original form mostly vanished, with regional enclaves only surviving till the middle of the 2nd century BC.

=== Western Baltic Kurgans culture ===
The Western Baltic Kurgans culture existed in Masuria, Warmia, Sambia and northern Masovia during the 650–50 BC period. It originated partially from the people who migrated there from the Dnieper River area and assimilated elements of the Warmian-Masurian Lusatian branches (themselves preceded by the middle Bronze Age Sambian Kurgans culture), as well as of the old forest zone cultures. They were related in a number of ways, including funeral vessels, to their contemporary, the Pomeranian culture. Upon radial stone structures they built burial mounds – kurgans, or barrows, some of them quite large and containing a number of individual burials. A large kurgan site from the 3rd century BC was located and investigated in Piórkowo in Braniewo County. The dead were cremated and the ashes placed in urns. They built small fortified settlements at naturally suitable places, such as hilltops, and characteristically, within shallow bodies of water, which involved sinking logs and special pile construction. Underwater exploration allowed a conceptual reconstruction of such settlement (3rd–2nd century BC) on Orzysz Lake near Orzysz in Pisz County. The Western Baltic Kurgans economy was traditional, based on animal husbandry (herds kept in a semi-wild state). Land tilling was done to a lesser extent and only later in this culture's history. Hunting, fishing and gathering were also important. Tool manufacturing was old-fashioned, mostly non-metallic. Ceramic containers often had round (semi-spherical) bottoms and modest punctured or engraved ornamentation. The Western Baltic Kurgans culture is the predecessor culture of the Western Balt culture (cultural sphere of Western Baltic tribes), which developed during the first several centuries AD.

== See also ==
- Prehistory of Poland (until 966)
- Stone Age Poland
- Poland in Antiquity
- Poland in the Early Middle Ages
- Nordic Bronze Age
- Hallstatt culture
- Pre-Roman Iron Age

== Notes ==
a. The Trzcinica site is being restored and developed as The Carpathian Troy Open-Air Archaeological Museum

== =Sources ==
- Marek Derwich and Adam Żurek (eds), U źródeł Polski (do roku 1038) (Foundations of Poland (until year 1038)), Wydawnictwo Dolnośląskie, Wrocław 2002, ISBN 83-7023-954-4
- Piotr Kaczanowski, Janusz Krzysztof Kozłowski – Najdawniejsze dzieje ziem polskich (do VII w.) (Oldest history of Polish lands (until the 7th century)), Fogra, Kraków 1998, ISBN 83-85719-34-2
