= Słubice County =

Słubice County Powiat słubicki
- County
- Flag Coat of arms

- Location within the voivodeship
- Coordinates (Słubice): 52°21′N 14°34′E
- Country: Poland
- Voivodeship: Lubusz
- Seat: Słubice
- Gminas: Total 5: Gmina Cybinka; Gmina Górzyca; Gmina Ośno Lubuskie; Gmina Rzepin; Gmina Słubice

Area
  - Total: 999.77 km^{2} (386.01 sq mi)

Population (2019-06-30)
  - Total: 47,018
  - Density: 47.029/km^{2} (121.80/sq mi)
  - Urban: 29,934
  - Rural: 17,084
- Car plates: FSL
- Website: http://www.powiatslubicki.pl

Słubice County (Polish: powiat słubicki) is a unit of territorial administration and local government (powiat) in Lubusz Voivodeship, western Poland, on the German border. It came into being on January 1, 1999, as a result of the Polish local government reforms passed in 1998. Its administrative seat and largest town is Słubice, which lies 63 km (39 mi) south-west of Gorzów Wielkopolski and 79 km (49 mi) north-west of Zielona Góra. The county contains three other towns: Rzepin, lying 19 km (12 mi) east of Słubice, Ośno Lubuskie, lying 25 km (16 mi) north-east of Słubice, and Cybinka, 24 km (15 mi) south-east of Słubice.

The county covers an area of 999.77 square kilometres (386.0 sq mi). As of 2019 its total population is 47,018. The most populated towns are Słubice with 16,705 inhabitants and Rzepin with 6,529 inhabitants.

== Neighbouring counties ==
Słubice County is bordered by Gorzów County to the north, Sulęcin County to the east and Krosno County to the south. It also borders Brandenburg in Germany to the west.

== Administrative divisions ==
The county is subdivided into five gminas (four urban-rural and one rural). These are listed in the following table, in descending order of population.

Gmina	Type	Area (km^{2})	Population (2019)	Seat
Gmina Słubice	urban-rural	185.4	20,061	Słubice
Gmina Rzepin	urban-rural	191.1	9,745	Rzepin
Gmina Cybinka	urban-rural	279.7	6,492	Cybinka
Gmina Ośno Lubuskie	urban-rural	198.0	6,426	Ośno Lubuskie
Gmina Górzyca	rural	145.6	4,294	Górzyca
