= 16th century BC =

One hundred years, from 1600 BC to 1501 BC

The 16th century BC was a century that lasted from 1600 BC to 1501 BC.

== Events ==
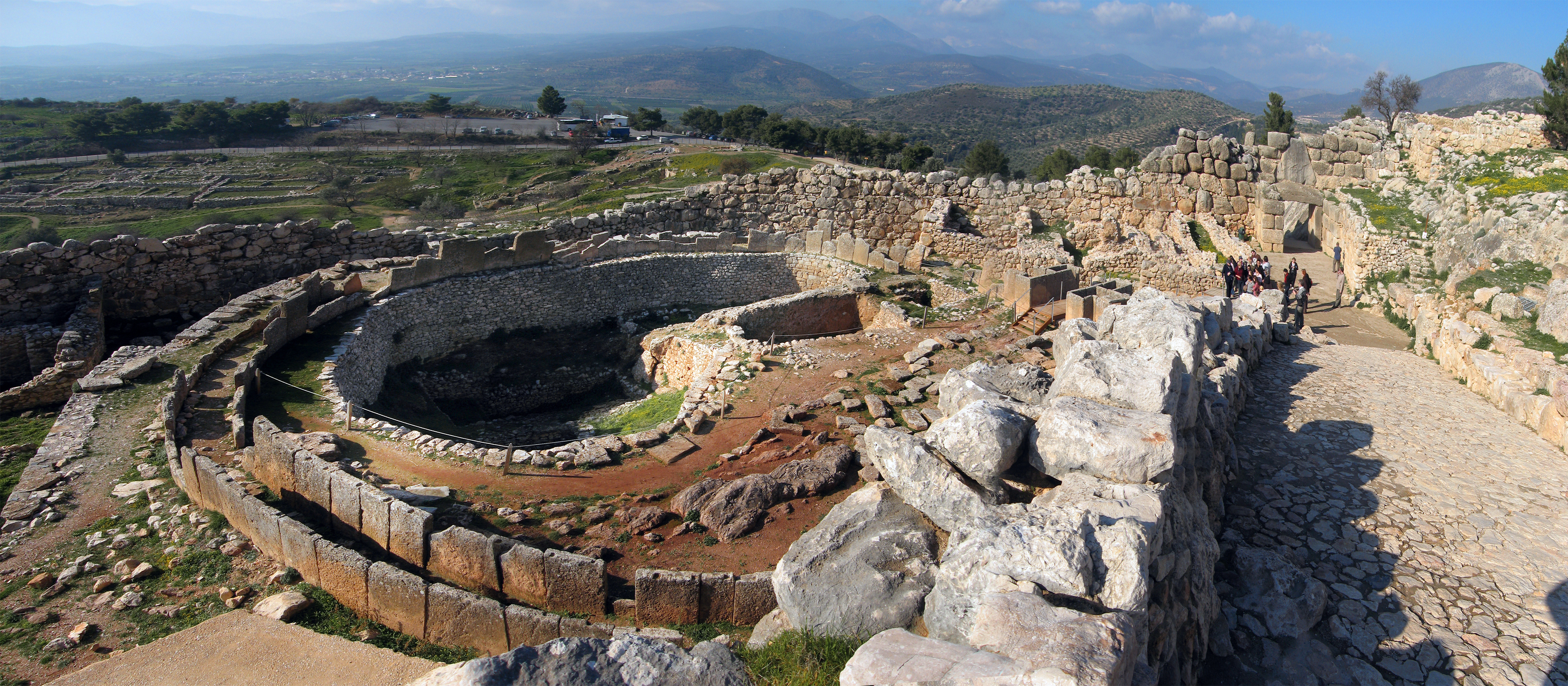
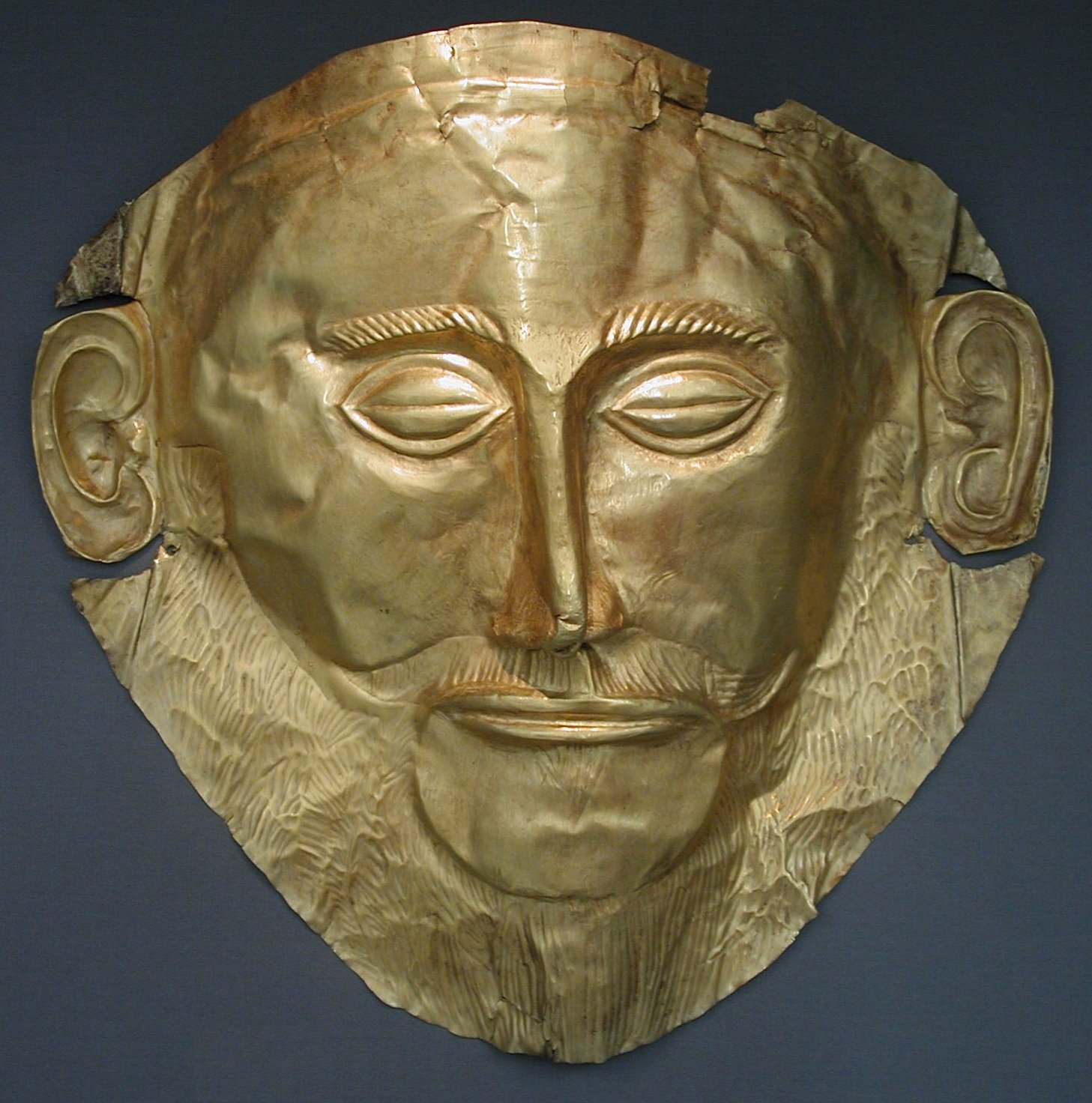
The royal Grave Circle in Mycenae, Greece (left) and the 'Mask of Agamemnon' (right) found in one of the graves.
- 1700 BC – 1500 BC: Hurrian conquests.
- 1601 BC: Sharma-Adad II became the King of Assyria.
- c. 1600 BC: The creation of one of the oldest surviving astronomical documents, a copy of which was found in the Babylonian library of Ashurbanipal: a 21-year record of the appearances of Venus (which the early Babylonians called Nindaranna): Venus tablet of Ammisaduqa.
- c. 1600 BC: The date of the earliest discovered rubber balls.
- c. 1600 BC: Early Mycenaean culture: weapons, Cyclopean walls, and chariots.
- c. 1600 BC: Unetice culture ends in Czech Republic, eastern Europe
- Development of the windmill in Persia.
- c. 1600 BC: Building of El morro del tulcán Pyramid in Colombia.
- 1595 BC: Sack of Babylon by the Hittite king Mursilis I.
- c. 1595 BC: The overthrow of the ruling Amorite dynasty in Aleppo, Syria.
- 1570 BC: Cretan palaces at Knossos and other centres flourish despite disasters.
- 1567 BC: Egypt: End of Fifteenth Dynasty, end of Sixteenth Dynasty, end of Seventeenth Dynasty, start of Eighteenth Dynasty.
- 1558 BC: Shang dynasty of China established (according to the Bamboo Annals).
- 1556 BC: Cecrops I builds or rebuilds Athens following the great flood of Deucalion and the end of the Golden age. He becomes the first of several Kings of Athens whose life account is considered part of Greek mythology.
- c. 1550 BC: The city of Mycenae, located in the northeast Peloponnesus, comes to dominate the rest of Achaea, giving its name to Mycenaean civilization.
- 1550 BC: End of Seventeenth dynasty of Egypt, start of the Eighteenth Dynasty upon the coronation of Ahmose I (Low Chronology).
- 1530 BC: End of the First Dynasty of Babylon and the start of the Kassite dynasty—see History of Iraq.
- 1525 BC: End of Fifteenth Dynasty of Egypt.
- c. 1512 BC: The flood of Deucalion, according to O'Flaherty, Augustine, Eusebius, and Isidore (bishop of Seville).
- 1506 BC: Cecrops I, legendary King of Athens, dies after a reign of 50 years. Having survived his own son, he is succeeded by Cranaus.
- 1504 BC: Egypt started to conquer Nubia and the Levant.
- c. 1500 BC: Many scholars date early parts of the Rig Veda to roughly the 16th century.
- c. 1500 BC: Queen Hatsheput in Egypt (18th Dynasty).
- c. 1500 BC: The element Mercury has been discovered in Egyptian tombs dating from this decade.
- c. 1500 BC: Settlers from Crete, Greece move to Miletus, Turkey.
- c. 1500 BC: Early traces of Maya civilization developing in Belize.
- c. 1500 BC: The Phoenicians develop an alphabet—see Timeline of communication technology.
- c. 1500 BC: Indo-Aryan migration is often dated to the 17th to 16th centuries.
- c. 1500 BC: Birth of Zoroaster (Avestan: Zarathushtra).

== Sovereign states ==
See: List of sovereign states in the 16th century BC.
