= 1600s BC (decade) =

Decade

The 1600s BC was a decade lasting from January 1, 1609 BC to December 31, 1600 BC.

== Events and trends ==
- Egypt—End of Fourteenth Dynasty.
- The creation of one of the oldest surviving astronomical documents, a copy of which was found in the Babylonian library of Ashurbanipal: a 21-year record of the appearances of Venus (which the early Babylonians called Nindaranna).
- The end of the Indus Valley civilization.
- The overthrow of the ruling Amorite dynasty in Aleppo, Syria.
- The date of the earliest discovered rubber balls.
- Egypt conquered by Asian tribes known as the Hyksos—see History of ancient Israel and Judah.
- 1600 BC—Shang dynasty instituted in China.
- 1600 BC—Tumulus culture started.
- c. 1600 BC—Nebra skydisk created in what is now Germany.
- c. 1600 BC—The foundations of the Olmec civilization in southern Mexico.
- c. 1600 BC—Cycladic civilization ends.
- c. 1600 BC–1550 BC—"Mask of Agamemnon" Funerary mask, from the royal tombs at Mycenae, Greece, is made. Grave Circle A. It is now at National Archaeological Museum of Athens.
- c. 1600 BC–1200 BC—Hittite (Anatolia) iron tools and weapons.
- c. 1600 BC – 1200 BC—Tiryns, Ancient Greece, is inhabited.
- c. 1600 BC—Kings and princes on the mainland Greece have begun building large aboveground burial places commonly referred to as beehive tombs because of their rounded, conical shape.
- c. 1600 BC—Hittites establish capital at Hattusa (near modern Boğazkale, Turkey).

== Significant people ==
- 1602 BC—Death of Shem, son of Noah, according to the Hebrew Calendar
