= Morro del Tulcán =

Pyramid in Colombia

Coordinates: 2°26′40″N 76°36′00″W

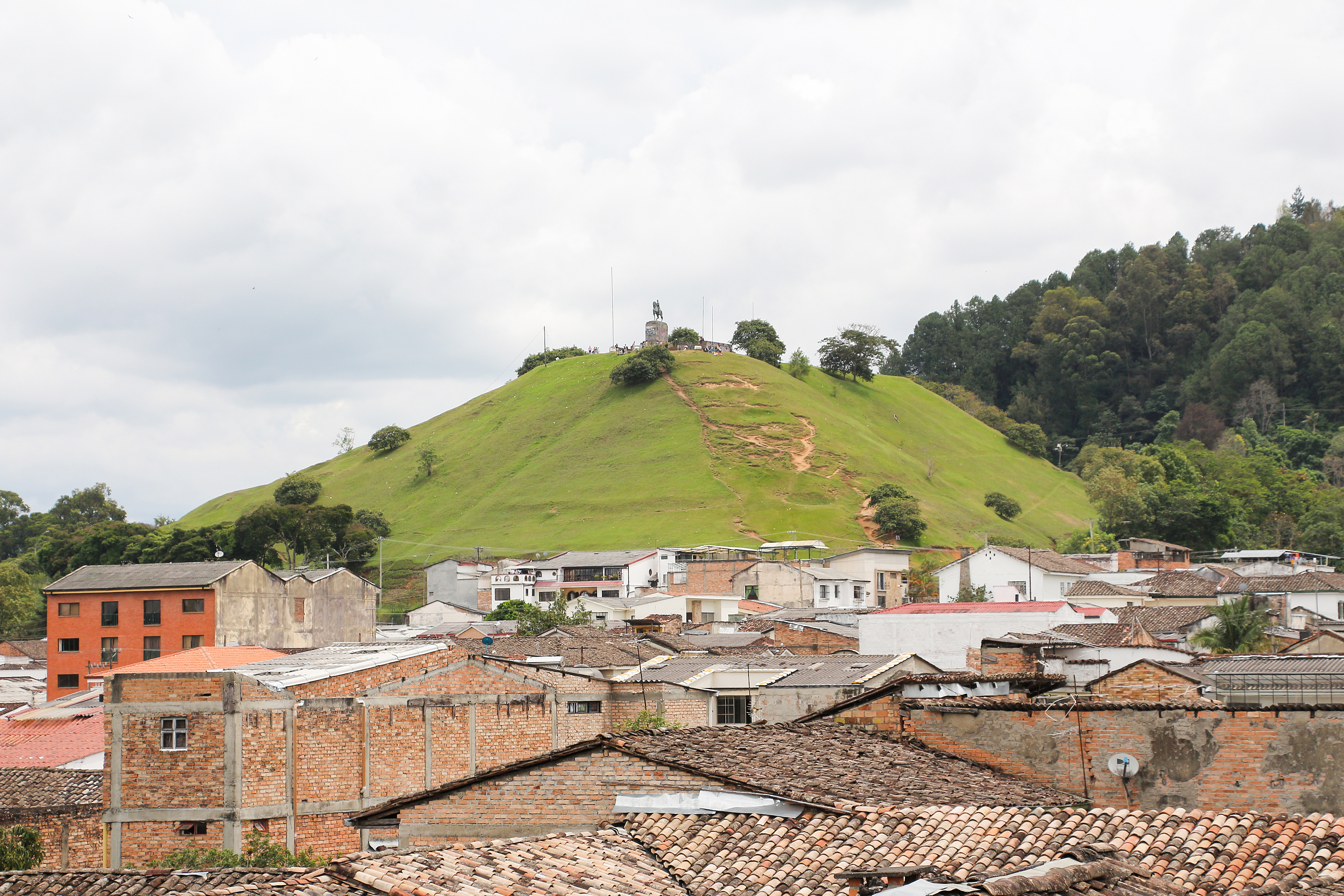
El Morro del Tulcán

El Morro del Tulcán (lit. Tulcán Hill) is an Indigenous pyramid in Popayán, Colombia.

The pyramid was constructed in the pre-Columbian period, approximately between 1600–500 BCE; the period which is now known as "Late Chieftain Societies". On this pyramid a statue dedicated to the Conquistador Sebastián de Belalcázar existed from 1937 to 2020.

== Archaeological excavations ==
During archaeological excavations carried out in 1957 by Hernán Cubillos, director of the Ethnological Institute of the University of Cauca, during that time it was determined that the site "was a special formation, whose cover material is made up mainly of lateritic clays". The indigenous people had built this pre-Hispanic pyramid with clay adobes and filled with earth for the celebration of funeral rites. The author indicated that "the structure was manifested occasionally through a detachment of the superficial layer that revealed some species of adobes".

The top of the structure was decapitated and the walls that determined it disappeared with the start of several works around the hill, generating in its wake, the destruction of the "pre-Hispanic cuspid shaped top". According to Cubillos, this occurred around 1940 when the municipality celebrated the fourth centenary of foundation of the city of Popayan, "the leveling of the hill was carried out, in order to create a platform to place the equestrian statue of the conquistador Sebastián de Belalcázar on that site and carry out ornamentation work".

The Morro de Tulcán as it is known throughout the world is visited by thousands of people who can see from the platform imposed there the city in population growth but little is known that "the cut part destroyed two walls that determined it, according to the evidence obtained in our excavations were artificial and also made of adobe and filler". Today, the hill is deforested and superficially covered with "natural grass or kikuyu grass" replacing the natural shrubby vegetation of the time.

According to Londoño (2011), the dating of this pre-Hispanic pyramid is still to be determined with more precision, as well as the realization of more archaeological investigations, as that of Cubillos is the only official investigation that has been made. Political events occurred in September 2020 led to the demolition of the Spanish monument, as a result the University of Cauca announced that the archaeological studies in the area would be resumed, as a way of symbolic restitution.

== Photographs of Excavations ==
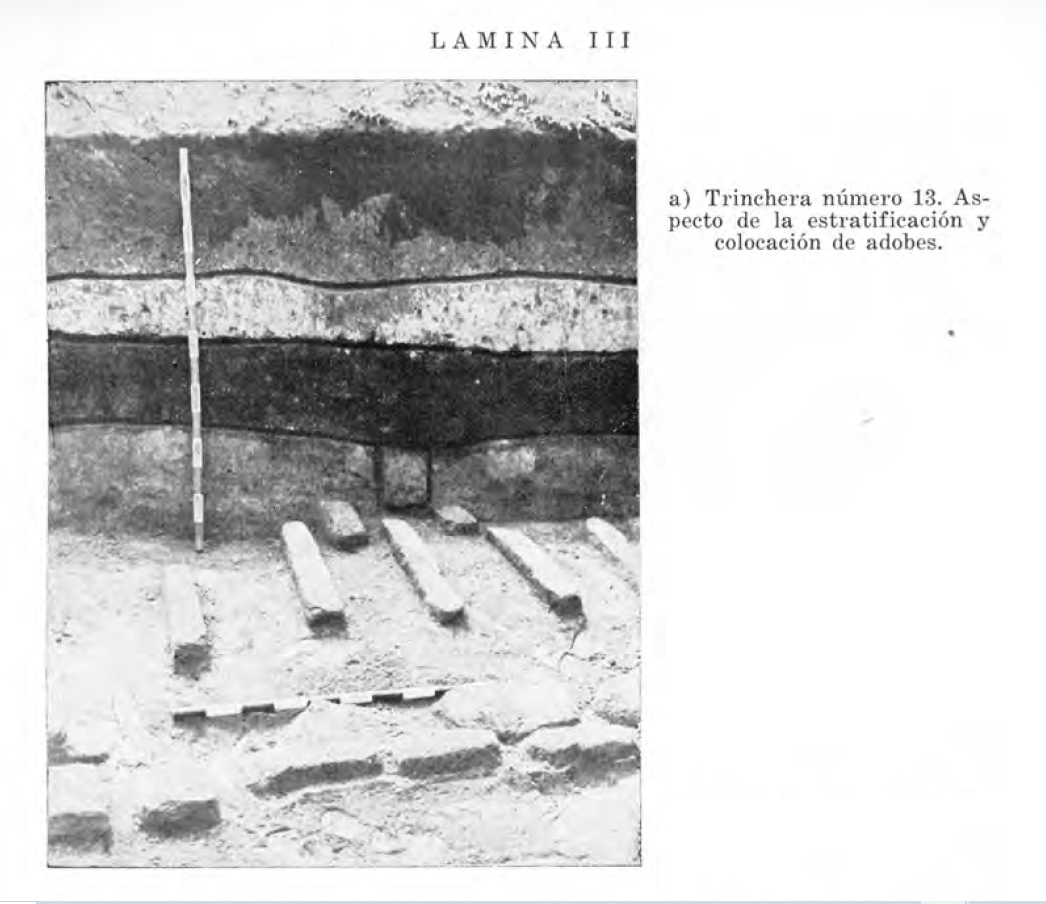
Aspect of the stratification and placement of adobes

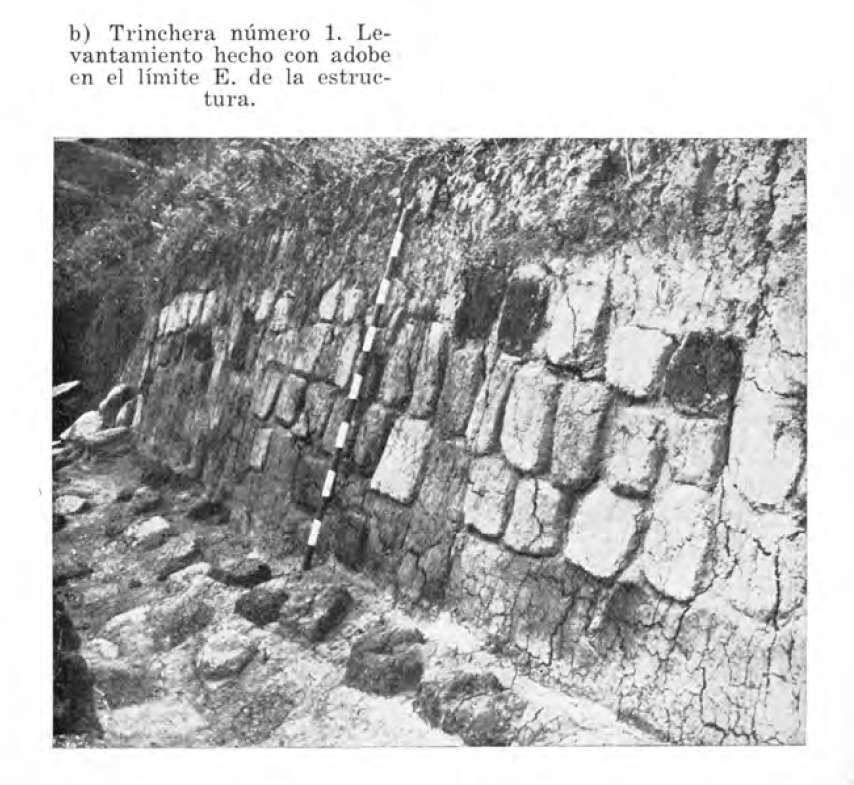
Raising made with adobe on the eastern limit of the structure

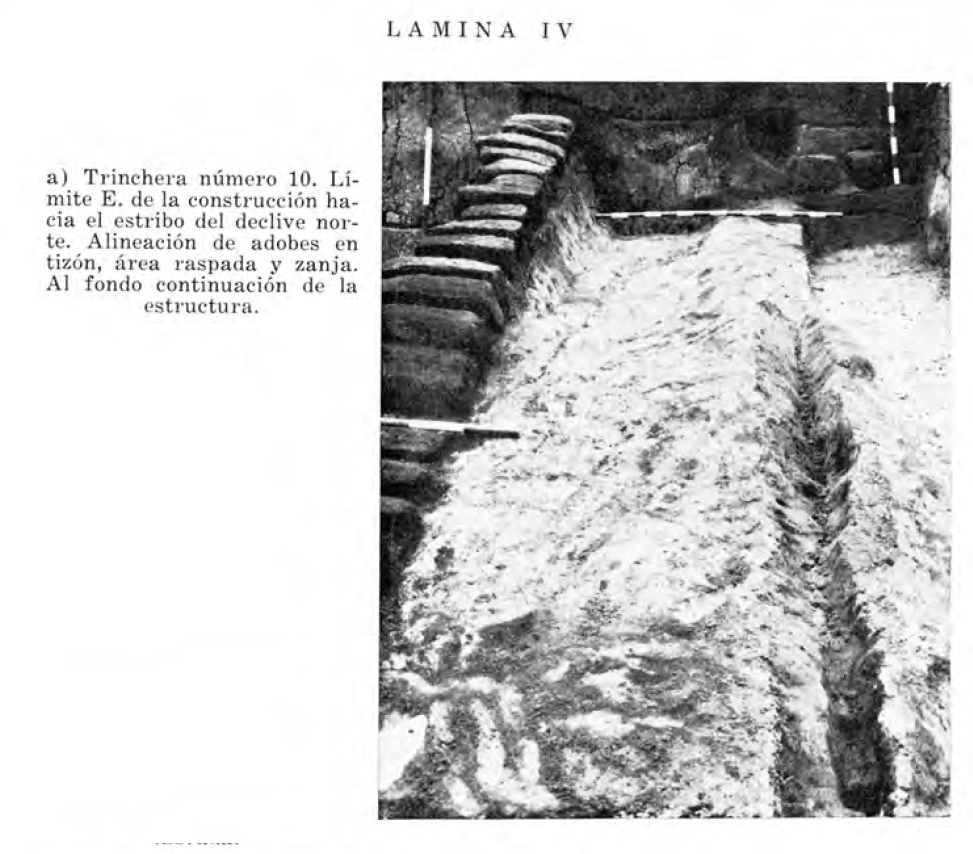
Eastern limit of the construction towards the abutment of the north slope. Alignment of adobes in tizón, scraped area and ditch. In the background the continuation of the structure

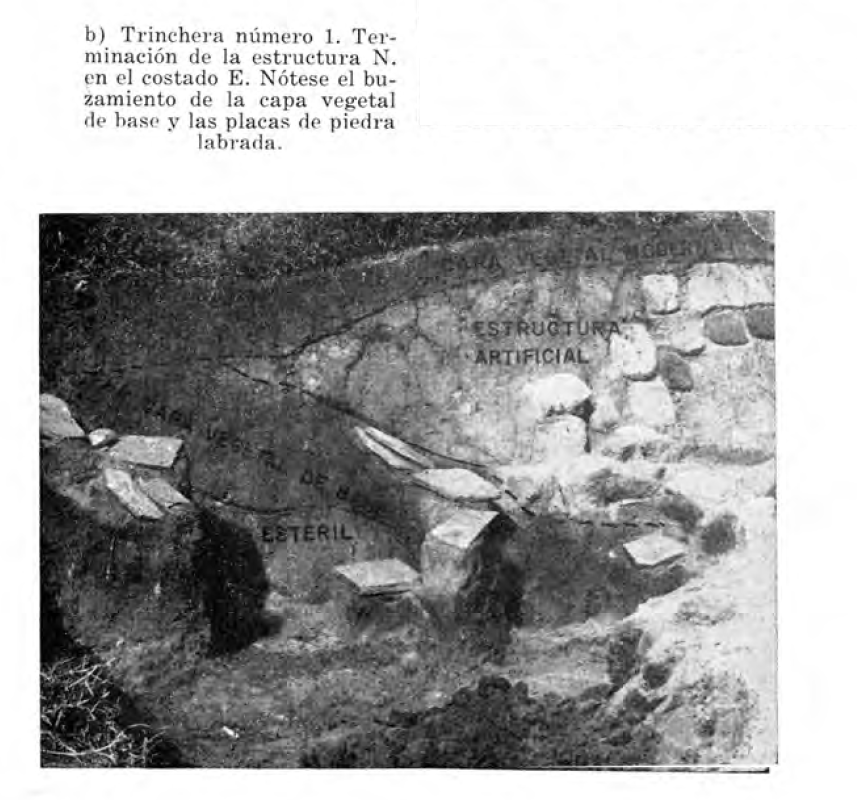
End of the north structure on the east side. Note the dipping of the organic base layer and the carved stone plates

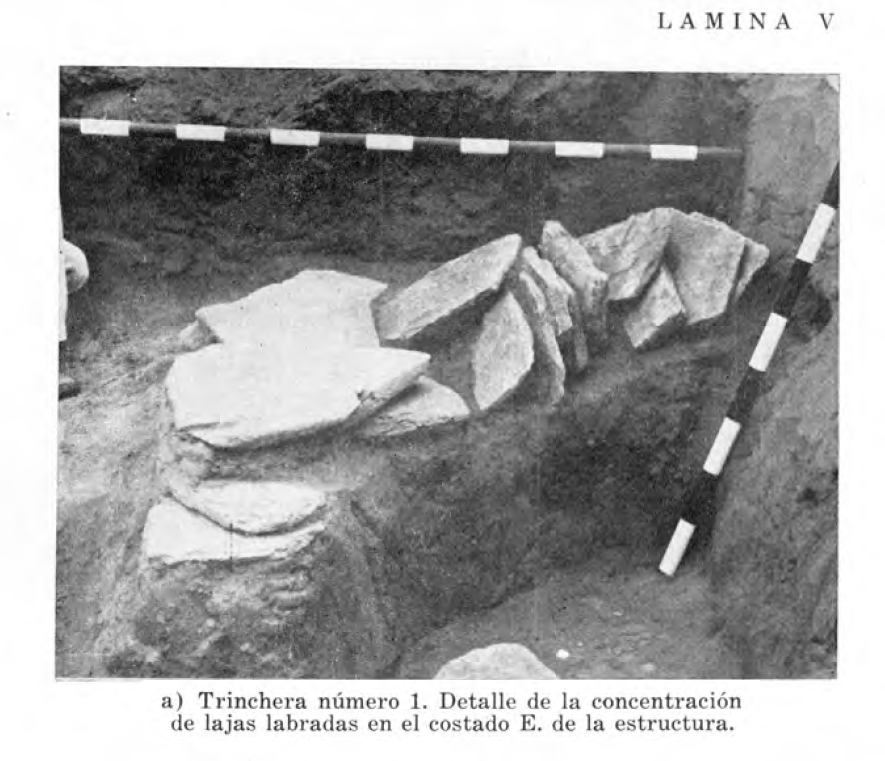
Detail of the concentration of carved slabs on the east side of the structure

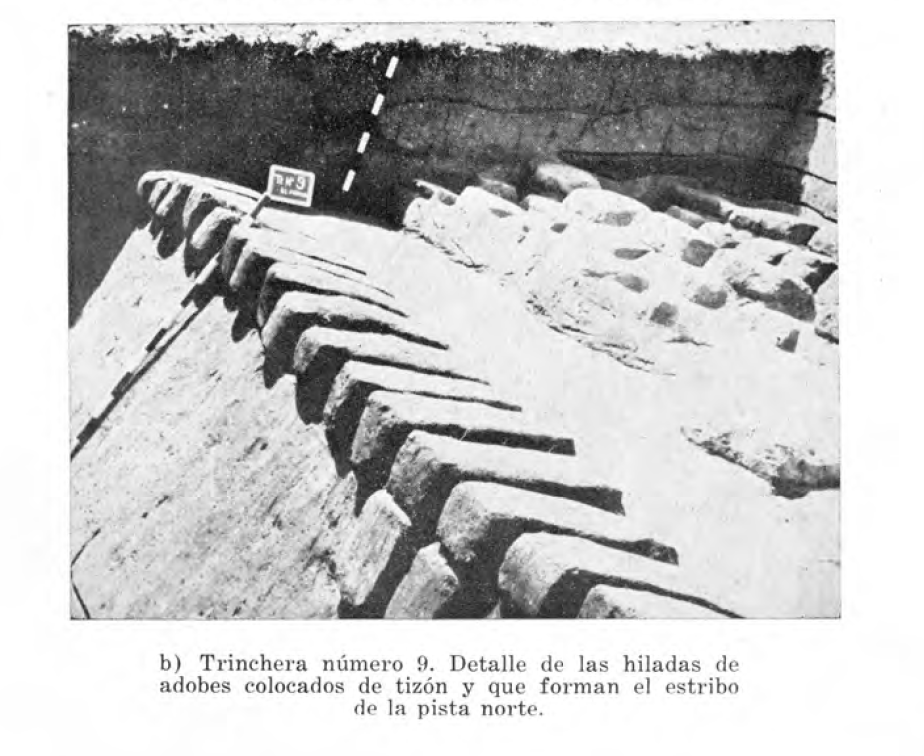
Detail of the concentration of adobe courses placed with tizon and that form the abutment of the north track
