= Tumulus culture =

Prehistoric European culture characterized by burial mounds

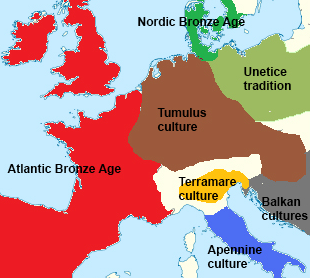
- Geographical range: Central Europe
- Period: Middle Bronze Age
- Dates: c. 1600–1200 BC
- Preceded by: Únětice culture, Ottomány culture, Rhône culture, Mad'arovce culture, Encrusted Pottery culture
- Followed by: Urnfield culture, Lusatian culture

Central European Bronze Age
Late Bronze Age
Ha B2/3	950–800 BC
Ha B1	1050–950 BC
Ha A2	1100–1050 BC
Ha A1	1200–1100 BC
Bz D	1300–1200 BC
Middle Bronze Age
Bz C2	1400–1300 BC
Bz C1	1500–1400 BC
Bz B	1600–1500 BC
Early Bronze Age
Bz A2	2000–1600 BC
Bz A1	2300–2000 BC

The Tumulus culture (German: Hügelgräberkultur) was the dominant material culture in Central Europe during the Middle Bronze Age (c. 1600 to 1300 BC).

It was the descendant of the Unetice culture. Its heartland was the area previously occupied by the Unetice culture, and its territory included parts of Germany, the Czech Republic, Austria, Switzerland, the Carpathian Basin, Poland and France. It was succeeded by the Late Bronze Age Urnfield culture and part of the origin of the Italic and Celtic cultures.

== Artefacts and characteristics ==
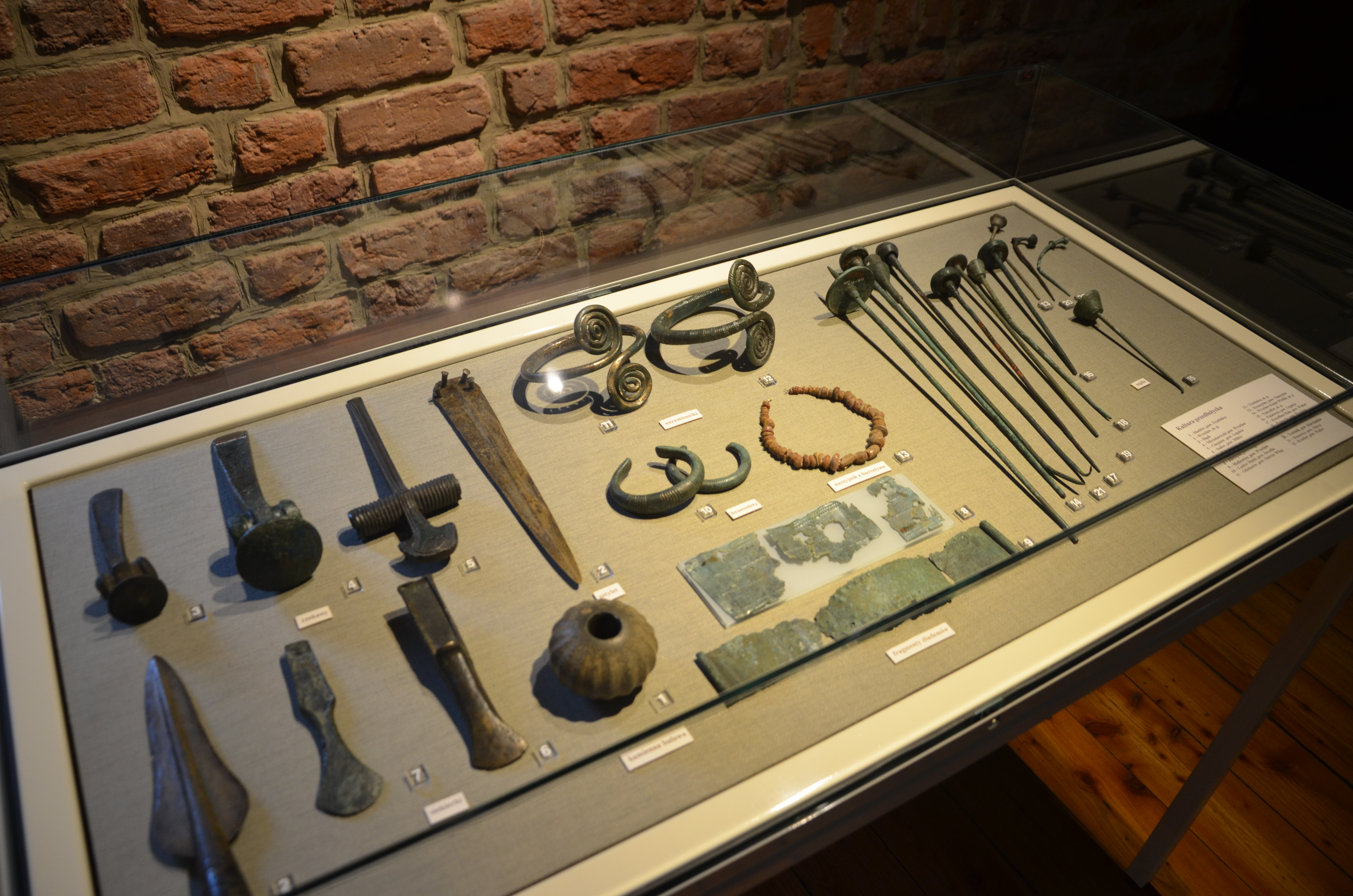
Tumulus culture artefacts from Silesia, Poland, 16th-14th century BC

The Tumulus culture is distinguished by the practice of burying the dead beneath burial mounds (tumuli or kurgans).

In 1902, Paul Reinecke distinguished a number of cultural horizons based on research of Bronze Age hoards and tumuli in periods covered by these cultural horizons are shown in the table below (right). The Tumulus culture was prevalent during the Bronze Age periods B, C1, and C2. Tumuli have been used elsewhere in Europe from the Stone Age to the Iron Age; the term "Tumulus culture" specifically refers to the South German variant of the Bronze Age. In the table, Ha designates Hallstatt. Archaeological horizons Hallstatt A–B are part of the Bronze Age Urnfield culture, while horizons Hallstatt C–D are the type site for the Iron Age Hallstatt culture.

The Tumulus culture was eminently a warrior society, which expanded with new chiefdoms eastward into the Carpathian Basin (up to the river Tisza), and northward into Polish and Central European Únětice territories.

Some scholars see Tumulus groups from southern Germany as corresponding to a community that shared an extinct Indo-European linguistic entity, such as the hypothetical Italo-Celtic group that was ancestral to Italic and Celtic. This particular hypothesis, however, conflicts with suggestions by other Indo-Europeanists. For instance, David W. Anthony suggests that Proto-Italic (and perhaps also Proto-Celtic) speakers could have entered Northern Italy at an earlier stage, from the east (e.g., the Balkan/Adriatic region).

== Culture ==
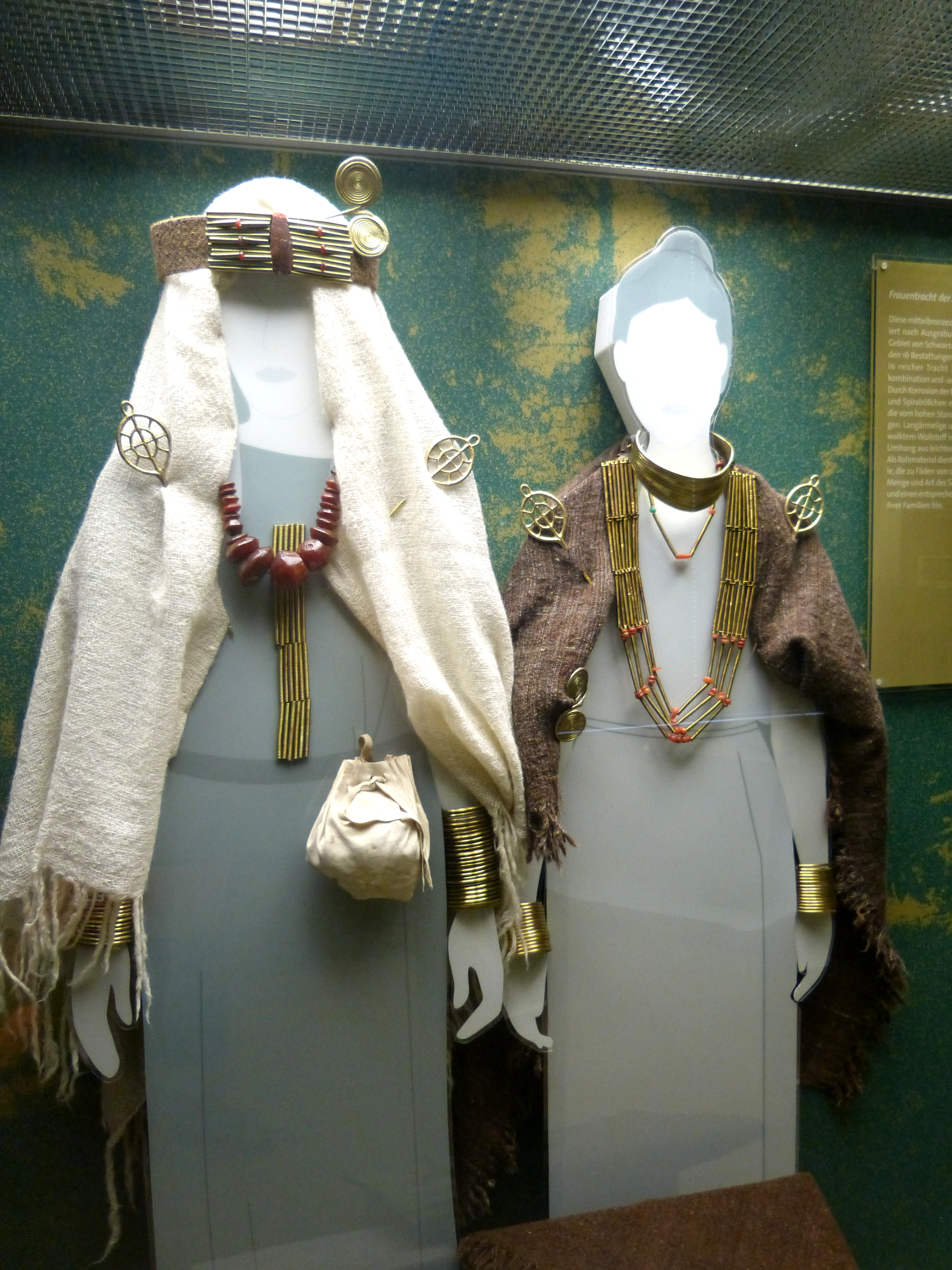
Women's attire from Schwarza, Germany, c. 1500 BC (reconstruction)

=== Settlements ===
The culture's dispersed settlements consisted of villages or homesteads centered on fortified structures such as hillforts. Significant fortified settlements include the Heuneburg, Bullenheimer Berg, Ehrenbürg, Heidenschanze and Bernstorf. Fortification walls were built from wood, stone, and clay. The massive 3.6m-wide wall surrounding the plateau of the Ehrenbürg resembled later murus gallicus fortifications known from the Iron Age. 'Cyclopean' stone fortifications topped with wooden battlements were constructed c. 1400 BC at the large hillfort of Stätteberg in Bavaria.

=== Trade ===
Tumulus culture societies traded with those in Scandinavia, Atlantic Europe, the Mediterranean region and the Aegean. Traded items included amber and metal artefacts. From the beginning of the Middle Bronze Age there is evidence for the use of weighed metal as form of payment or money. Weighing equipment has been found in central Europe dating from c. 1400 BC onwards.

=== Metalwork ===
The Bronze Hand of Prêles from Switzerland, dating from the 16th-15th century BC, is a unique find from the Tumulus culture period. Described as "the earliest metal representation of a human body part ever found in Europe", it may have been a ritual object, or mounted on a standard like similar metal hands known from the Iron Age, or possibly a prosthesis. It was found in a grave along with a bronze hair-ring, pin and dagger. The hand had a golden bracelet or cuff decorated with solar motifs.

=== Calendar ===
Golden hats from Schifferstadt in Germany and Avanton in France, dating from the late Tumulus period (c. 1400 BC), may have been worn by elite religious figures, described as 'oracles' or 'king-priests' by researchers. The patterns of ornaments or symbols on the hats are thought to represent calendars, as on the later and more elaborate Berlin Gold Hat, which may encode knowledge of the luni-solar Metonic cycle. Some researchers have suggested that a Venus calendar is encoded on the Schifferstadt hat and later Ezeldorf and Berlin gold hats. Gold discs from the Czech Republic, dating from c. 1650-1250 BC, feature similar ornaments and are thought to represent simpler calendars. Identical 'ritual objects' from Haschendorf in Austria and Balkåkra in Sweden may also date from the Middle Bronze Age and have been interpreted as solar calendars. Simple numerals on the objects in the form of lines and dots represent assembly instructions for the objects. Similar 'counting marks' were also used by craftsmen in the production of swords. The repeated use of numbers 10, 20, 30 in the construction of the Balkåkra and Haschendorf objects suggests the use of a ten-digit system.

== Gallery ==
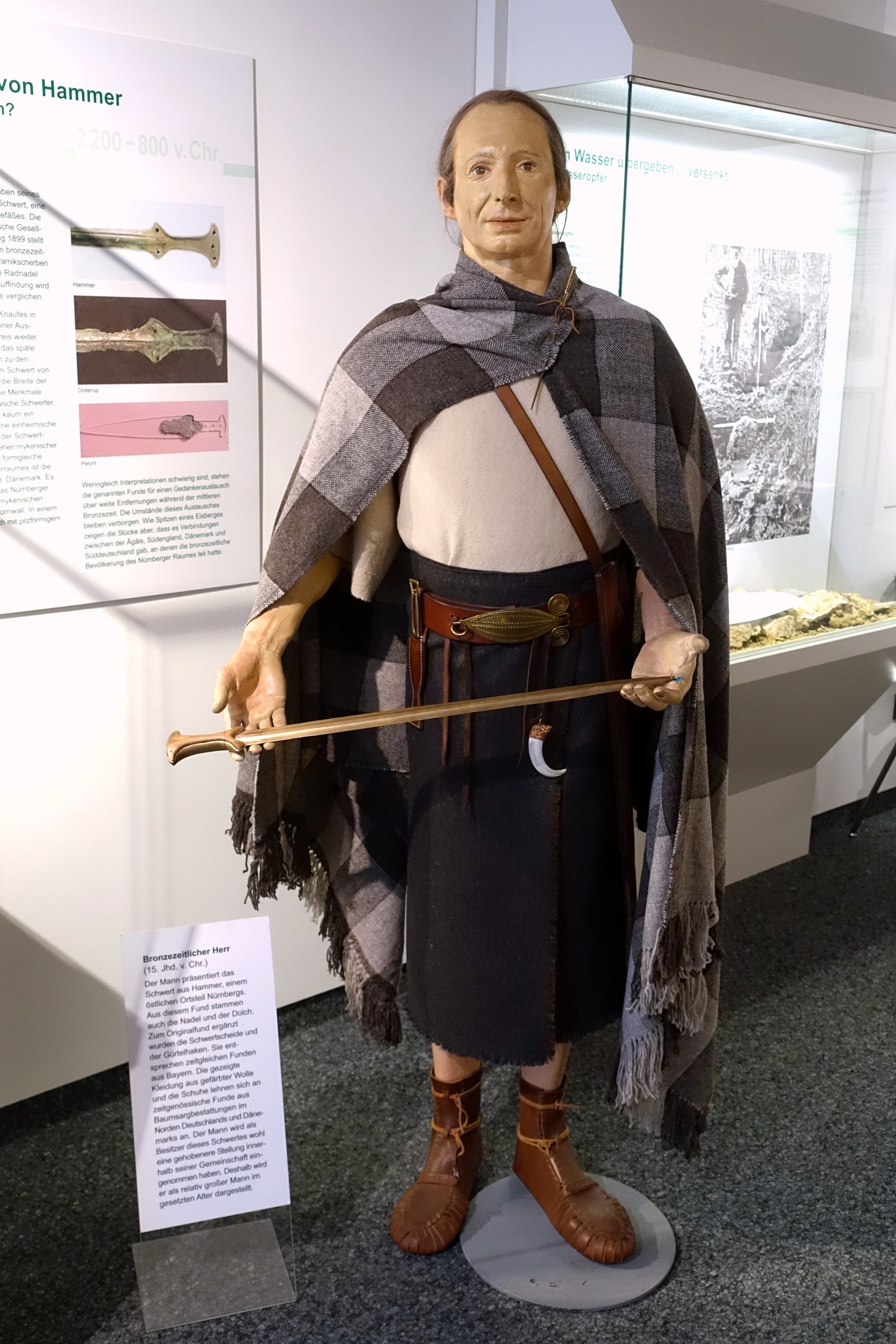
Bronze Age dress, 15th century BC, Germany

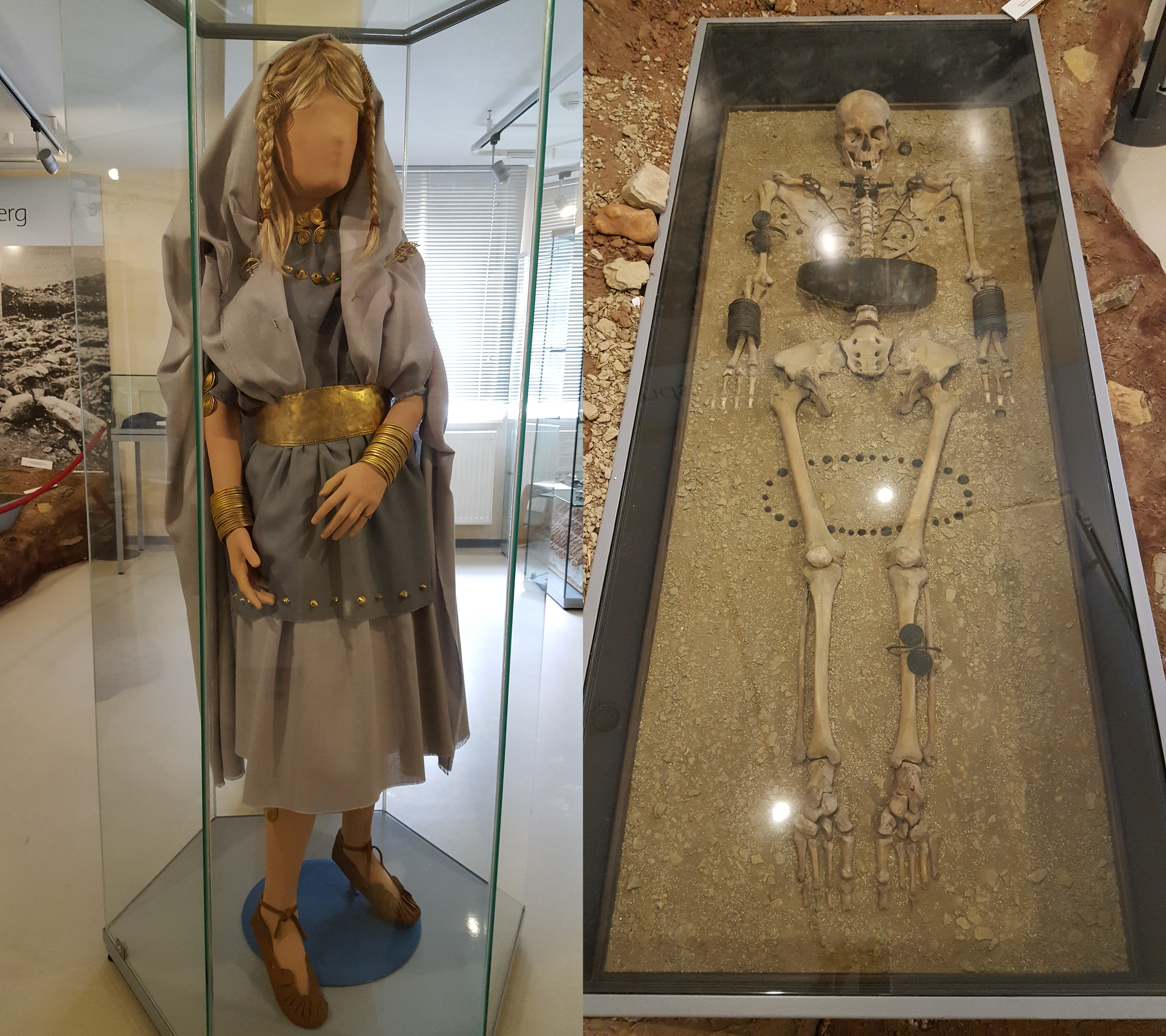
The Girl from Molzbach, Germany, c. 1300 BC

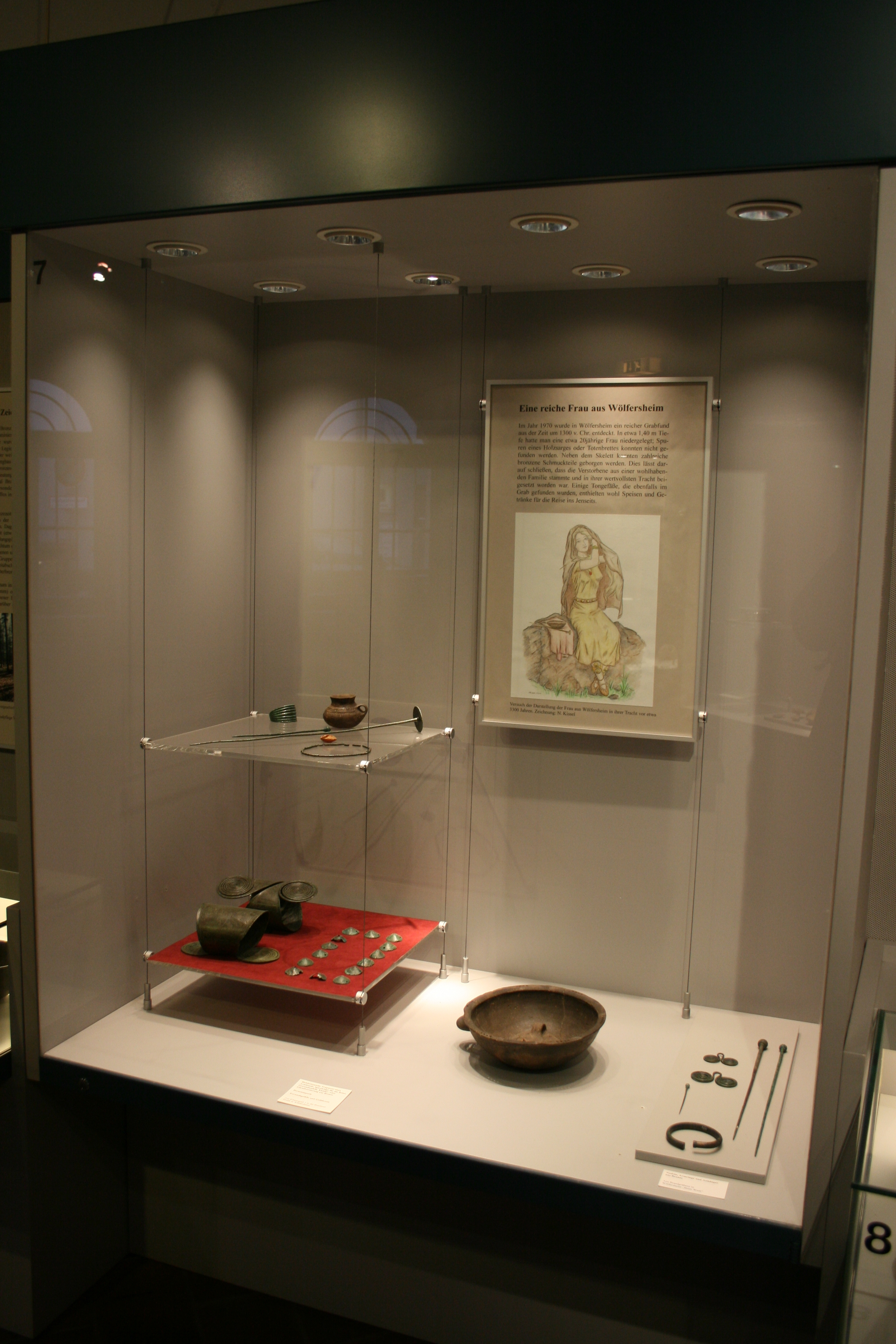
Grave goods from Wölfersheim, Germany

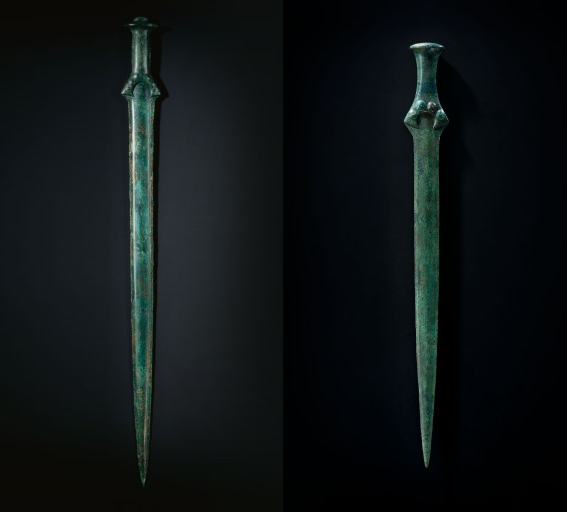
Bronze swords, 1600-1400 BC

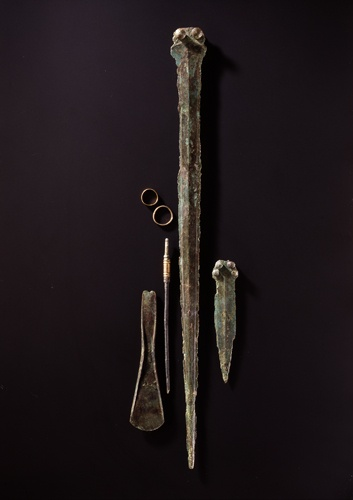
Burial goods, 1400 BC

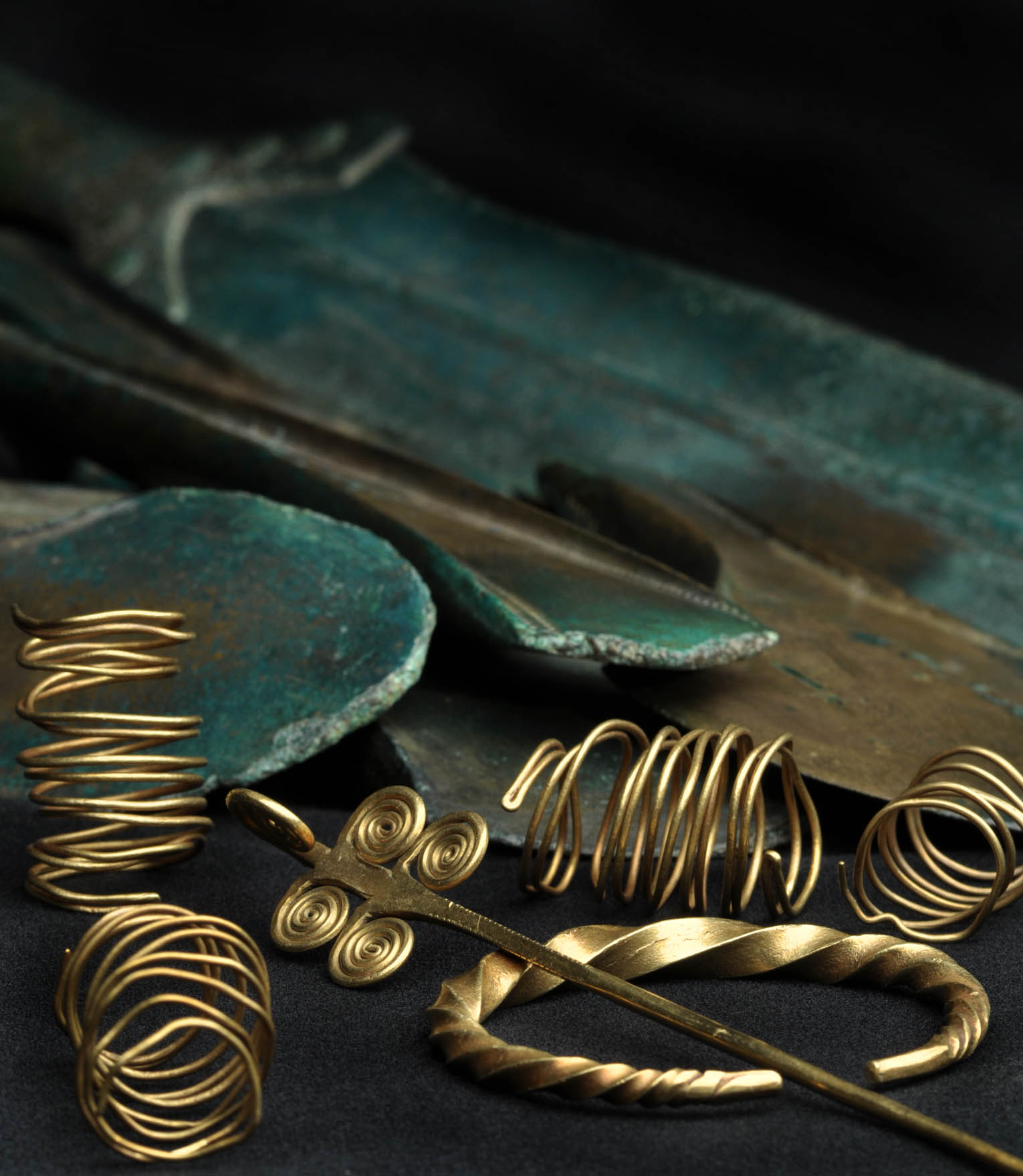
Bronze & gold items, Germany, c. 1600 BC

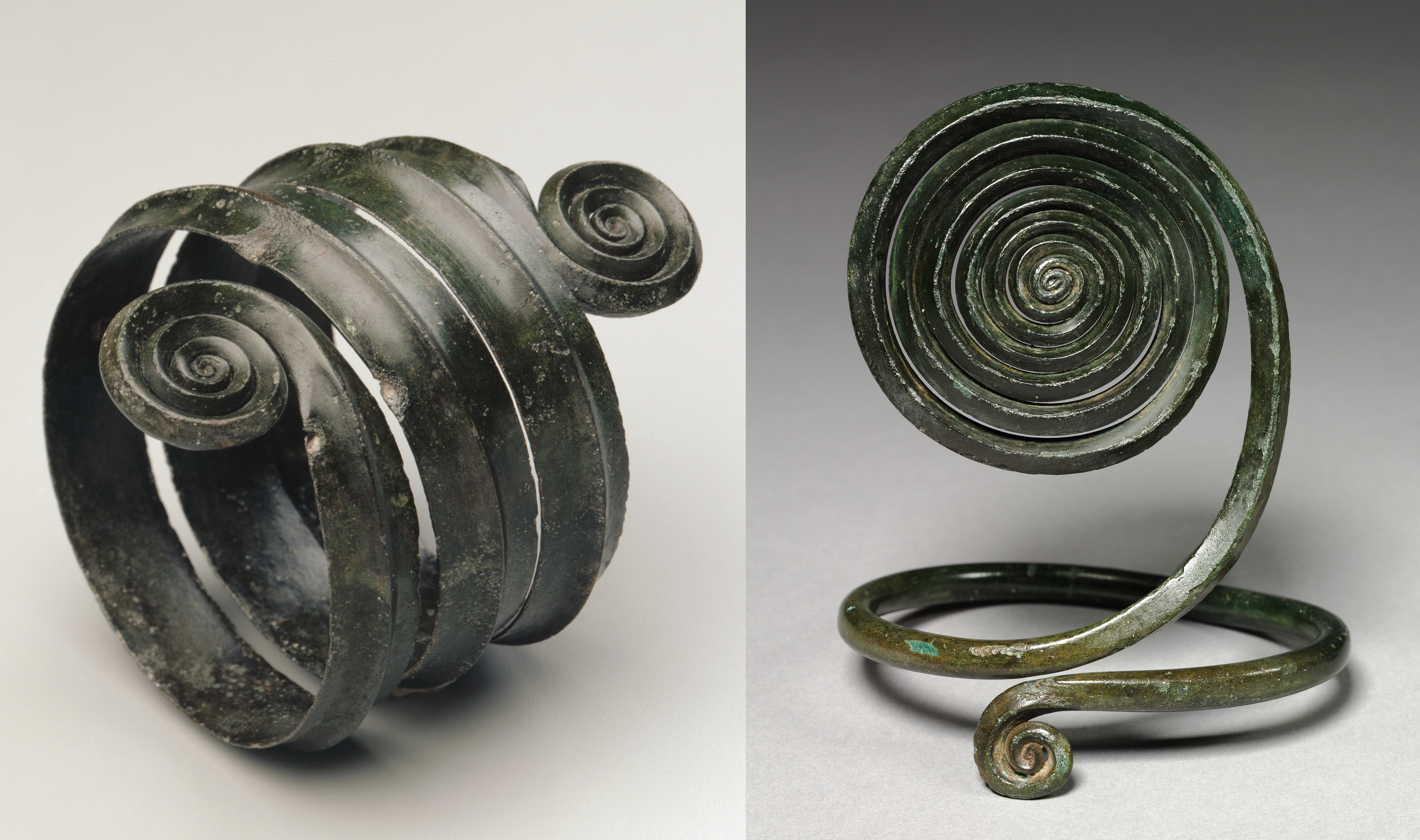
Bronze spiral arm ornaments, c. 1500 BC

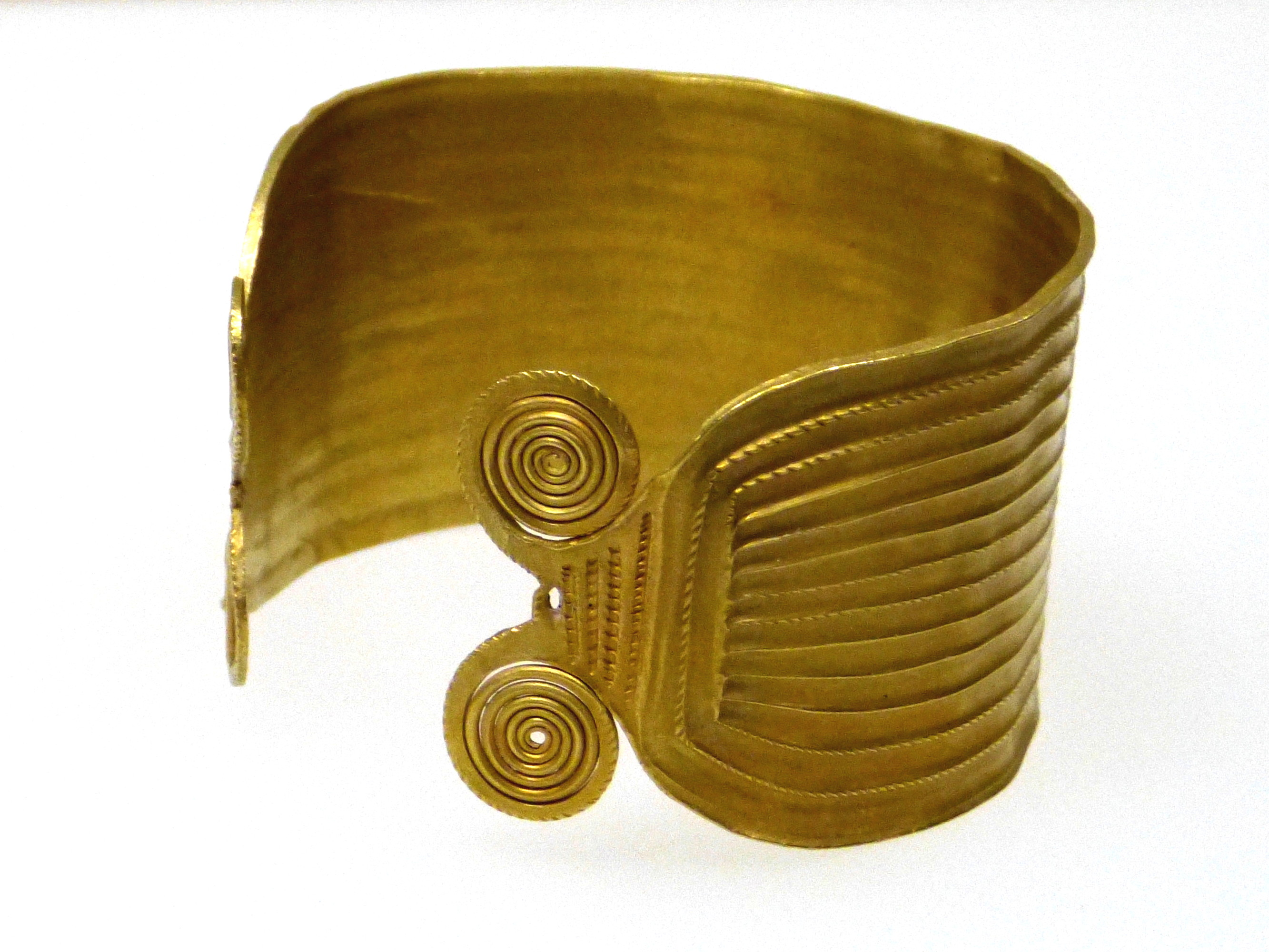
Gold bracelet from Nassenheide, Germany

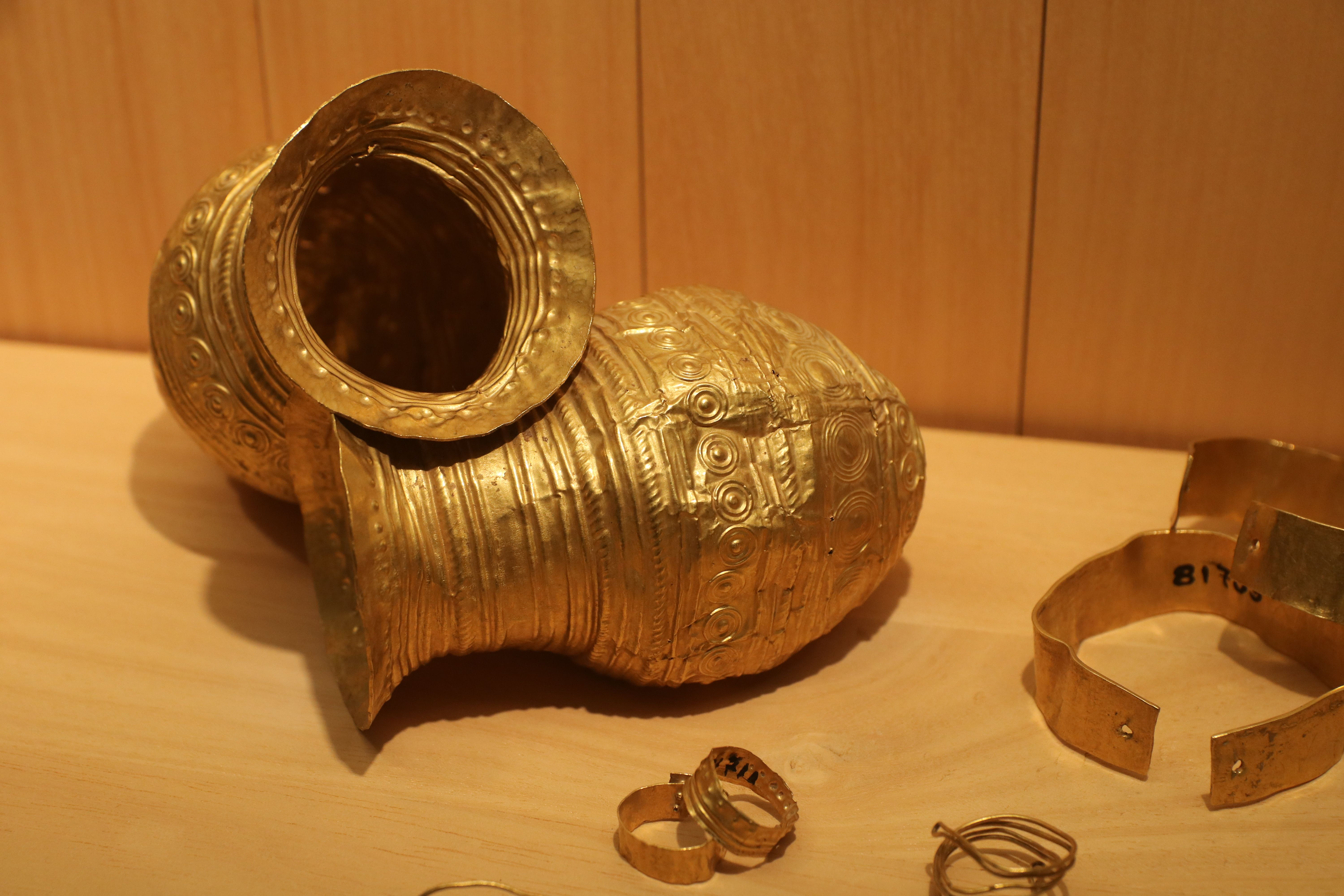
Gold artefacts, France, c. 1400 BC

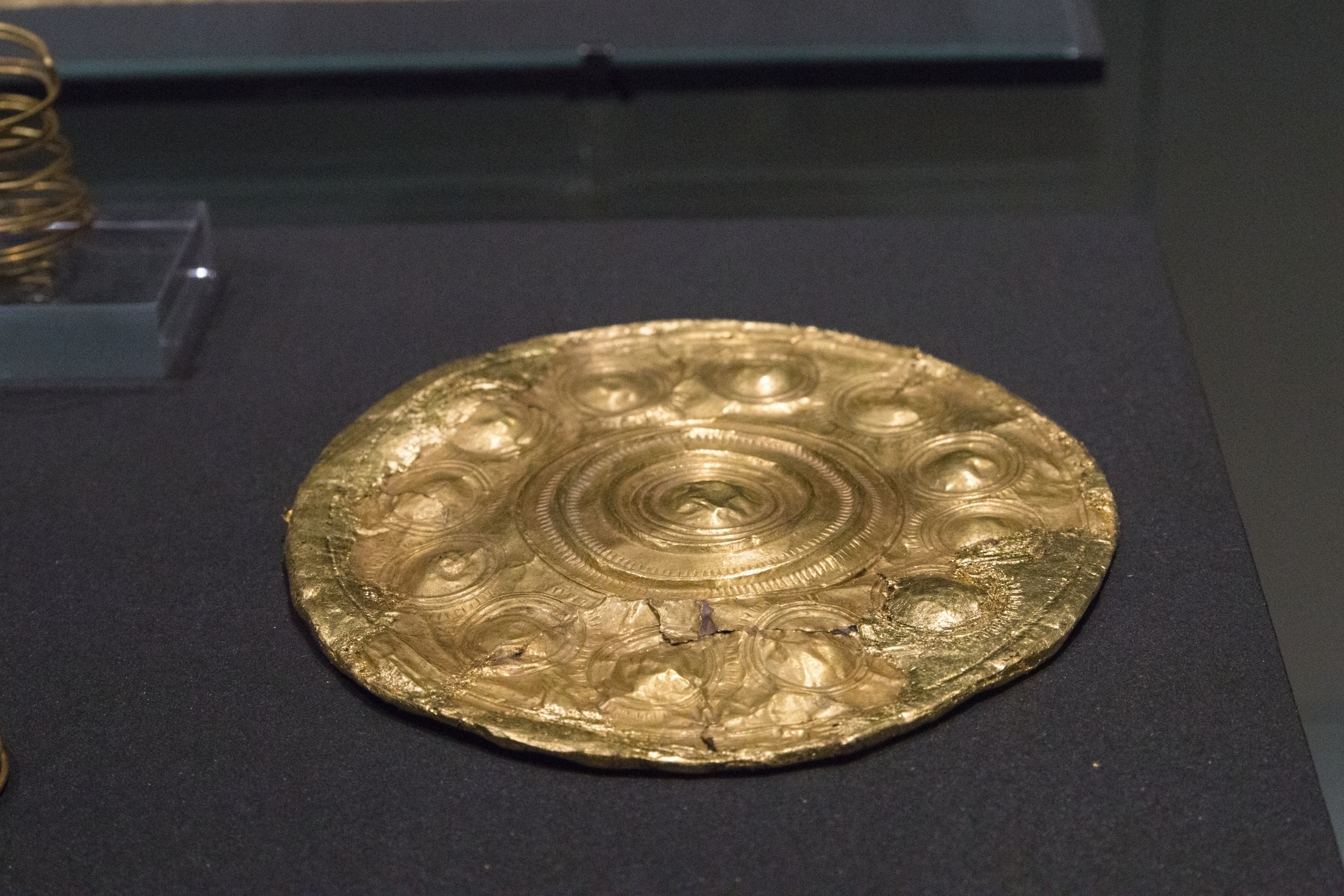
Gold disc, Czechia, c.1650 BC.

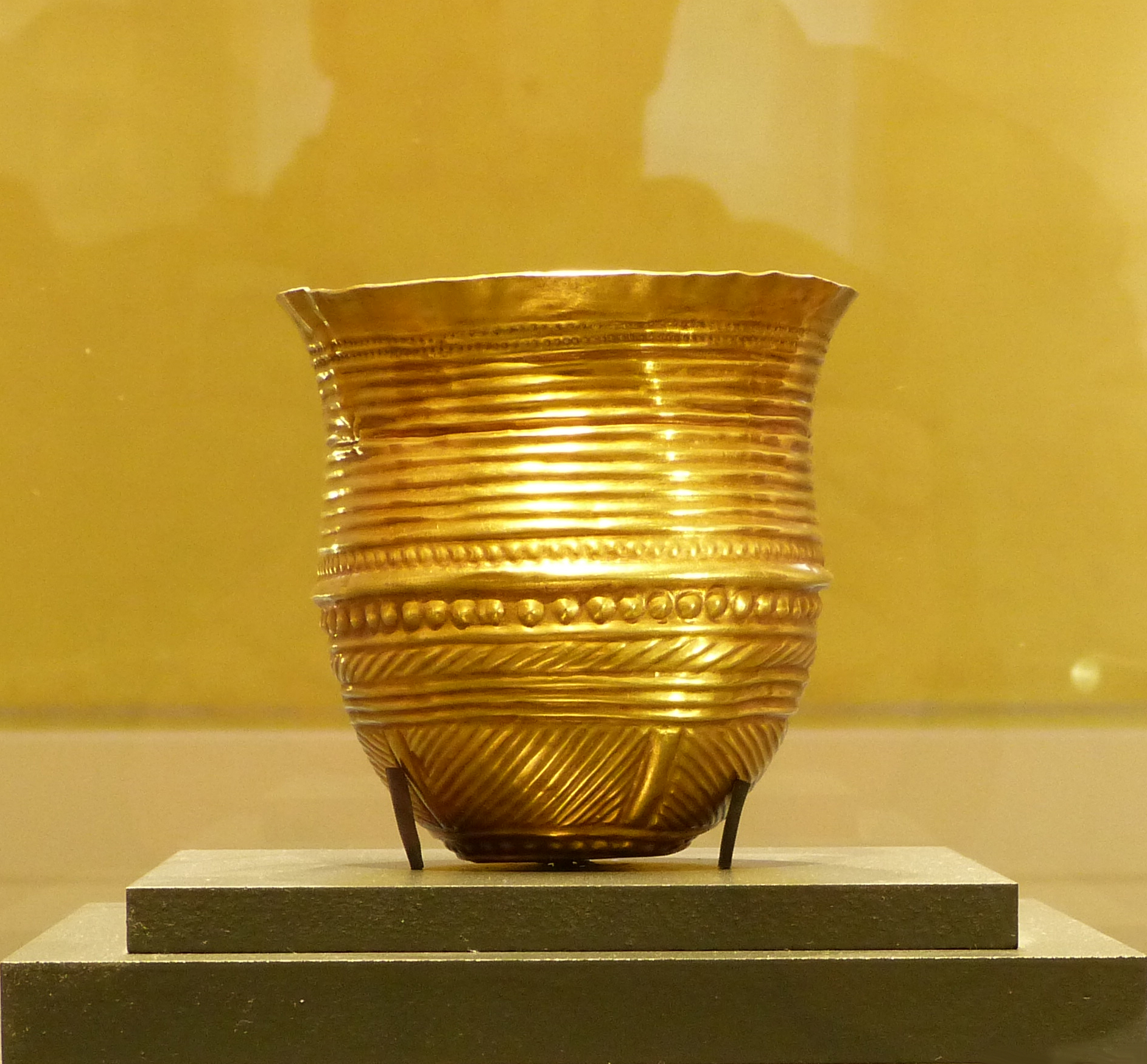
Gold cup from Eschenz, Switzerland, c. 1600 BC

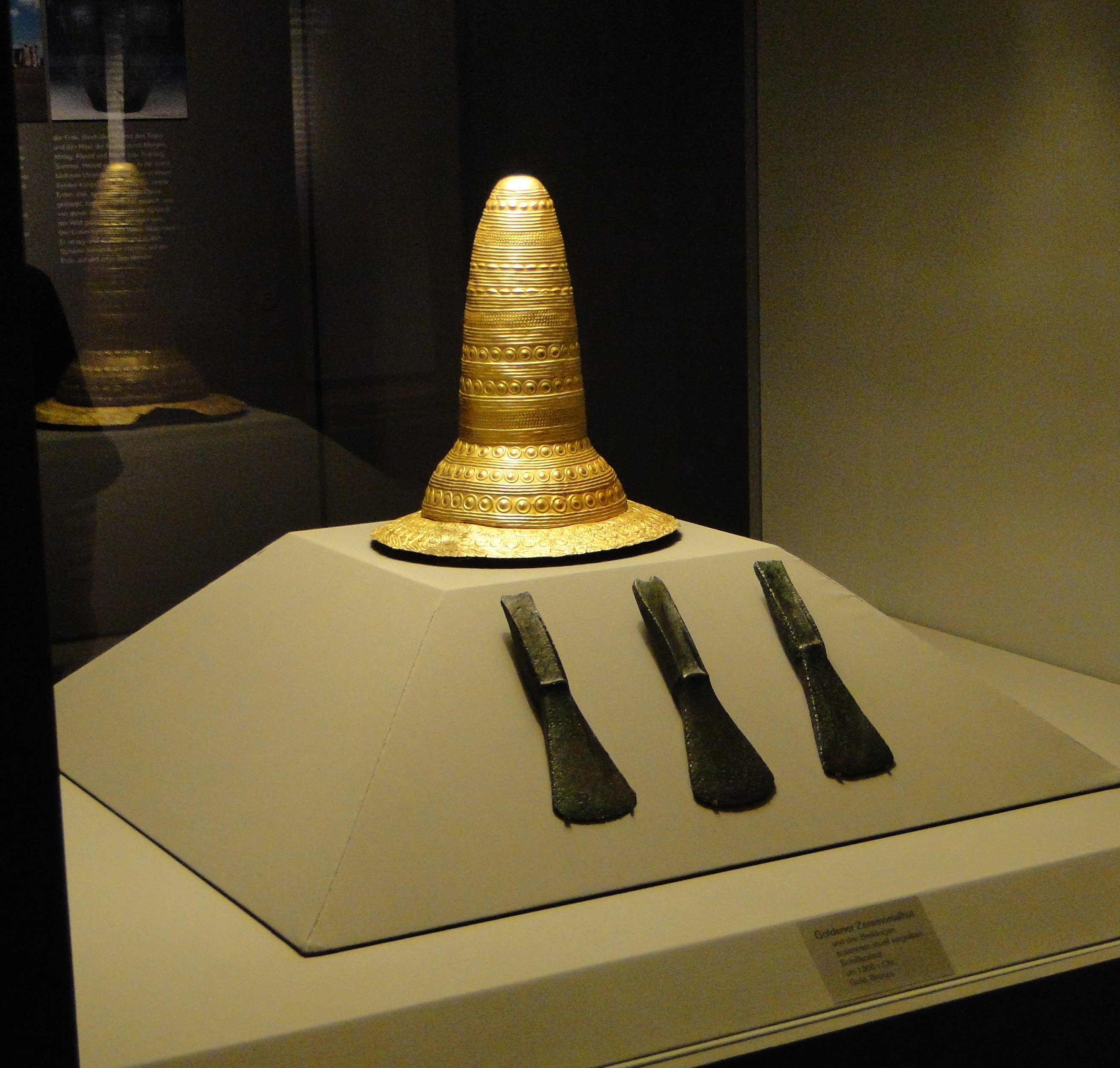
Schifferstadt gold hat, Germany, c. 1400 BC.

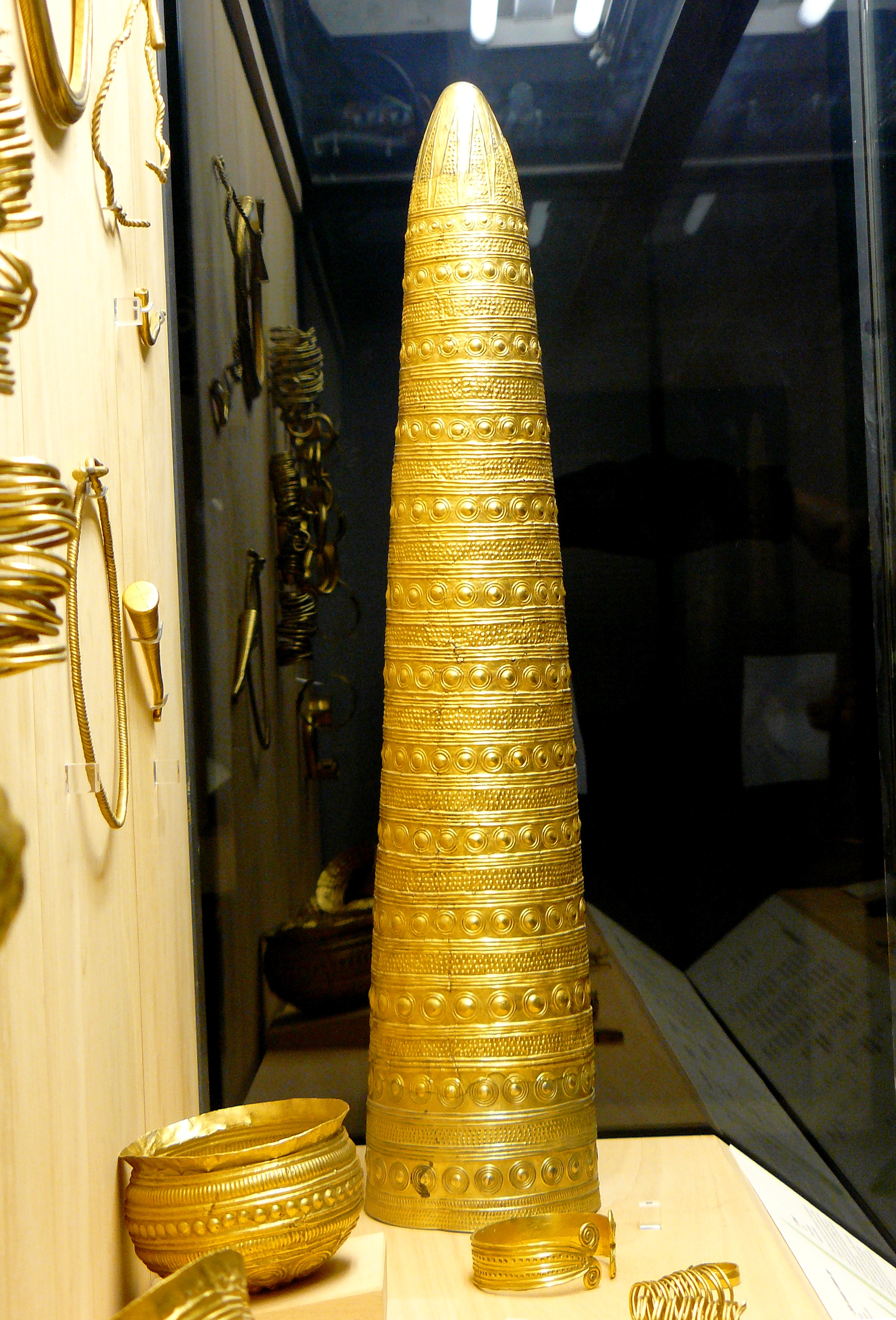
Avanton gold hat, France, c. 1400 BC

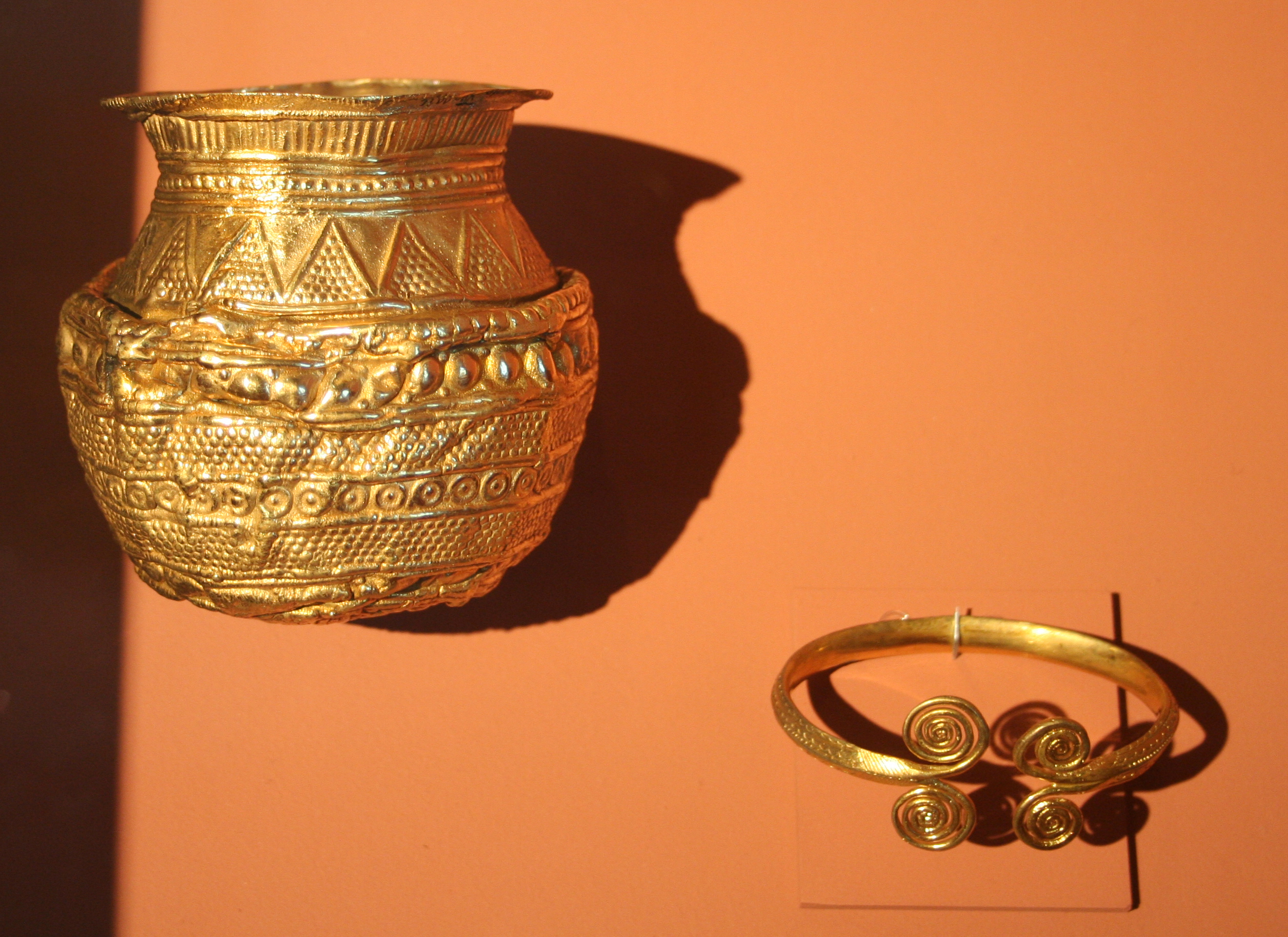
Gold artefacts, Germany, 14th c. BC

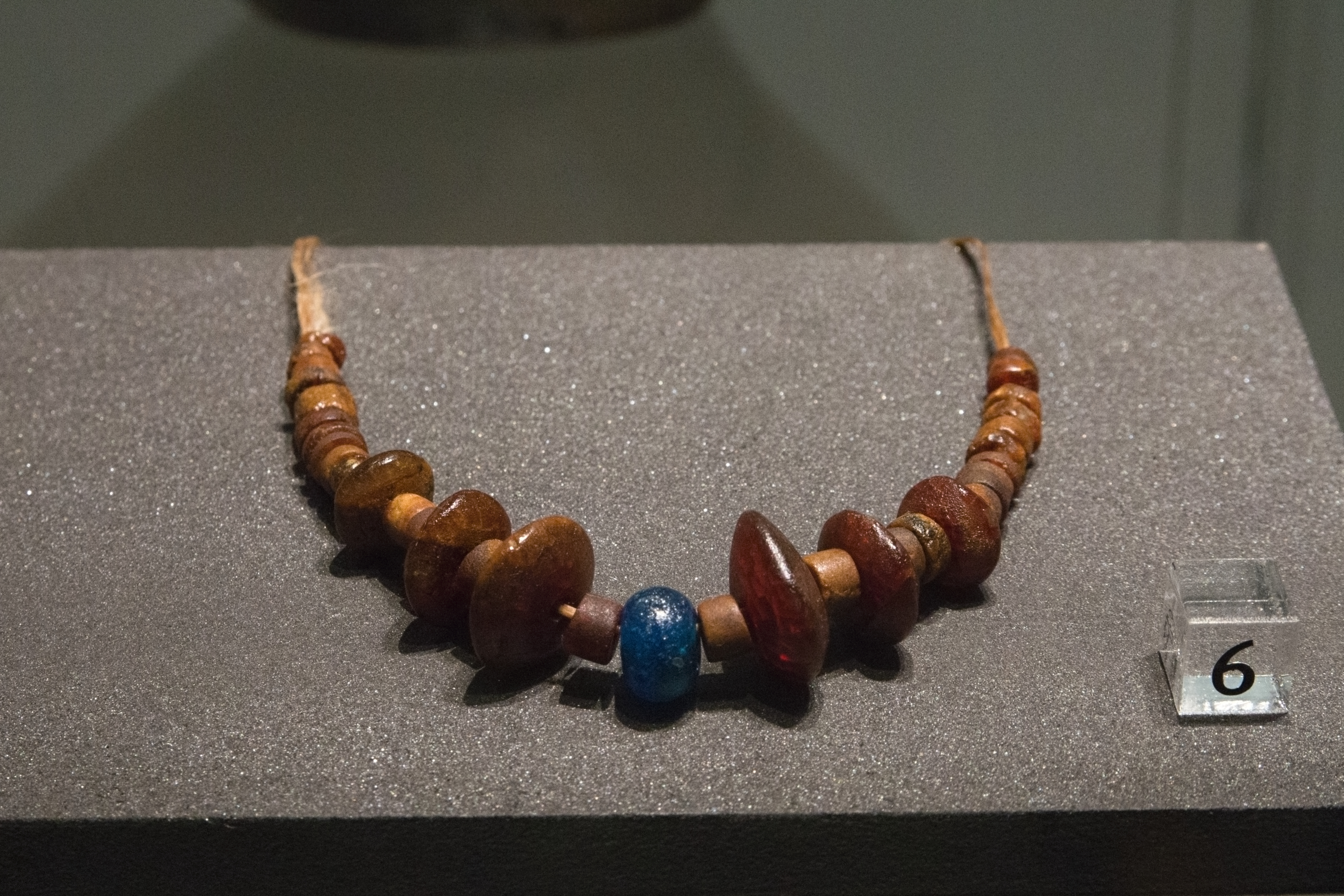
Amber, glass necklace, Czech Republic

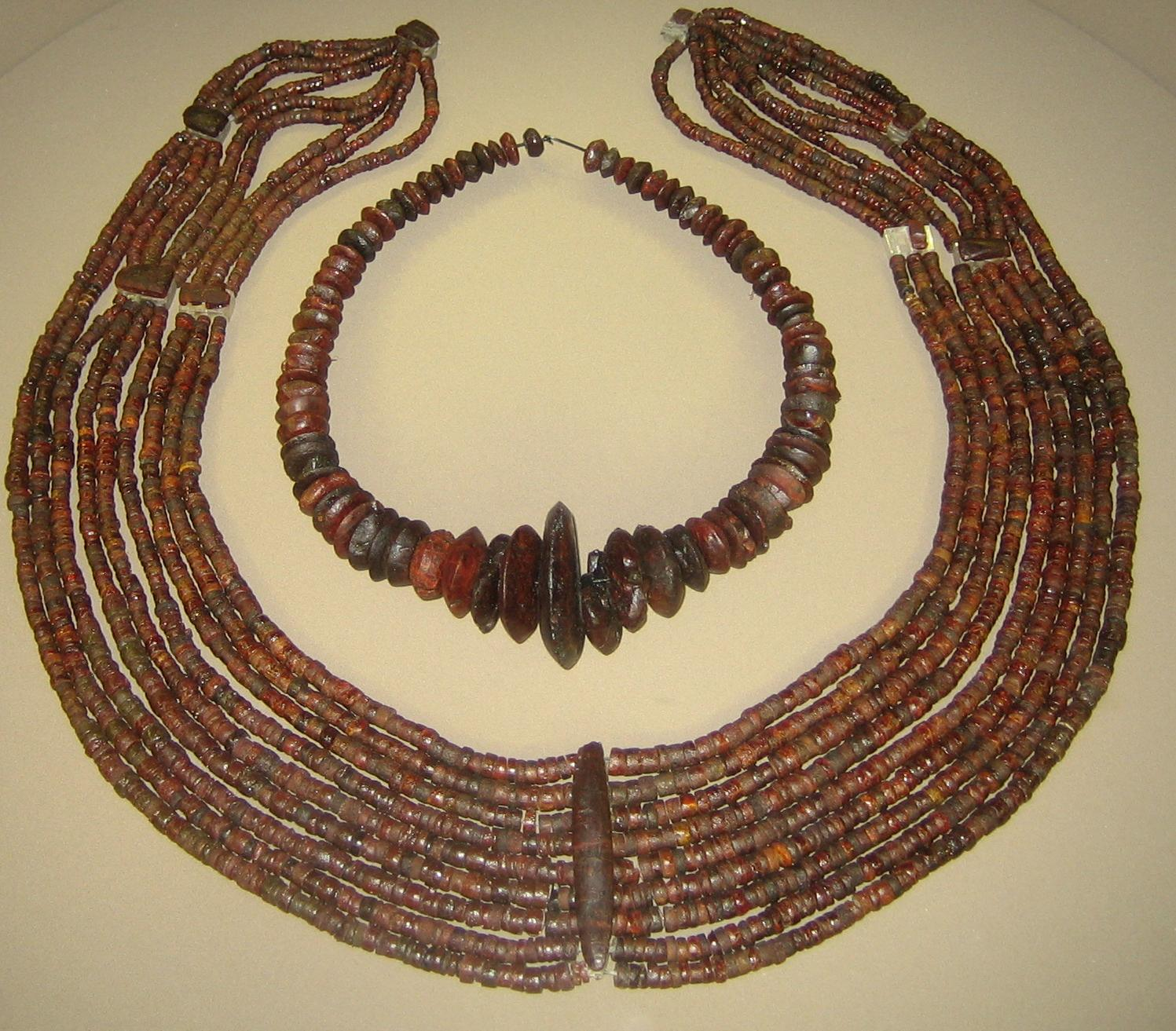
Amber necklace, Germany, 1500 BC.

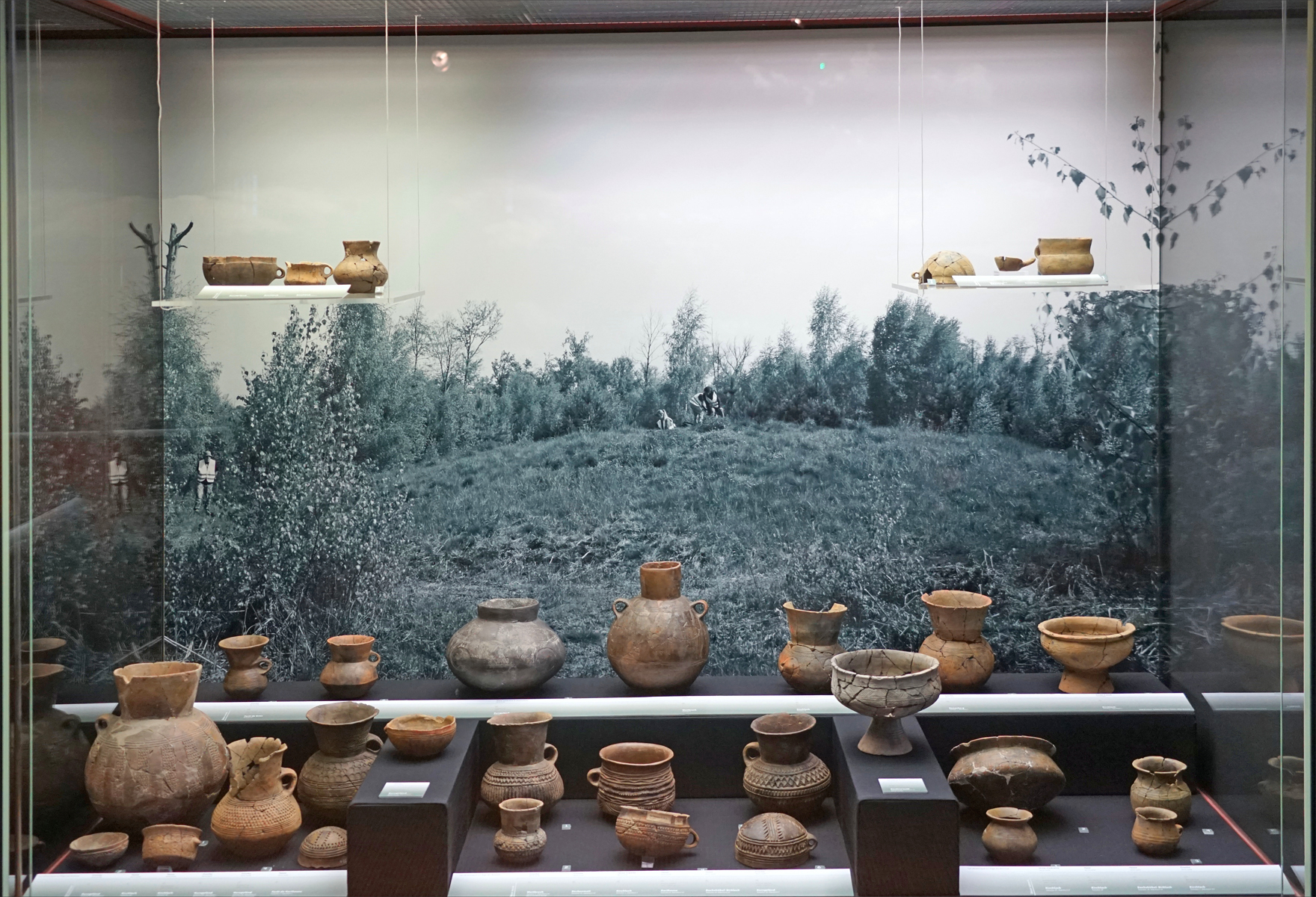
Tumulus ceramics, Hagenau, France

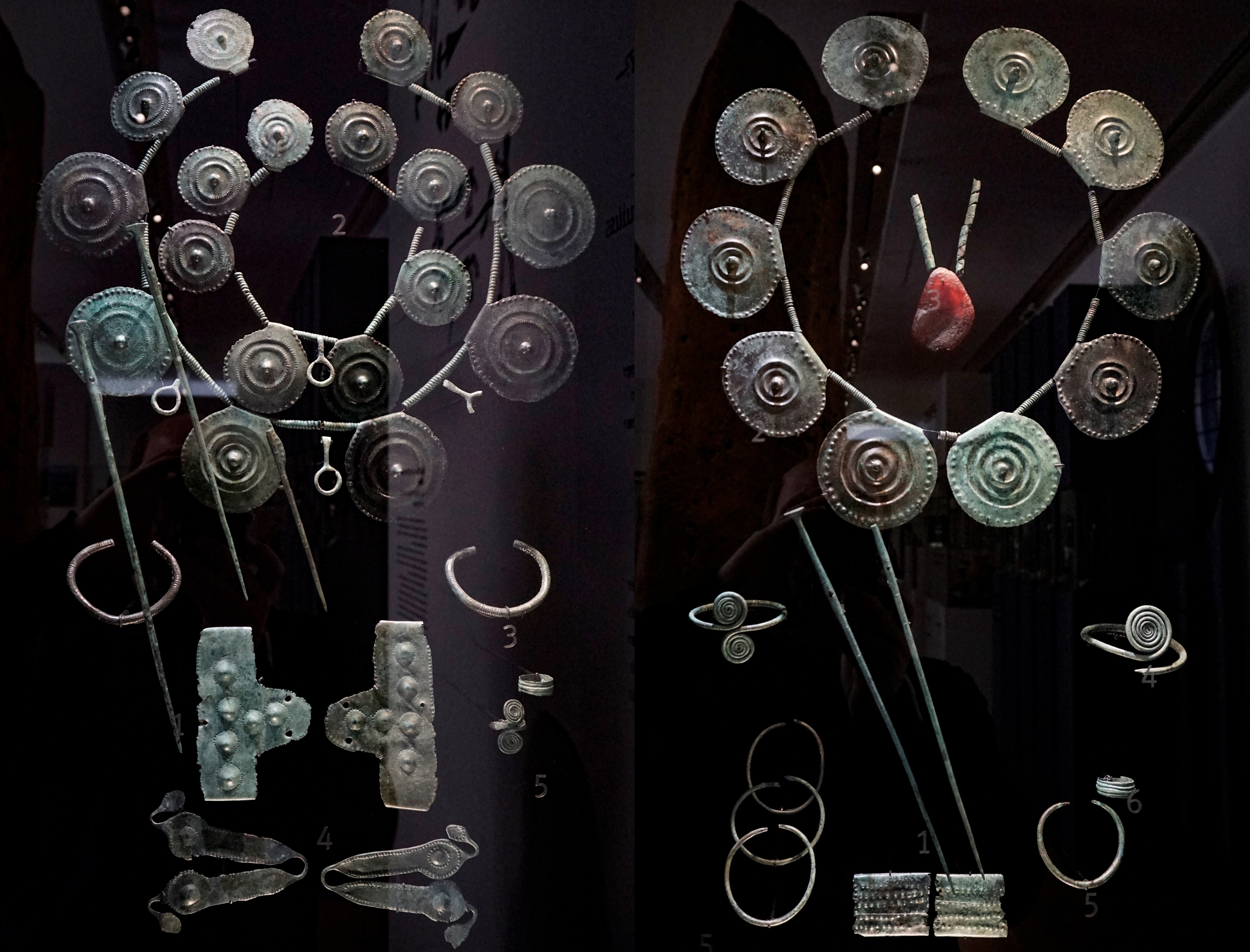
Bronze and amber ornaments, Germany, 1500-1400 BC

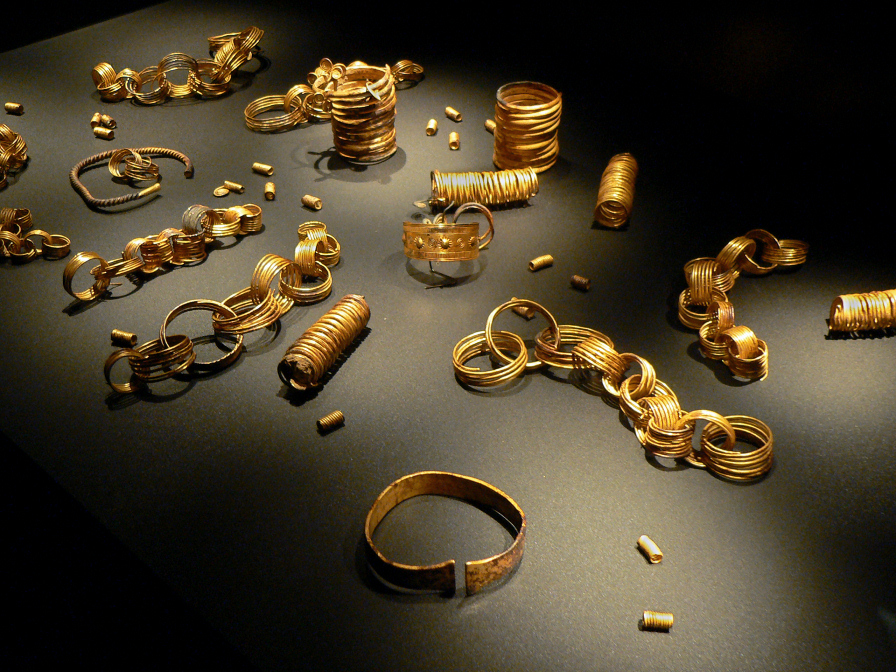
Gold hoard from Gessel, Germany, c. 1400 BC

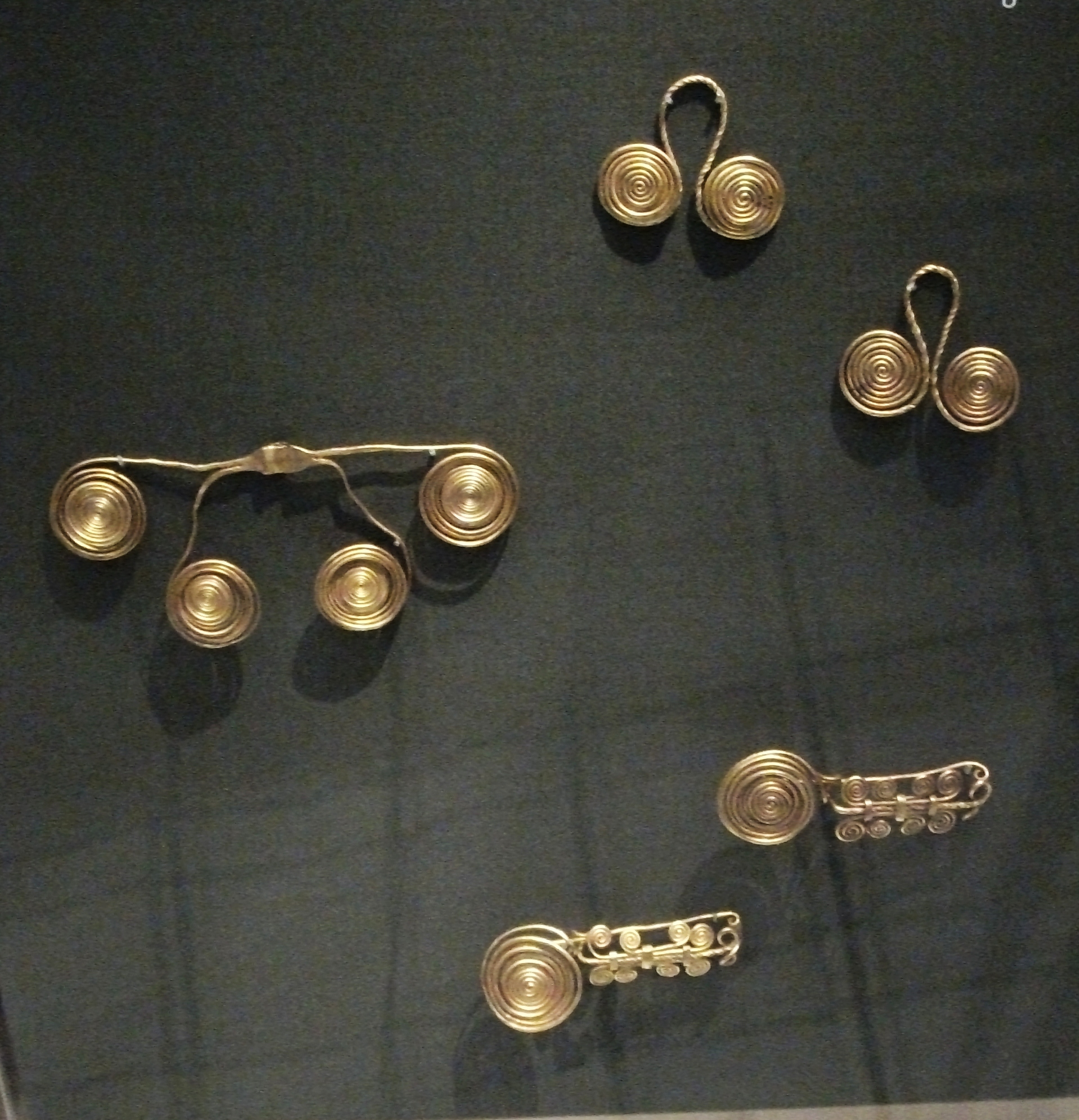
Gold Jewellery, Hungary

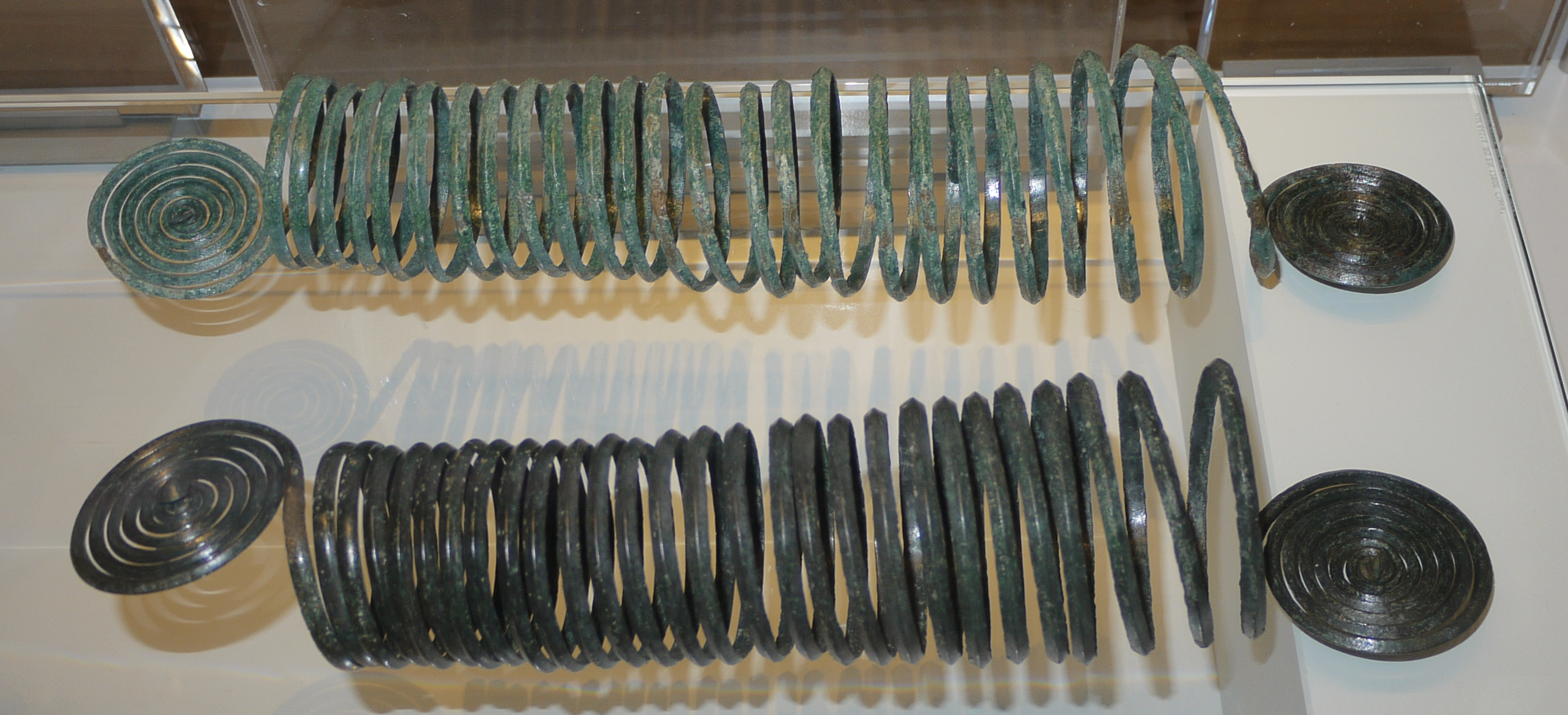
Bronze armbands, Hungary, 1400-1200 BC

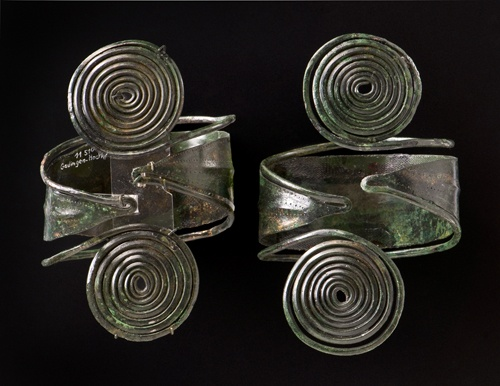
Bronze anklets, Germany, 1600-1400 BC

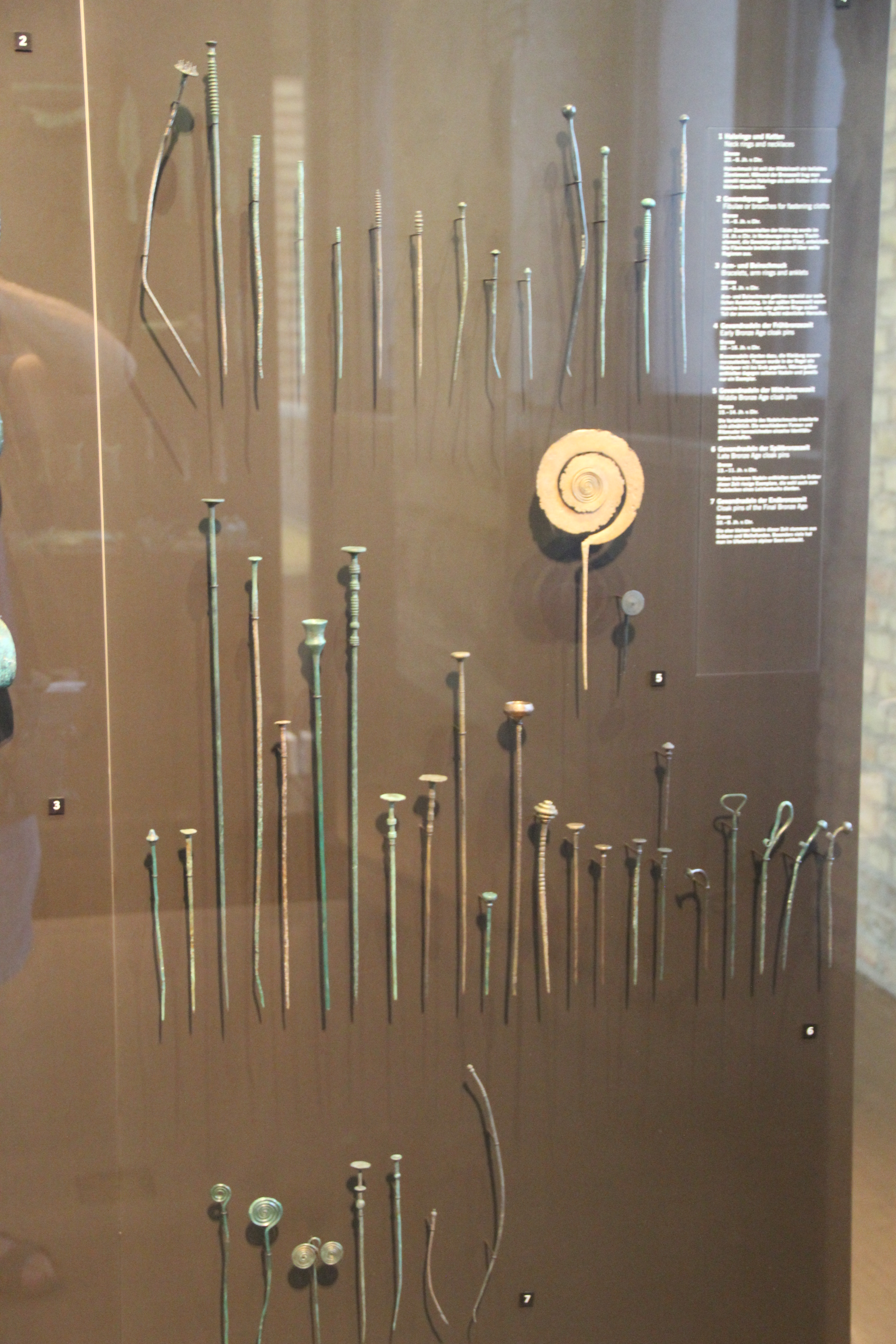
Bronze clothing pins

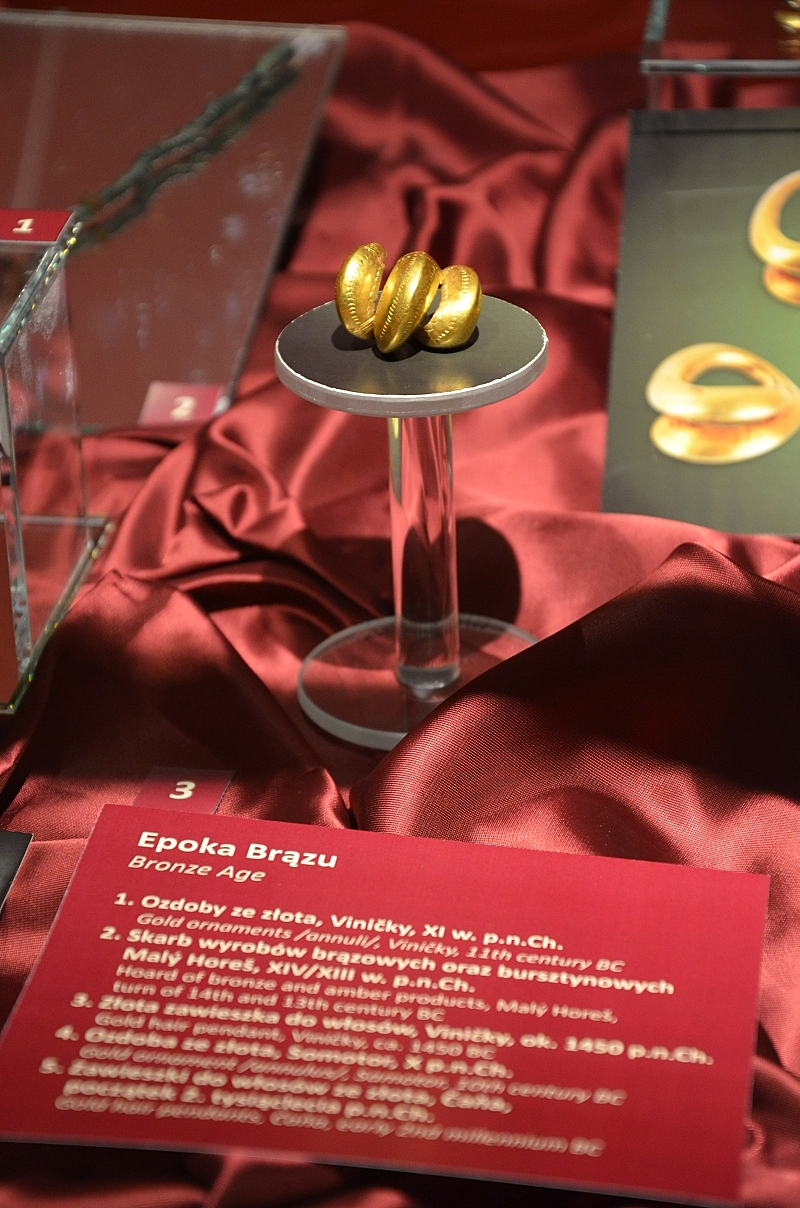
Gold ring, Carpathian basin

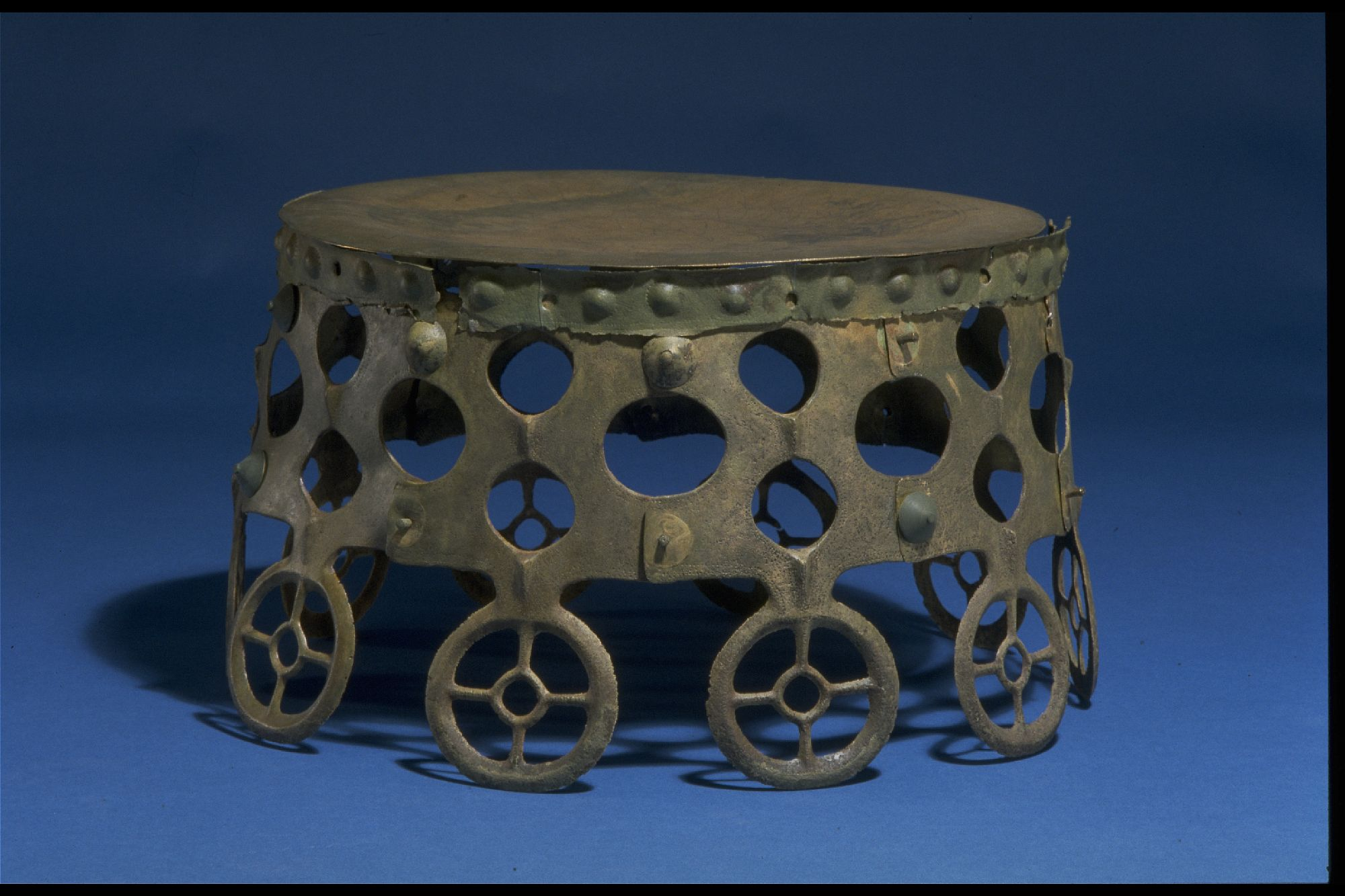
Ritual objects from Haschendorf in Austria and Balkåkra in Sweden

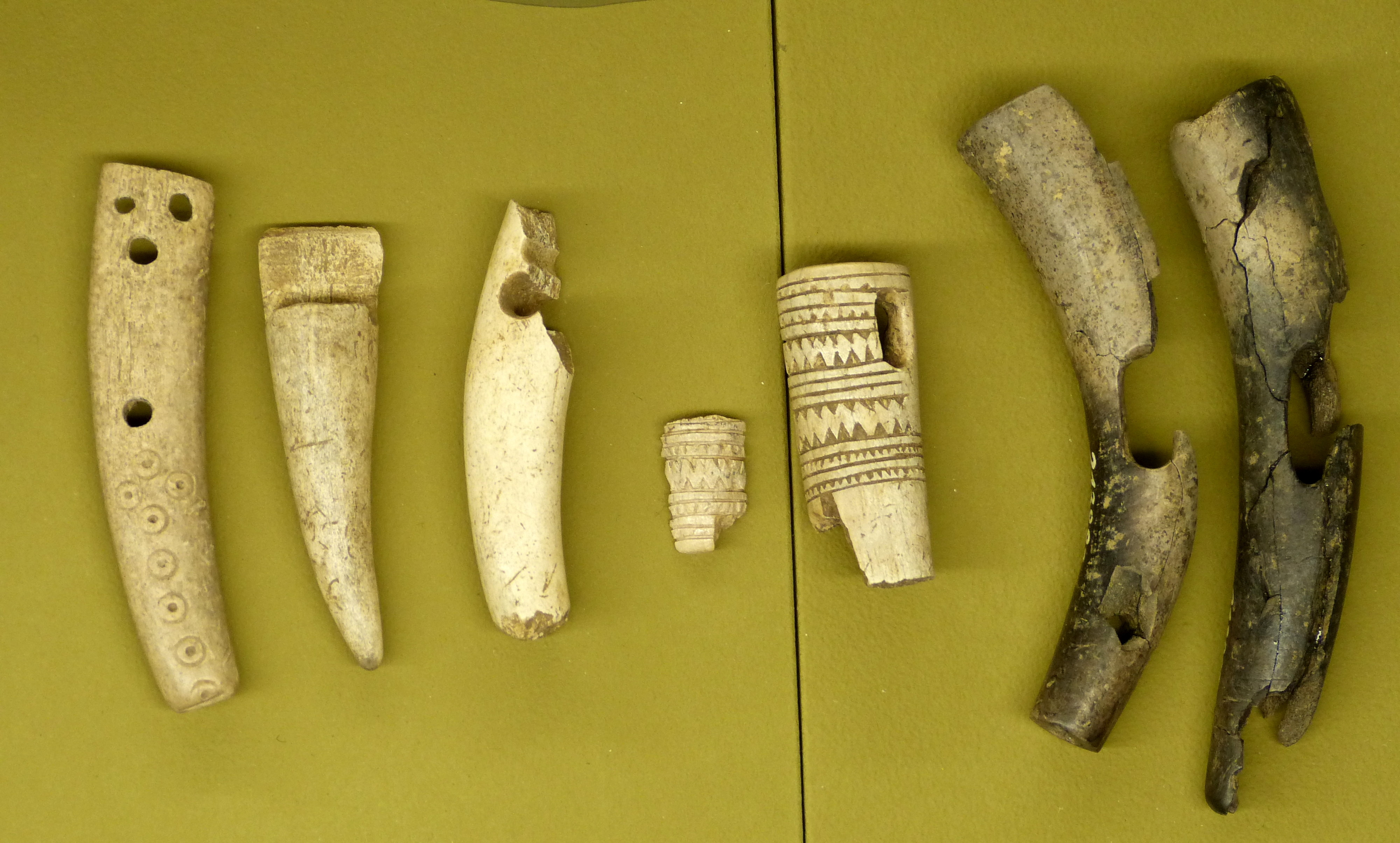
Horse bits made from antler, Germany

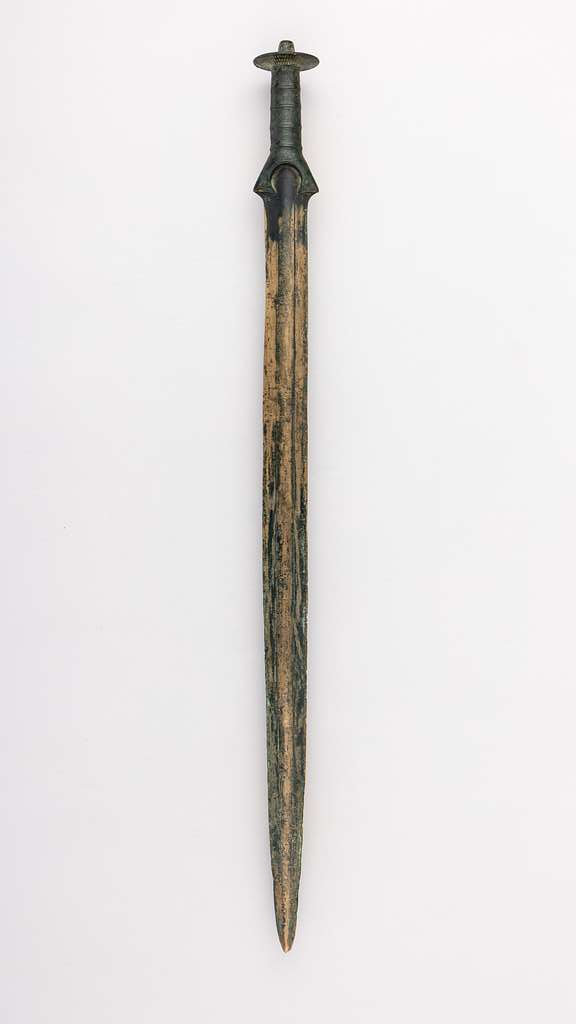
Bronze sword, Central Europe, 13th century BC

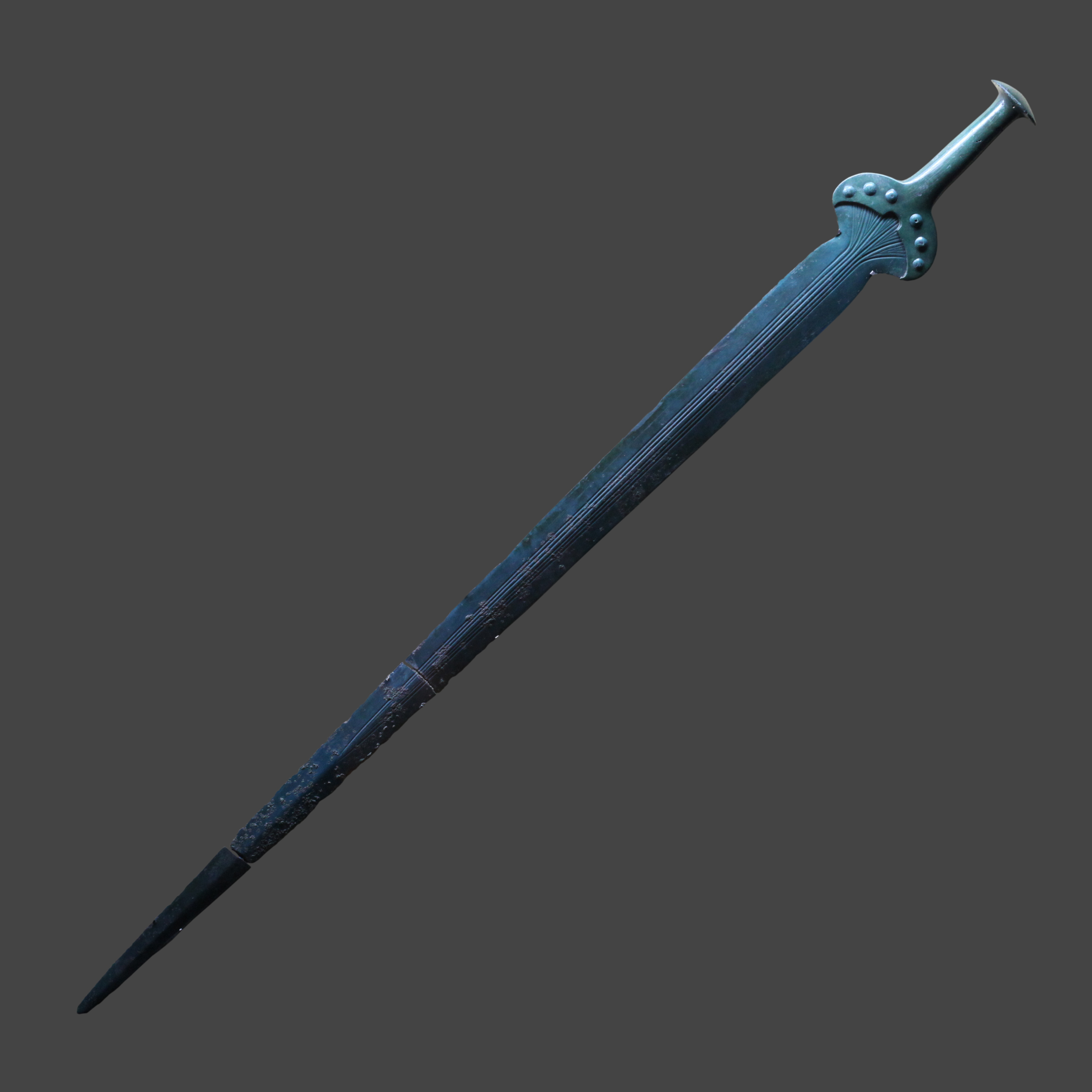
Bronze sword, France, 1550-1450 BC

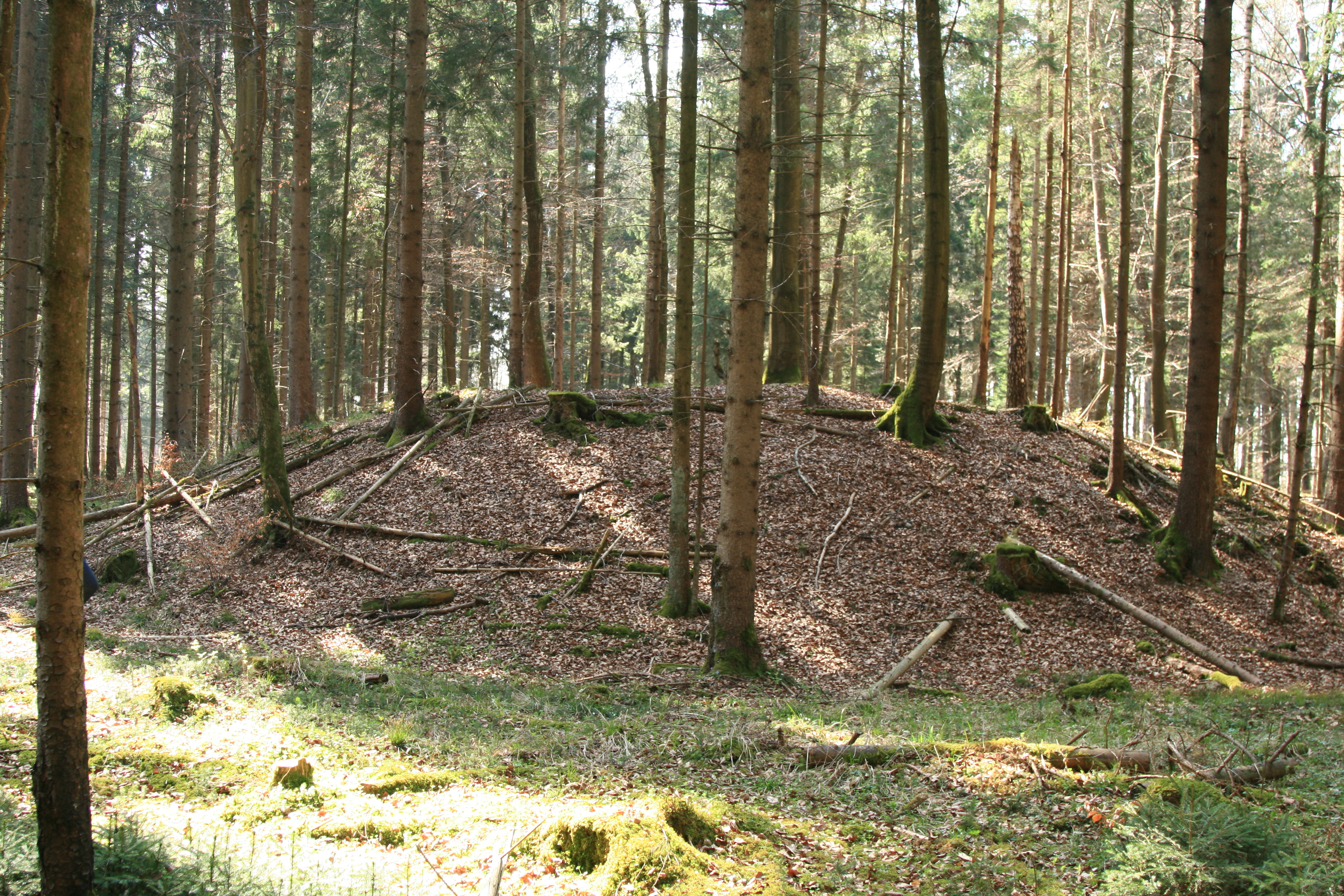
Tumulus, Germany

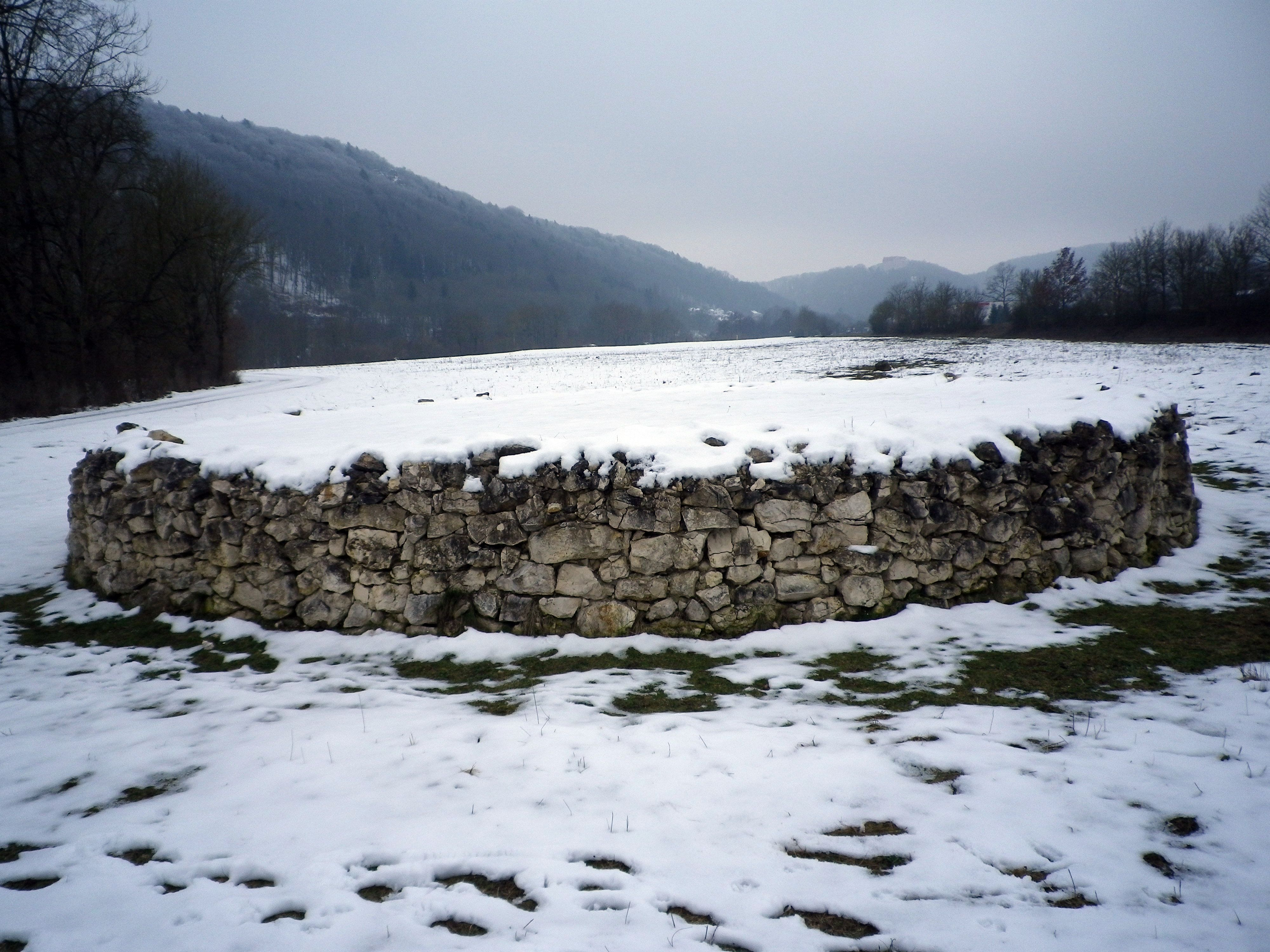
Cremation platform, Germany

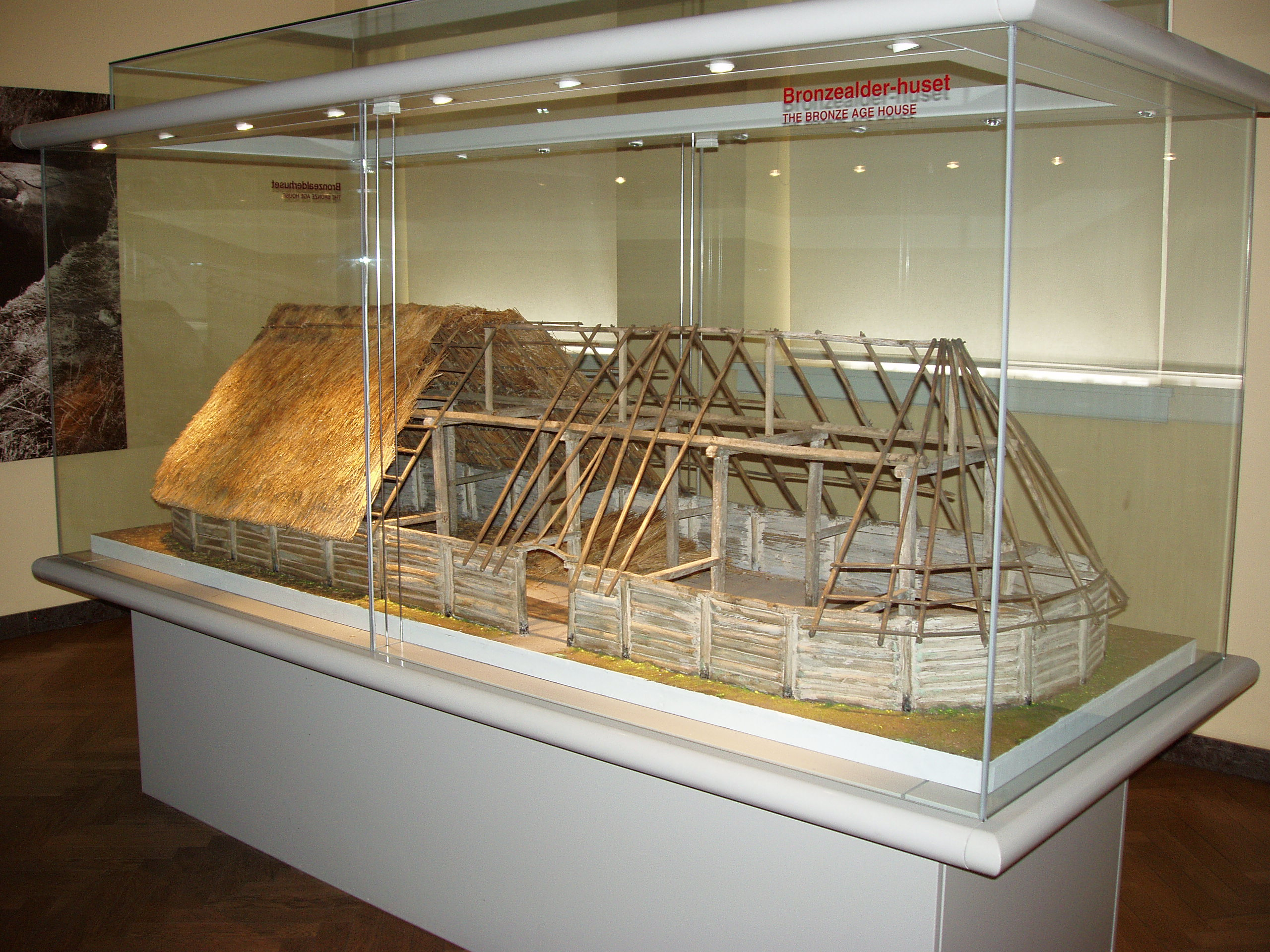
Middle Bronze Age house

== See also ==
- Apennine culture
- Argaric culture
- Atlantic Bronze Age
- Bell Beaker culture
- Bernstorf fortified settlement
- Bronze Age Britain
- Bronze hand of Prêles
- Frankleben hoard
- Mycenaean Greece
- Nordic Bronze Age
- Ottomany culture
- Srubnaya culture
- Terramare culture
- Urnfield culture
- Vatya culture
- Wietenberg culture
