= 1550s BC =

The 1550s BC was a decade lasting from January 1, 1559 BC to December 31, 1550 BC.

== Events and trends ==
- The city of Mycenae, located in the northeast Peloponnesus, comes to dominate the rest of Achaea, giving its name to the Mycenaean civilization.
- 1557 BC—Estimation: Memphis, capital of Lower Egypt becomes the largest city of the world, taking the lead from Avaris, capital of the Hyksos in Egypt.
- 1556 BC—Cecrops I builds or rebuilds Athens following the great flood of Deucalion and the end of the Silver age. He becomes the first of several Kings of Athens whose life account is considered part of Greek mythology.
- c. 1552 BC—End of Second Intermediate period in Ancient Egypt. Start of New Kingdom. 18th–20th Dynasties.
- c. 1550 BC—Second Intermediate Period ends in Ancient Egypt (other date is 1552 BC).
- c. 1550 BC—New Kingdom starts in Ancient Egypt (other date is 1552 BC).
- c. 1550 BC—Eighteenth dynasty of Egypt starts (other date is 1552 BC).
- 1550 BC—Ahmose I becomes Pharaoh of Egypt (although only de facto ruler of Upper Egypt) according to the Low Chronology.
- 1550 BC—May 14—Lunar Saros 35 begins.
- c. 1550 BC–1500 BC—Dagger blades with lion hunt, from Shaft Grave IV, Grave Circle A, at Mycenae, Greece, are made. They are now at National Archaeological Museum of Athens.
