= Kochan (disambiguation) =

Kochan is a village in Bulgaria.

Kochan may also refer to:

- Kochań, a village in Poland
- Kochan (surname)
