= Jean-Christophe Attias =

French historian and scholar (born 1958)

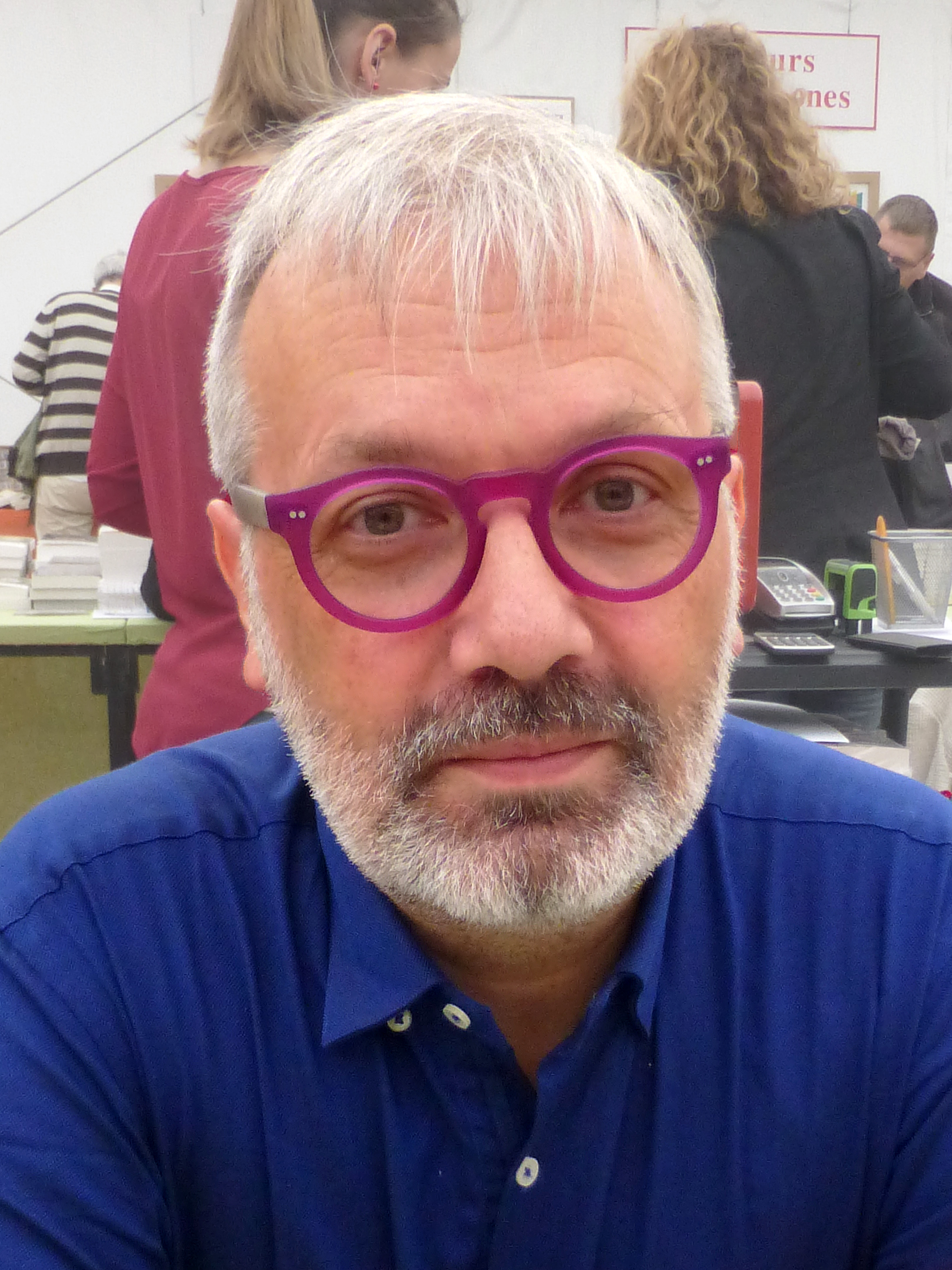
- Jean-Christophe Attias in 2015
- Born: 1958 (age 67–68)
- Occupations: Historian, Scholar, Professor
- Spouse: Esther Benbassa
- Awards: Seligmann Prize against Racism (2006), Goncourt Prize for Biography (2015)

Academic background
- Education: University of Paris I, National Institute of Oriental Languages and Civilizations, University of Paris VIII

Academic work
- Discipline: Jewish history, medieval Jewish thought
- Institutions: École pratique des hautes études (PSL University)
- Notable works: Moïse fragile, Israel, the Impossible Land, The Jews and the Bible
- Website: Personal website

Jean-Christophe Attias (born 1958) is a French Jewish historian and scholar.

He is a professor of medieval Jewish thought at the École pratique des hautes études (PSL University, Paris).

Education and Academic Career

Jean-Christophe Attias studied philosophy (at the University of Paris-I) and Hebrew (at the National Institute of Oriental Languages and Civilizations). He was a doctoral fellow of the Lady Davis Fellowship Trust at the Department of Jewish History at the Hebrew University of Jerusalem during 1988-1989. He holds the CAPES (1980) and the agrégation (1987) in Modern Hebrew.

He defended a doctoral thesis in Hebrew studies titled "Knowledge and Power in Constantinople: Mordekhai Komtino, Exegete-Teacher (15th Century)" at the University of Paris-VIII (1990). He obtained a habilitation to supervise research by presenting a thesis titled "Judaism and Liminality: Contributions to the Intellectual and Literary History of Medieval Judaism" before a jury composed of Maurice Kriegel (EHESS, guarantor), Michel Tardieu (Collège de France, president), Michael Löwy (CNRS), Aron Rodrigue (Stanford University), and Colette Sirat (EPHE) (1997, EHESS).

He taught Modern Hebrew for about ten years in secondary education before becoming a researcher at CNRS, member of the Center for the Study of the Religions of the Book (CNRS-EPHE) from 1991 to 1998. In 1998, he was elected professor at the Section of Religious Sciences of the École Pratique des Hautes Études, holding the chair of "Medieval Jewish Thought (6th–17th centuries)," succeeding Charles Touati.

A specialist in the history of medieval Jewish exegesis of Scripture, Jean-Christophe Attias has published his initial works on authors from the late Middle Ages (15th–16th centuries) belonging to the Mediterranean area (Byzantium and the Iberian Peninsula). Since then, he has broadened the chronological, geographical, and thematic scope of his research. As a historian of culture and representations, he has, among other interests, focused on the figure of the proselyte in rabbinic Judaism, the "margins" of Judaism (late Karaism), the place of the "Land of Israel" in Jewish memory, and the role of the Bible in Jewish culture and imagination. He published a portrait titled "Moïse fragile" (Alma, 2015, winner of the Goncourt Prize for Biography 2015, reissued in paperback by CNRS Éditions, 2016).

Institutional Responsibilities

Jean-Christophe Attias is first the deputy director, and then the director (since 2018) of the Alberto Benveniste Center for Sephardic Studies and the Sociocultural History of Jews at the École Pratique des Hautes Études (EPHE), a component of the Research Unit 8596 (CNRS-Sorbonne University-EPHE). From 2011 to 2015, he served as president of the Philosophy, Psychoanalysis, and Religious Sciences Commission of the National Book Center.

Associative Engagement

Involved in the fight against racism and discrimination, he is a co-founder of Pari(s) du vivre-ensemble. In 2006, with Esther Benbassa, he was awarded the Seligmann Prize against Racism for the collective work "Jews and Muslims: A Shared History, A Dialogue to Build."

Personal Life

He was born to a Jewish father from Algeria (who arrived in mainland France in 1946) and a Catholic mother from Charente. He is married to Esther Benbassa, Emerita Professor at the École Pratique des Hautes Études and formerly senator for Europe Écologie Les Verts (until December 2021, when she left this party), with whom he has co-authored several works.

== Research interests ==
- History of the Jewish exegesis of the Bible in the Middle Ages, especially in the XVth-XVIth Century Mediterranean (Spain and Byzantium), exegesis as a literary genre.
- History of culture and representations : the image of the proselyte in Jewish culture, Judaism and its « margins » (such as Karaism), the place of the « Land f Israel » in Jewish memory, etc.
- Place and function of the Bible in Jewish culture and imagination.
- Moses in Jewish and general culture.
- Judaism and Nature.

== Works ==
=== In English ===
- Israel, the Impossible Land, Stanford, Stanford University Press, 2003 (with Esther Benbassa)
- The Jews and their Future. A Conversation on Jewish Identities, London, Zed Books, 2004 (with E. Benbassa)
- The Jew and the Other, Ithaca, Cornell University Press, 2004 (with E. Benbassa)
- The Jews and the Bible, Stanford, Stanford University Press, 2014;
- A Woman Called Moses. A Prophet for Our Time, Verso, 2020.

=== In French ===
- Abraham Aboulafia. L'épître des sept voies, Paris, Éditions de l'Éclat, 1985 (translation and notes); new ed., Paris, Éditions de l'Éclat, 2008
- Le Commentaire biblique. Mordekhai Komtino ou l'herméneutique du dialogue, Paris, Cerf, 1991
- Isaac Abravanel, la mémoire et l'espérance, Paris, Cerf, 1992
- Penser le judaïsme, Paris, CNRS Éditions, 2010; new revised and enlarged ed, Paris, CNRS Éditions, 2013
- Les Juifs et la Bible, Paris, Fayard, 2012; new ed., Paris, Cerf, 2014
- Moïse fragile, Paris, Alma, 2015; new ed., Paris, CNRS Éditions, 2016
- Un juif de mauvaise foi, Paris, Lattès, 2017
- Nos Conversations célestes, Paris, Alma, 2020 (novel)

==== With Esther Benbassa ====
- Dictionnaire de civilisation juive, Paris, Larousse-Bordas, 1997; 2nd ed.,1998
- Israël imaginaire, Paris, Flammarion, 1998; 2nd ed., 2001 (sous le titre Israël, la terre et le sacré)
- Les Juifs ont-ils un avenir ?, Paris, Lattès, 2001; 2nd ed., Paris, Hachette, coll. « Pluriel », 2002
- Le Juif et l’Autre, Gordes, Le Relié, 2002
- Petite histoire du judaïsme, Paris, Librio, 2007
- Dictionnaire des mondes juifs, Paris, Larousse, 2008
- Israël-Gaza. La Conscience juive a l'épreuve des massacres, Paris, Textuel, 2024

==== Editor ====
- De la Conversion, Paris, Cerf, 1998
- Enseigner le judaïsme à l'Université, Genève, Labor et Fides, 1998 (withPierre Gisel)
- La haine de soi. Difficiles identités, Bruxelles, Complexe, 2000 (withEsther Benbassa)
- Messianismes. Variations autour d’une figure juive, Genève, Labor et Fides, 2000 (with Pierre Gisel and Lucie Kaennel)
- De la Bible à la littérature, Genève, Labor et Fides, 2003 (with Pierre Gisel)
- Juifs et musulmans. Une histoire partagée, un dialogue à construire, Paris, La Découverte, 2006 (with Esther Benbassa)
- Les Sépharades et l’Europe. De Maïmonide à Spinoza, Paris, Presses de l’université Paris-Sorbonne, 2012
- Encyclopédie des religions, Paris, Fayard/Pluriel, 2012 (with Esther Benbassa)
- Dans les quartiers, l’égalité c’est maintenant ! Livre blanc, Paris, Le Pari(s) du Vivre-Ensemble, 2014 (with Esther Benbassa)
- Juifs et musulmans. Retissons les liens!, Paris, CNRS Éditions, 2015 (with Esther Benbassa)
- Nouvelles relégations territoriales, Paris, CNRS Éditions, 2017 (with Esther Benbassa)

== Awards ==
- Seligmann Award against Racism, Injustice and Intolérance (2006).
- Prix Goncourt de la Biographie for Moïse fragile (2015).
