= Lipienica =

Lipienica may refer to the following places in Poland:

- Lipienica, Lower Silesian Voivodeship (south-west Poland)
- Lipienica, Golub-Dobrzyń County in Kuyavian-Pomeranian Voivodeship (north-central Poland)
- Lipienica, Świecie County in Kuyavian-Pomeranian Voivodeship (north-central Poland)
- Lipienica, Lubusz Voivodeship (west Poland)
