= Daniel Bodi =

French historian

- Born: 1956 (age 69–70)

Academic background
- Education: Fuller Theological Seminary; University of Strasbourg; Union Theological Seminary; Paris-Sorbonne University
- Thesis: The Yahweh War Accounts; Terminological and Thematic Comparisons Between the Book of Ezekiel and Akkadian Literature With Special Reference to the Poem of Erra; Poetics of the Book of Ezekiel

Academic work
- Discipline: history
- Sub-discipline: history of religion Biblical Hebrew
- Institutions: Paris-Sorbonne University; Institut Catholique de Paris; Paris 8 University Vincennes-Saint-Denis; Institut National des Langues et Civilisations Orientales; University of Strasbourg

Daniel Bodi (born 1956) is a French historian and professor of history of religions at the Paris-Sorbonne University.

== Education ==
In 1980 Bodi earned a Master of Arts of Old Testament and Semitic languages at the Fuller Theological Seminary. From 1983 Bodi holds a ThD in Protestant theology of the Old Testament from the University of Strasbourg with the thesis The Yahweh War Accounts, with his mentor Jean-Georges Heintz. In 1986 he earned a M.Phil. in Hebrew Bible and Semitic languages at the Union Theological Seminary in New York. From 1988 Bodi holds a Ph.D. from the Union Theological Seminary in New York City, with the dissertation Terminological and Thematic Comparisons Between the Book of Ezekiel and Akkadian Literature With Special Reference to the Poem of Erra. From 1996 he holds the Habilitation to direct doctoral research at the Paris-Sorbonne University with the dissertation Poetics of the Book of Ezekiel: Philology, Analogical Hermeneutic and History of Traditions (La poétique du livre d'Ézéchiel: philologie, herméneutique analogique et histoire des traditions.

== Teaching ==
From 1993 to 2017 Bodi was an adjunct professor of Akkadian at the History Department of the University of Strasbourg. From 1998 to 2011 he was associate professor at the Paris School of Oriental Studies, Institut National des Langues et Civilisations Orientales (INALCO). From 2010 to 2015 he was adjunct professor at the Université Sorbonne Nouvelle. From 2011 to 2015 Bodi was Professor of Hebrew Bible and Semitic Languages at the Paris 8 University Vincennes-Saint-Denis. Since Fall 2015 Bodi is Professor of History of Religions of Antiquity at the Paris-Sorbonne University. Since 2015 Bodi is adjunct professor of Biblical Hebrew at Institut Catholique de Paris.

== Bibliography ==
- Bodi, Daniel (1983). The Yahweh War Accounts (ThD diss. University of Strasbourg).
- Bodi, Daniel (1988). Terminological and Thematic Comparisons Between the Book of Ezekiel and Akkadian Literature With Special Reference to the Poem of Erra (PhD diss. Union Theological Seminary). OCLC 233927995.
- Bodi, Daniel (1996). Poetics of the Book of Ezekiel: Philology, Analogical Hermeneutic and History of Traditions (La poétique du livre d'Ézéchiel: philologie, herméneutique analogique (Habilitation dissertation at the Paris-Sorbonne University).

== Sources ==
- Aitken, James K.; Clines, Jeremy M. S.; Maier, Christl M., eds. (2013). Interested Readers: Essays on the Hebrew Bible in Honor of David J.A. Clines. Society of Biblical Literature. ISBN 9781589839250.
- BAS Library. "Daniel Bodi". Biblical Archaeology Society.
- Zawanowska, Marzena; Wilk, Mateusz, eds. (2021-11-29). The Character of David in Judaism, Christianity and Islam: Warrior, Poet, Prophet and King. Themes in Biblical Narrative. Vol. 29. Brill. doi:10.1163/9789004465978. ISBN 978-90-04-46597-8.
- Daniel BODI. Orient & Méditerranée.
