= Sienno =

Sienno may refer to the following places:

- Sienno, Słupca County in Greater Poland Voivodeship (west-central Poland)
- Sienno, Kuyavian-Pomeranian Voivodeship (north-central Poland)
- Sienno, Masovian Voivodeship (east-central Poland)
- Sienno, Wągrowiec County in Greater Poland Voivodeship (west-central Poland)
- Sienno, Lubusz Voivodeship (west Poland)
- Sienno, West Pomeranian Voivodeship (north-west Poland)
