= Kochan (surname) =

Kochan (Slovak/Czech feminine: Kochanová), also spelled Kokhan (Ukrainian: Кохан), is a surname. Notable people with this surname include:

- Alexis Kochan (born 1953), Ukrainian-Canadian composer and singer
- Craig Kochan (born 1969), Canadian curler
- Dieter Kochan (born 1974), American ice hockey goaltender
- Günter Kochan (1930–2009), German classical composer
- Jacek Kochan (born 1955), Polish musician
- Lionel Kochan (1922–2005), British historian
- Miriam Kochan (1929–2018), English writer and translator
- Nick Kochan, British journalist
- Magdalena Kochan (born 1950), Polish politician
- Matej Kochan (born 1992), Slovak footballer
- Rebekah Kochan (born 1984), American actress
- Thomas Anton Kochan (born 1947), American professor
- Mykhaylo Kokhan (born 2001), Ukrainian athlete
