= Sarah Abrevaya Stein =

American historian

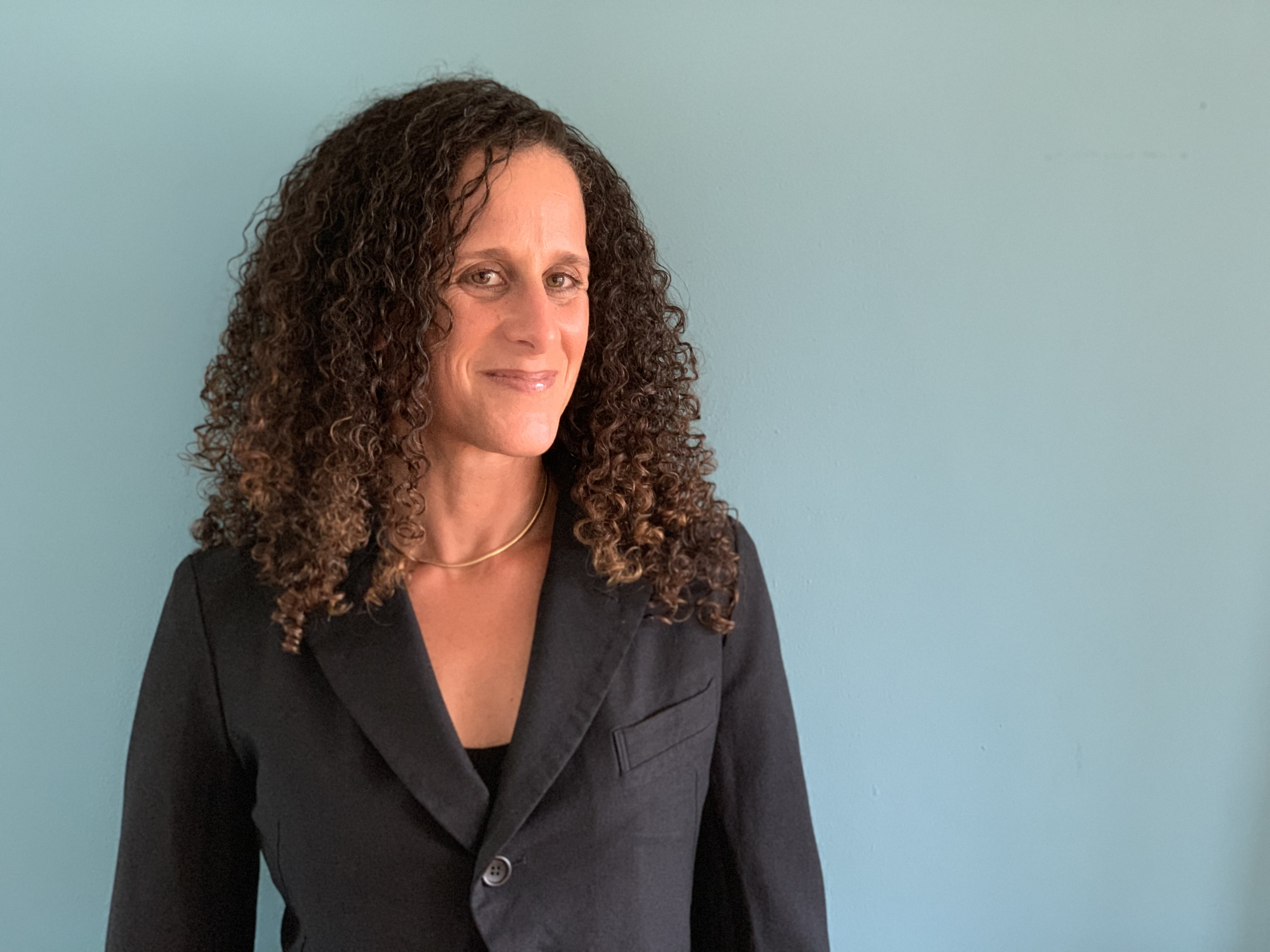
Sarah Abrevaya Stein, 2020

Sarah Abrevaya Stein is an American professor, scholar, and public speaker. A historian of modern Jewish culture, she is the author or editor of ten books. Stein is Distinguished Professor of History and holder of the Viterbi Family Endowed Chair in Mediterranean Jewish Studies at UCLA.

Her books have been lauded for innovative research and artistic craft.The New York Times contributor Matti Friedman wrote that "Stein, a UCLA historian, has ferocious research talents....and a writing voice that is admirably light and human."

== Biography ==
Stein graduated from South Eugene High School, received her B.A. from Brown University, and her Ph.D. from Stanford University.

She is the author or co-editor of more than ten books, including Family Papers: A Sephardic Journey Through the Twentieth Century (2019), which was selected as one of The Economist's "Books of the Year," and Plumes: Ostrich Feathers, Jews, and a Lost World of Global Commerce (2008), which won the Sami Rohr Prize for Jewish Literature. Her scholarship has also expanded historical understanding of the Holocaust in the Middle East and North Africa, and she has edited and translated memoirs and documentary histories that illuminate lesser-studied Jewish experiences in the region. Her work has been translated into multiple languages, including Spanish, French, Hebrew, Russian, and Arabic.

Stein has received many awards including the Salo W. and Jeannette M. Baron Senior Award for Scholarly Excellence in Research of the Jewish Experience from the University of Vienna, the Sami Rohr Prize for Jewish Literature, two National Endowment for the Humanities Fellowships, a Guggenheim Fellowship, two National Jewish Book Awards, three National Jewish Book Award Finalist Awards, Best Historical Materials Award from the American Library Association, Judaica Reference Award from the Association for Jewish Libraries, and the UCLA Distinguished Teaching Award.

She has served as consultant, advisor, and board member for institutions as varied as The Walt Disney Company, Pixar, The World’s Jewish Museum of Tel Aviv, the Skirball Cultural Center, Jewish Story Partners, Facing History & Ourselves, the Amazon Prime television series I Love Dick, and universities around the world. She is a frequent speaker and writer on Jewish diversity.

== Publications ==
- Salonique Juive et Ottoman: Les mémoires de Sa’adi Besalel a-Leviv, French translation of A Jewish Voice by Löic Marcou (Lior Editions, 2024).
- Wartime North Africa: a Documentary History, 1934-1950 co-edited with Aomar Boum (Stanford University Press with the cooperation of the United States Holocaust Memorial Museum, 2023)
- Papeles de familia Spanish translation of Family Papers by Inglés de Vicente Campos González (Galaxia Gutenberg), 2021.
- Family Papers: A Sephardic Journey Through the Twentieth Century (Farrar, Straus and Giroux, 2019)
- The Holocaust and North Africa co-edited with Aomar Boum (Stanford University Press with the cooperation of the United States Holocaust Memorial Museum, 2019)
- Sephardi Lives: A Documentary History, 1700-1950, Julia Phillips Cohen and Sarah Abrevaya Stein, editors (Stanford University Press), 2018).
- Ninette of Sin Street, co-edited with Lia Brozgal and Sarah Abrevaya Stein with translation by Jane Kuntz (Stanford University Press, 2017).
- Extraterritorial Dreams: European Citizenship, Sephardi Jews, and the Ottoman Twentieth Century (University of Chicago Press, 2016)
- Saharan Jews and the Fate of French Algeria, (University of Chicago Press, 2014)).
- A Jewish Voice from Ottoman Salonica: The Ladino Memoir of Sa'adi Besalel a-Levi co-authored with Aron Rodrigue and Isaac Jerusalmi (Stanford University Press, 2012)
- Plumes: ostrich feathers, Jews, and a lost world of global commerce (Yale University Press, 2008)
- Making Jews modern : the Yiddish and Ladino press in the Russian and Ottoman Empires (Indiana University Press, 2004)

== Awards ==
- 2025: Salo W. and Jeanette M. Senior Scholar Award for Scholarly Excellence in Research on the Jewish Experience, University of Vienna
- 2023: Best Historical Materials, American Library Association, Awarded for Wartime North Africa
- 2023: Best Reference Award, Association for Jewish Libraries, Awarded for Wartime North Africa
- 2019: National Jewish Book Award Finalist for Family Papers
- 2018: National Jewish Book Award Finalist in the Sephardic Culture category, for The Holocaust and North Africa
- 2017: National Jewish Book Award in the Sephardic Culture category for Extraterritorial Dreams: European Citizenship, Sephardi Jews, and the Ottoman Twentieth Century
- 2014: National Jewish Book Awards in the Sephardic Culture Category for Sephardi Lives: A Documentary History, 1700-1950
