= Wysokie Dęby =

- Village
- Location within Poland
- Coordinates: 52°27′02″N 14°58′21″E
- Country: Poland
- Voivodeship: Lubusz
- County: Słubice
- Gmina: Ośno Lubuskie
- Population: 10

Wysokie Dęby [vɨˈsɔkʲɛ ˈdɛmbɨ] is a village in the administrative district of Gmina Ośno Lubuskie, within Słubice County, Lubusz Voivodeship, in western Poland.
