= Połęcko, Słubice County =

Połęcko
- Village
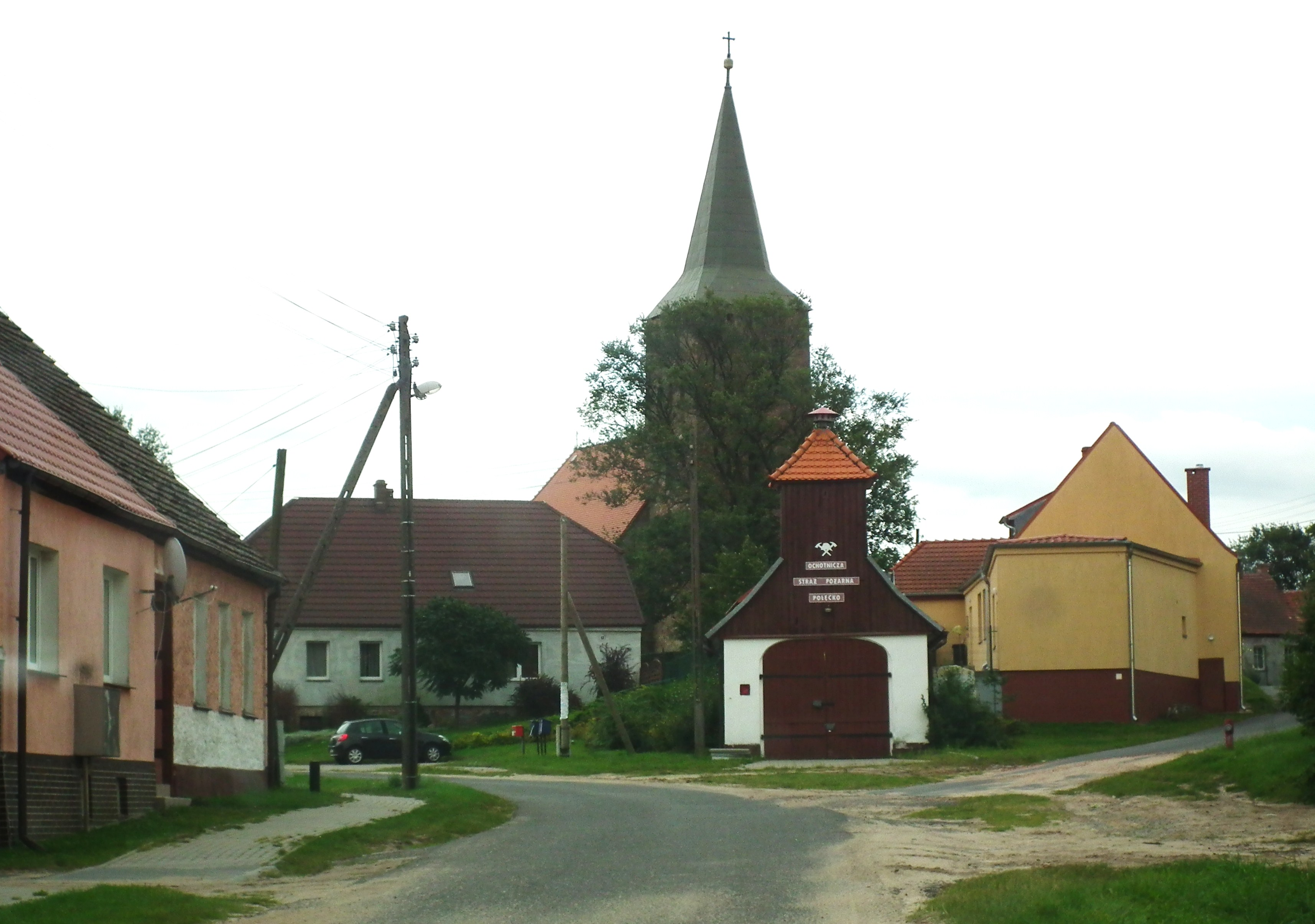

- Location within Poland
- Coordinates: 52°25′N 14°54′E
- Country: Poland
- Voivodeship: Lubusz
- County: Słubice
- Gmina: Ośno Lubuskie
- Population: 300

Połęcko ([pɔˈwɛnt͡skɔ]; German: Polenzig) is a village in the administrative district of Gmina Ośno Lubuskie, within Słubice County, Lubusz Voivodeship, in western Poland.
