= Świniary, Słubice County =

Świniary
- Village
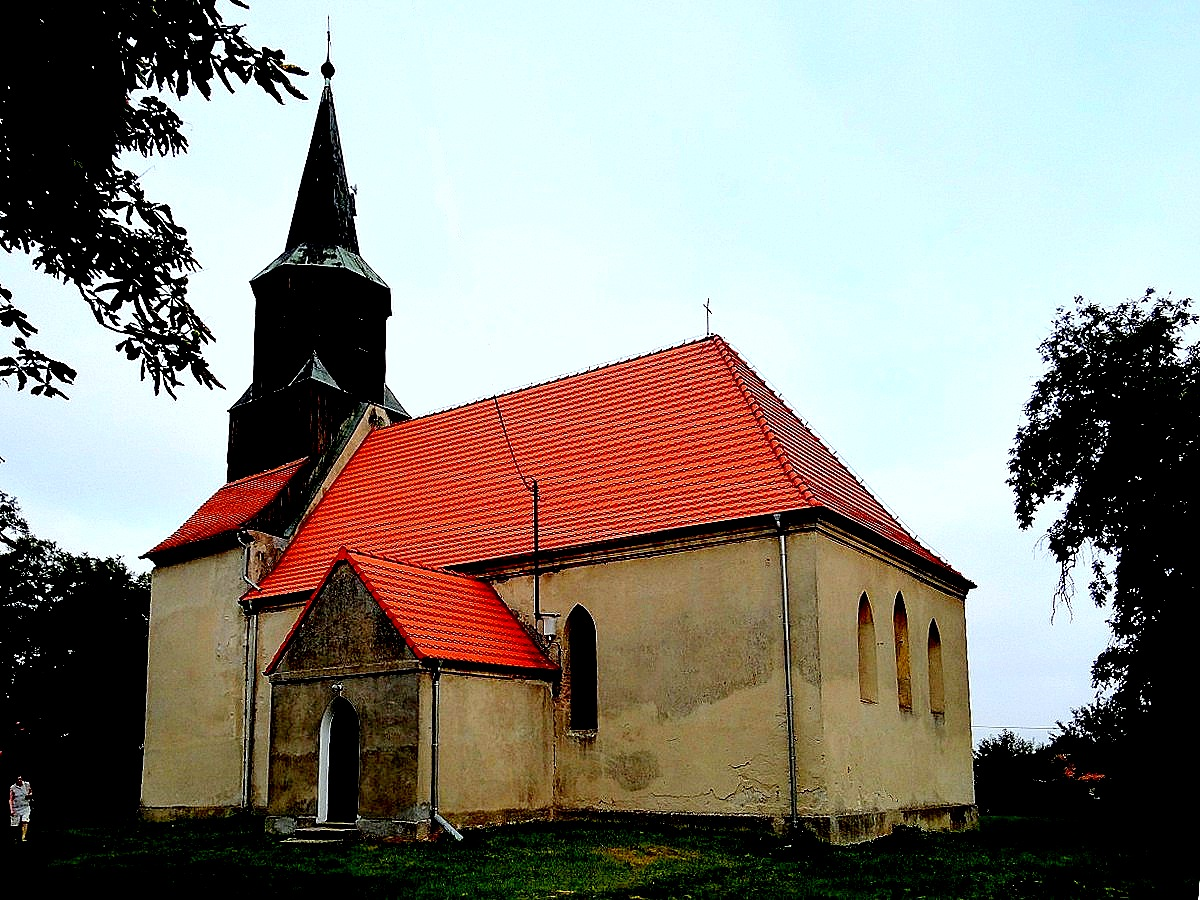
- Catholic church

- Location within Poland
- Coordinates: 52°26′13″N 14°49′5″E
- Country: Poland
- Voivodeship: Lubusz
- County: Słubice
- Gmina: Ośno Lubuskie
- Population: 220

Świniary [ɕfiˈɲarɨ] is a village in the administrative district of Gmina Ośno Lubuskie, within Słubice County, Lubusz Voivodeship, in western Poland.
