= Lubień, Lubusz Voivodeship =

Lubień
- Village
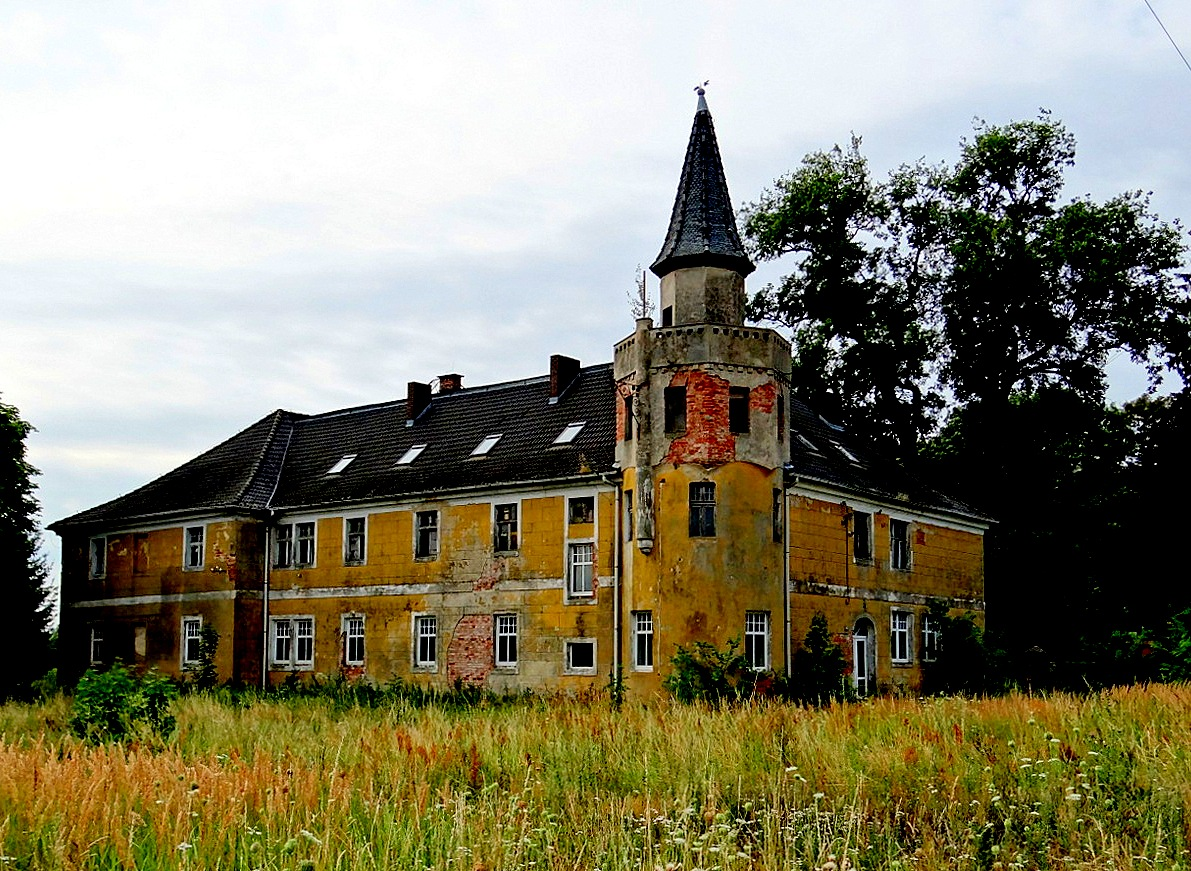
- Palace

- Location within Poland
- Coordinates: 52°24′58″N 14°59′24″E
- Country: Poland
- Voivodeship: Lubusz
- County: Słubice
- Gmina: Ośno Lubuskie
- Population: 260

Lubień (Polish pronunciation: [ˈlubjɛj̃]) is a village in the administrative district of Gmina Ośno Lubuskie, within Słubice County, Lubusz Voivodeship, in western Poland.
