= Rosławice =

- Village
- Location within Poland
- Coordinates: 52°25′53″N 14°53′29″E
- Country: Poland
- Voivodeship: Lubusz
- County: Słubice
- Gmina: Ośno Lubuskie
- Population: 10

Rosławice [rɔswaˈvit͡sɛ] is a village in the administrative district of Gmina Ośno Lubuskie, within Słubice County, Lubusz Voivodeship, in western Poland.
