= Gmina Ośno Lubuskie =

Gmina Ośno Lubuskie Ośno Lubuskie Commune
- Gmina
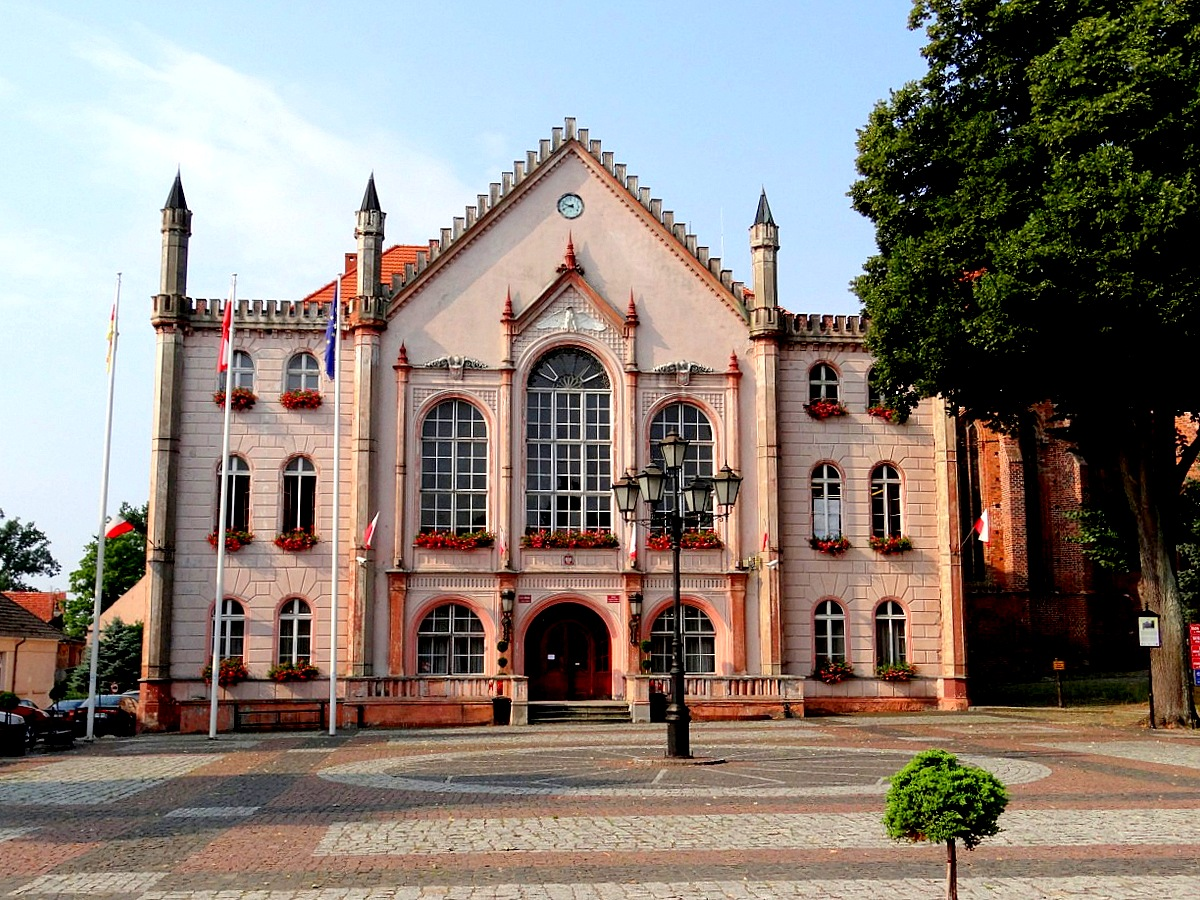
- Town Hall in Ośno Lubuskie, seat of the gmina office

- Flag
- Interactive map of Gmina Ośno Lubuskie
- Coordinates (Ośno Lubuskie): 52°27′19″N 14°52′37″E
- Country: Poland
- Voivodeship: Lubusz
- County: Słubice
- Seat: Ośno Lubuskie

Area
  - Total: 197.97 km^{2} (76.44 sq mi)

Population (2019-06-30)
  - Total: 6,426
  - Density: 32.46/km^{2} (84.07/sq mi)
  - Urban: 3,951
  - Rural: 2,475
- Time zone: UTC+1 (CET)
  - Summer (DST): UTC+2 (CEST)
- Vehicle registration: FSL
- Website: http://osno.pl/

Gmina Ośno Lubuskie is an urban-rural gmina (administrative district) in Słubice County, Lubusz Voivodeship, in western Poland. Its seat is the town of Ośno Lubuskie, which lies approximately 25 kilometres (16 mi) north-east of Słubice, 40 km (25 mi) south-west of Gorzów Wielkopolski, and 72 km (45 mi) north-west of Zielona Góra.

The gmina covers an area of 197.97 square kilometres (76.4 sq mi), and as of 2019 its total population is 6,426.

== Villages ==
Apart from the town of Ośno Lubuskie, Gmina Ośno Lubuskie contains the villages and settlements of Grabno, Gronów, Kochań, Lipienica, Lubień, Podośno, Połęcko, Radachów, Rosławice, Sienno, Smogóry, Świniary, Trześniów and Wysokie Dęby.

== Neighbouring gminas ==
Gmina Ośno Lubuskie is bordered by the gminas of Górzyca, Krzeszyce, Rzepin, Słońsk, Sulęcin and Torzym.

== Twin towns – sister cities ==
Gmina Ośno Lubuskie is twinned with:

- Aalborg, Denmark
- Eichwalde, Germany
