= Gronów, Słubice County =

Gronów
- Village
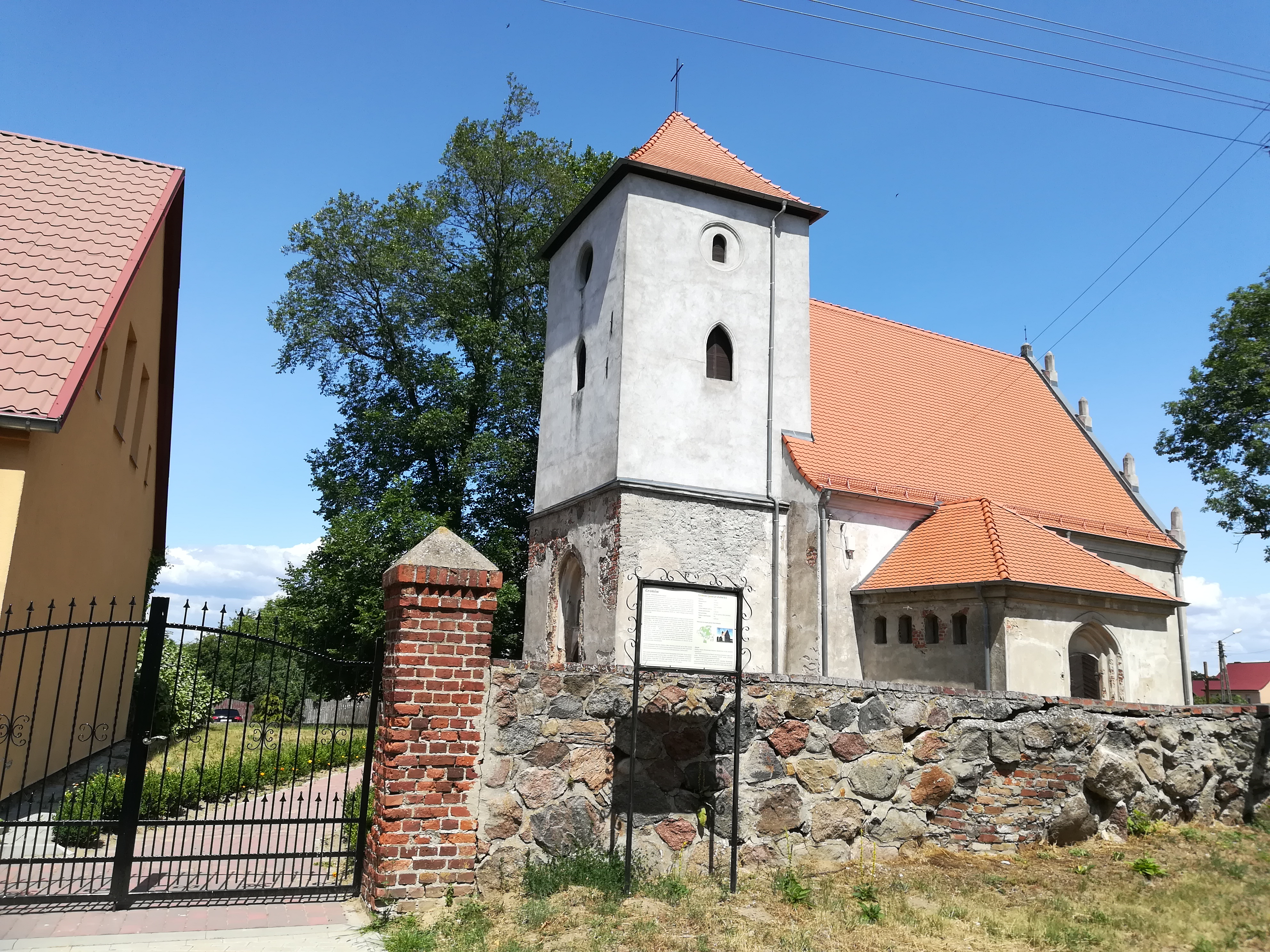
- Catholic church

- Location within Poland
- Coordinates: 52°29′30″N 14°49′48″E
- Country: Poland
- Voivodeship: Lubusz
- County: Słubice
- Gmina: Ośno Lubuskie
- Population: 130

Gronów [ˈɡrɔnuf] is a village in the administrative district of Gmina Ośno Lubuskie, within Słubice County, Lubusz Voivodeship, in western Poland.
