= Trześniów, Lubusz Voivodeship =

Trześniów
- Village
- Location within Poland
- Coordinates: 52°28′40″N 14°57′37″E
- Country: Poland
- Voivodeship: Lubusz
- County: Słubice
- Gmina: Ośno Lubuskie
- Population: 170

Trześniów [ˈtʂɛɕɲuf] is a village in the administrative district of Gmina Ośno Lubuskie, within Słubice County, Lubusz Voivodeship, in western Poland.
