= Smogóry =

- Village
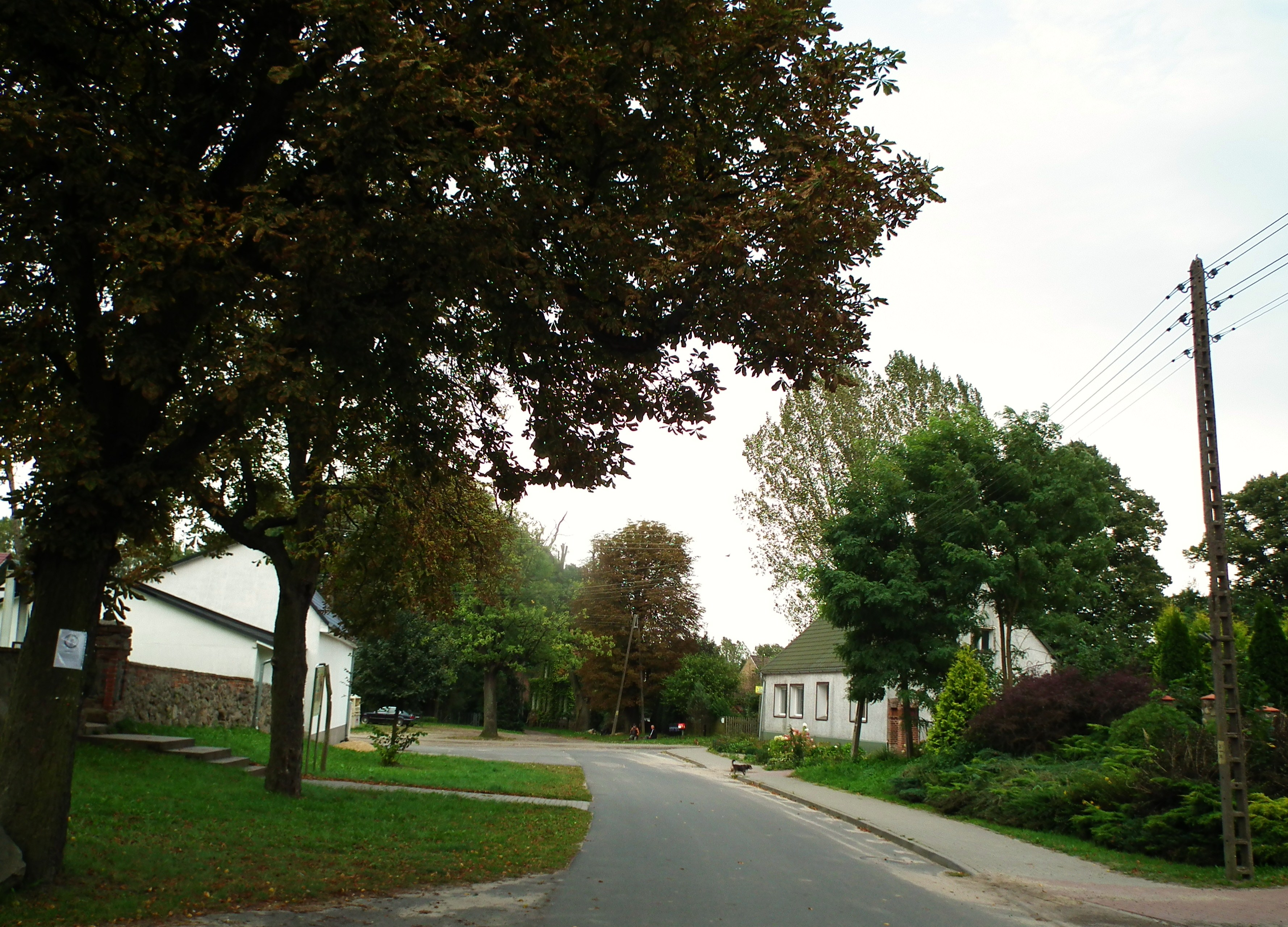

- Location within Poland
- Coordinates: 52°26′N 15°0′E
- Country: Poland
- Voivodeship: Lubusz
- County: Słubice
- Gmina: Ośno Lubuskie
- Population: 750

Smogóry [smɔˈɡurɨ] is a village in the administrative district of Gmina Ośno Lubuskie, within Słubice County, Lubusz Voivodeship, in western Poland.
