= The Jews of the Balkans =

Juifs des Balkans, Espaces judéo-ibériques, XVIe-XXe siècles is a 1993 French-language academic book by Esther Benbassa and Aron Rodrigue, published by La Découverte. The work is about the Sephardic Jews. There are two English editions: the first, The Jews of the Balkans: The Judeo-Spanish Community, 15th to 20th Centuries, an abridged translation, was published in 1995 by Blackwell Publishing. A more complete translation, titled Sephardi Jewry: A History of the Judeo-Spanish Community, 14th-20th Centuries, was published in 2000 by the University of California Press. The French edition had an updated revision published in 2002, Histoire des Juifs sépharades. De Tolède à Salonique, published by Editions Points.

According to Bruce Rosenstock, the versions of the work collectively became "the basic source for the social and cultural history" of the group.

== Contents ==
The 2000 English version includes content on the initial history of the group; this content is not present in the 1995 book.
