= Ośno Lubuskie =

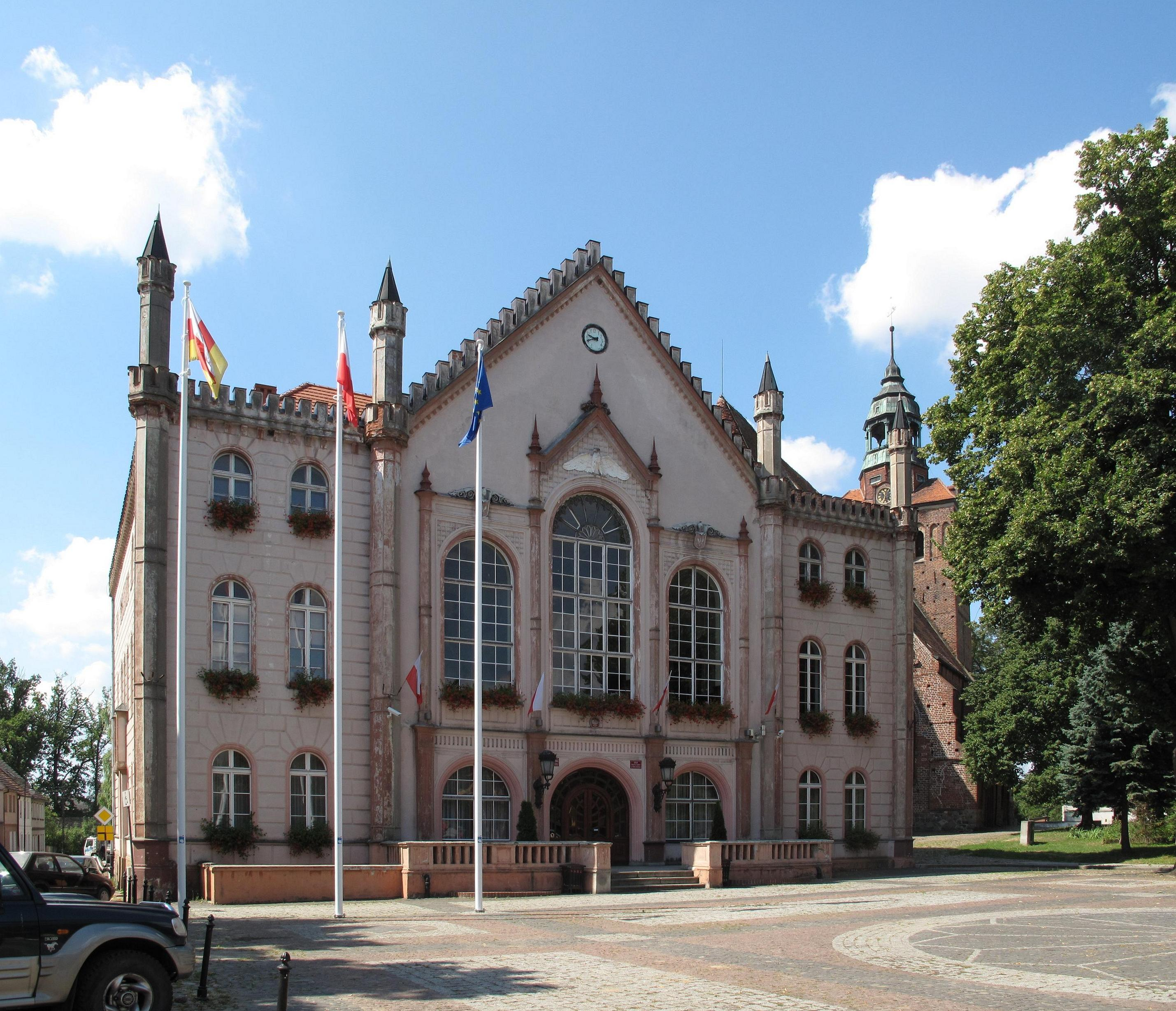
- Town hall in Ośno Lubuskie

- Flag Coat of arms

- Location within Poland
- Coordinates: 52°27′08″N 14°52′39″E
- Country: Poland
- Voivodeship: Lubusz
- County: Słubice
- Gmina: Ośno Lubuskie

Area
  - Total: 8.01 km^{2} (3.09 sq mi)

Population (2019-06-30)
  - Total: 3,951
  - Density: 493/km^{2} (1,280/sq mi)
- Time zone: UTC+1 (CET)
  - Summer (DST): UTC+2 (CEST)
- Postal code: 69-220
- Vehicle registration: FSL
- Website: http://www.osno.pl

Ośno Lubuskie [ˈɔɕnɔ luˈbuskʲɛ] (German: Drossen) is a town in Słubice County, Lubusz Voivodeship, in western Poland. It has 3,951 inhabitants (2019).

== Geography ==
Ośno Lubuskie is located near the river Łęcza and the lake Reczynek. It is located in the historic Lubusz Land.

== History ==
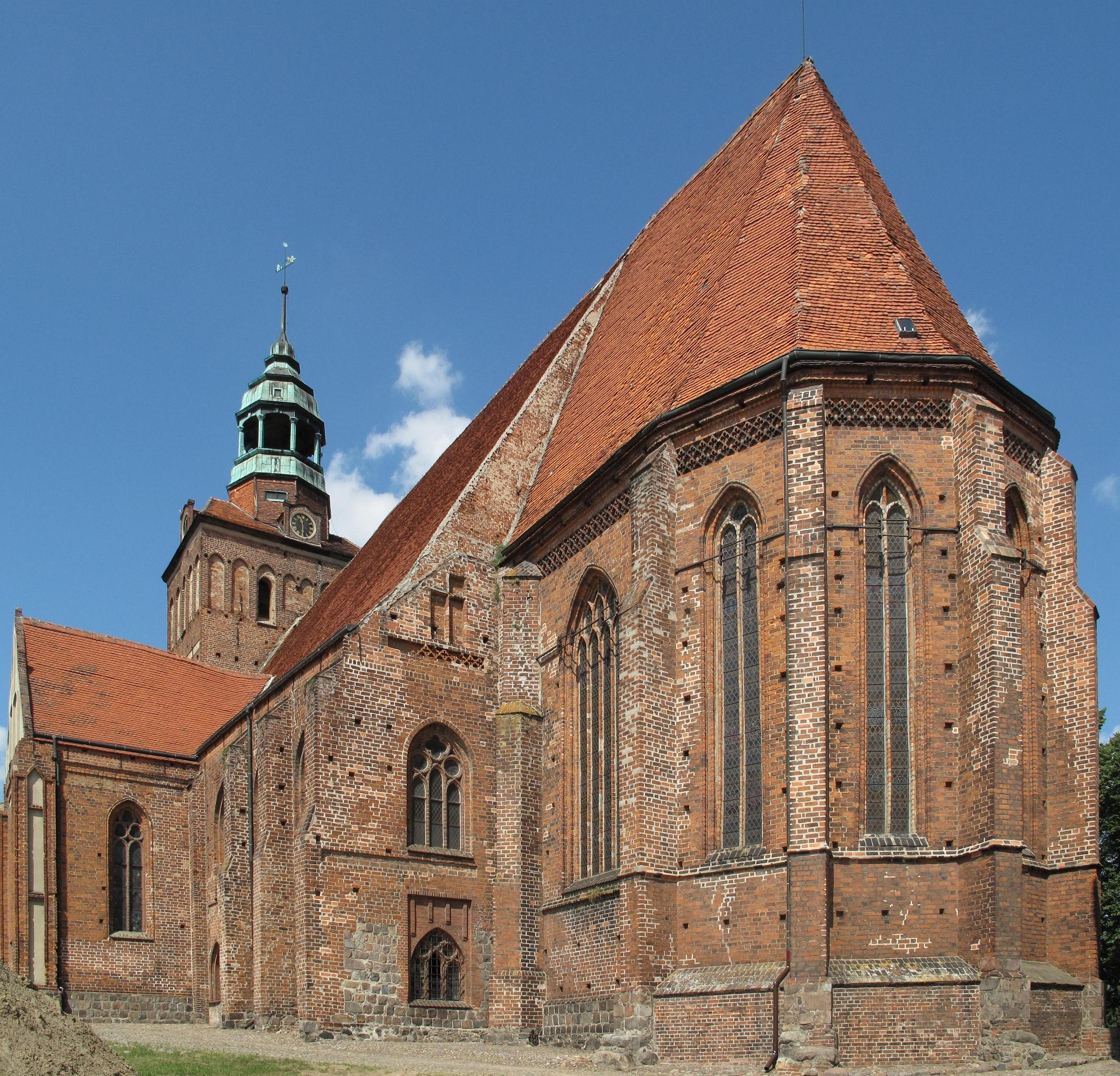
Gothic Saint James church

In the Early Middle Ages the area was inhabited by Lubuszanie, one of the Polish tribes, and in the 10th century it became part of the emerging Polish state under the Piast dynasty. In the early Piast period, a fortified settlement existed nearby the present-day town and the area formed part of the Lubusz castellany within the Kingdom of Poland until the mid-13th century. Ośno Lubuskie was mentioned for the first time in 1252, in Latin, as "civitas forensi Osna". The name is of Slavic origin and is derived from the word osa/osina. The town privileges were received in 1282 from the bishops of Lubusz and the first mayor of the town was Dzierżko of Chyciny.

Initially, Ośno was owned by the Bishops of Lubusz, and since 1258 by the Brandenburg margraves. After a war broke out over control of the region in 1319, the area came under Polish rule again, as part of the Duchy of Ścinawa. John, Duke of Ścinawa visited the town in 1322. The area fell again under Brandenburg suzerainty in the following years and the bishops officially gave the town to Brandenburg in 1401. Prior to 1347 Ośno received full civic rights and in 1369 it received the right to mint its own coins. Initially it was a fortified trading settlement, but over the time it evolved into a town. From 1373 to 1415 the town was part of the Czech (Bohemian) Crown Lands. In the late Middle Ages Ośno became the center of the Torzym Land, part of the larger Lubusz Land, and became a county seat in 1447.

Polish troops marched through the town in 1657 and in 1674–1675 Swedish troops were stationed in the town. In 1711 Saxon troops marched through the town and from 1758 to 1760 the town was occupied by Russia.

The city was on fire several times and has survived wars and pestilence. Before the war Drossen was famous for its beer produced in the Drossen brewery, and for flower plantations, as well as its asparagus and currants.

During the final stages of World War II, the Germans evacuated the town's populace in January 1945. Due to heavy bombing and battles nearby, the town was left 70% destroyed and on 1 February 1945 it was captured by the Red Army. After Germany's defeat in World War II, the town became again part of Poland and was repopulated with Poles, the majority of whom were displaced from former eastern Poland annexed by the Soviet Union, while some were also former forced laborers returning from Germany, as well as settlers from Romania and central Poland. The historic name Ośno was restored with the adjective Lubuskie added after the Lubusz Land, in which it is located, to distinguish it from other settlement of the same name.

== Monuments ==
Medieval town walls of Ośno Lubuskie

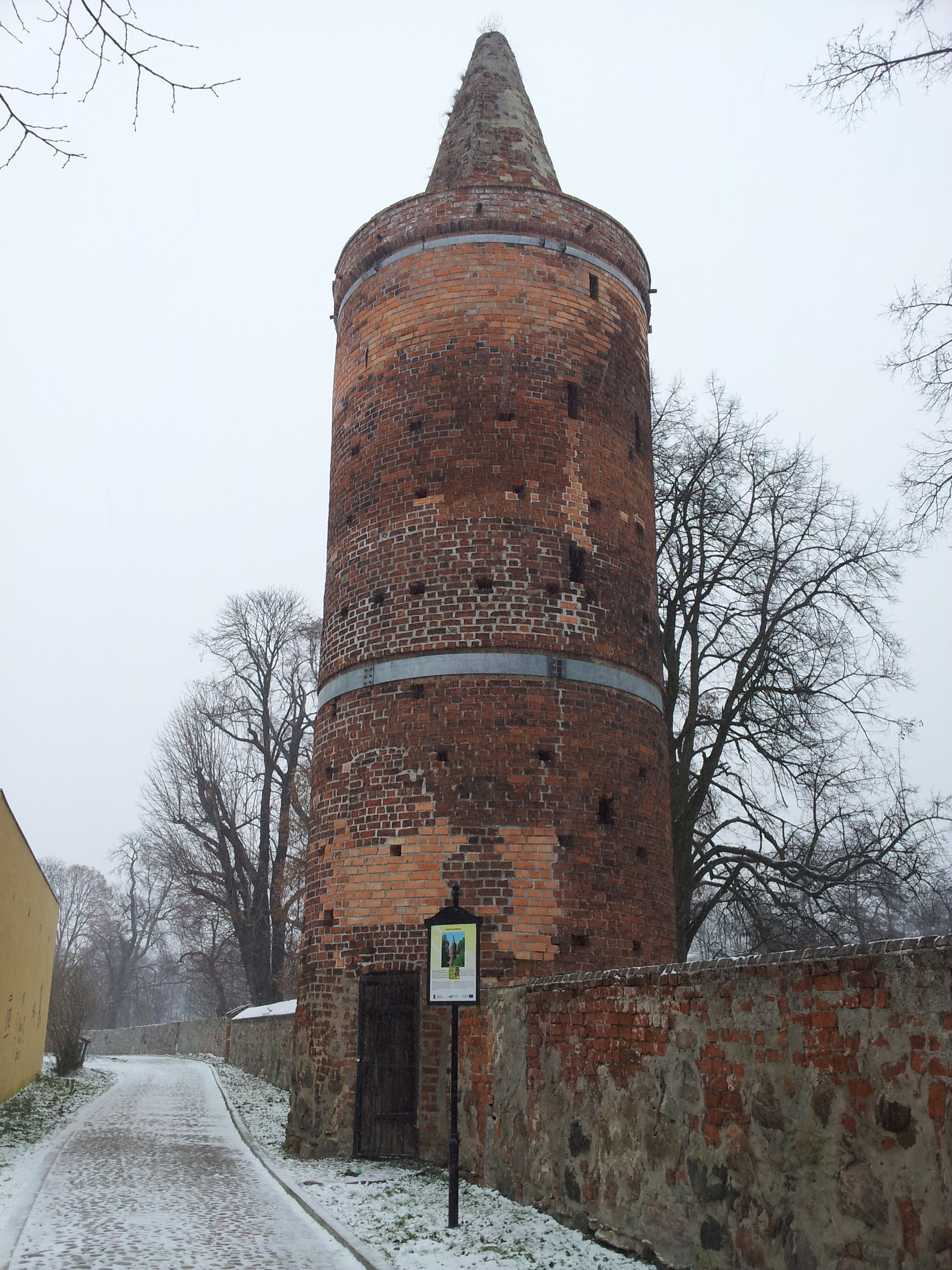
Baszta Krzaków

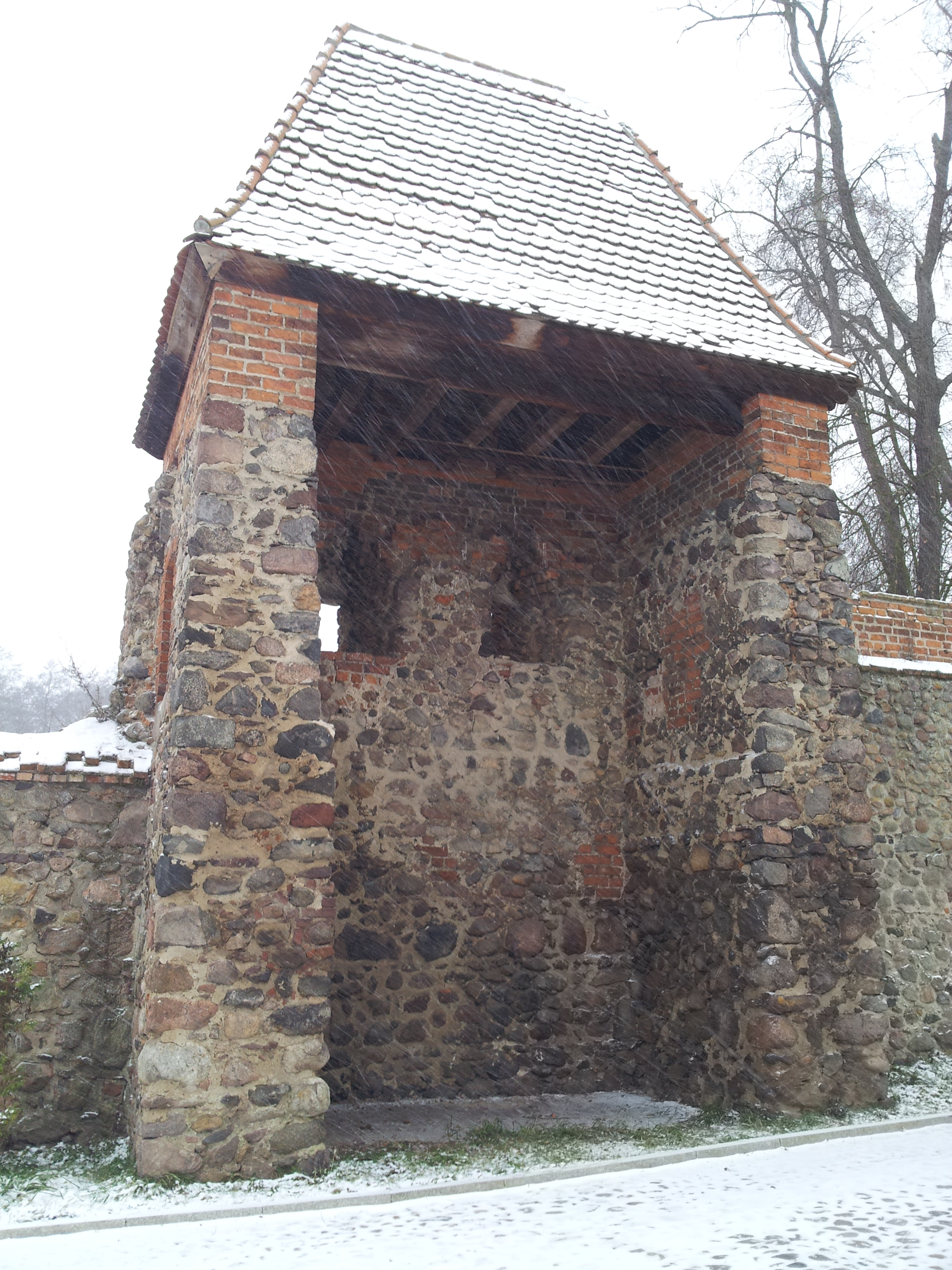
Baszta Kapłańska

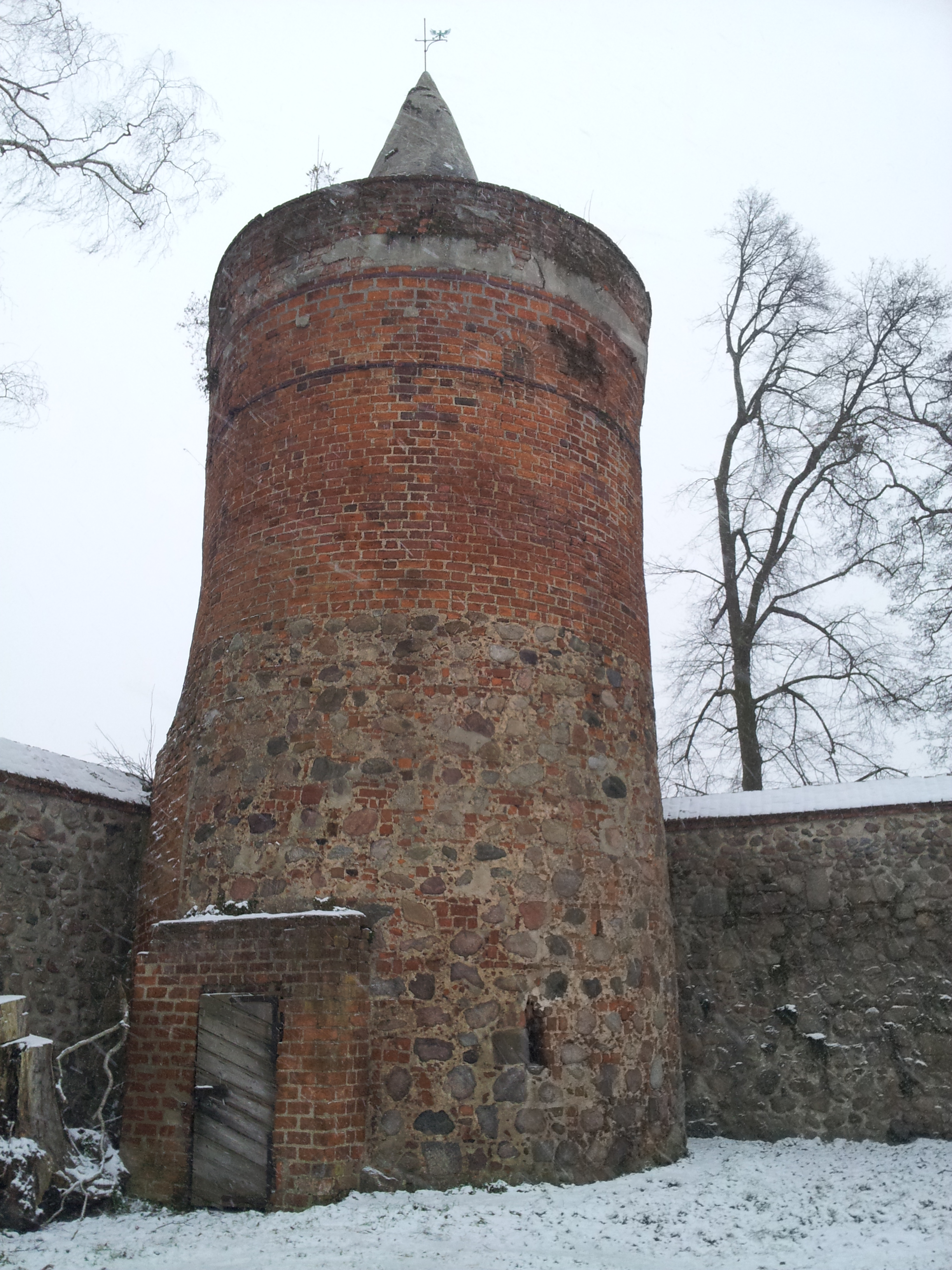
Baszta Złodziejska

There are several historical monuments in the town. These include:

- The Parish Church of St. Jacob, with its Gothic architecture, dating back to the 14th century. It is the oldest building in the city.
- Church belonging to the Nowoapostolski Municipality.
- Cemetery chapel of St. Gertrude, late Gothic from the mid-fifteenth century.
- Defensive walls from the 15th century. The medieval city walls were erected in 1477, which provided 12 towers. The walls surround the city at 1,350 meters in length.
- City Hall, neo-Gothic, designed by architect Emil Flaminius.
- Synagogue
- The Old Synagogue
- Jewish cemetery
- Tenements in the city center dating back to the 18th century

== Sports ==
The town's football club is Spójnia Ośno Lubuskie, founded in 1948. It competes in the lower leagues.

== Twin towns – sister cities ==
See twin towns of Gmina Ośno Lubuskie.
