= Miriam Kochan =

English history writer and French translator

- Born: Miriam Louise Buchler; 5 October 1929; Hendon, London, England
- Died: 1 January 2018 (aged 88); London, England
- Occupations: History writer; Translator
- Years active: 1950–2017
- Spouse: Lionel Kochan (m. 1951; died 2005)
- Children: 3

Miriam Louise Kochan (née Buchler; 5 October 1929 – 1 January 2018) was an English history writer and translator of French. An economics graduate of the University College of the South West, she was the first female graduate of the Reuters news agency, working as sub-editor of the Reuters Economic Services from 1950 to 1954. Kochan was the translator of some 20 books that were originally published in French and she was the author of six books on popular history. In 1970, she introduced the bat mitzvah class for girls who were aged 12 and over in the British orthodox Jewish community and taught at Carmel College, Oxfordshire.

== Early life ==
Kochan was born in Hendon, North London, on 5 October 1929. She was the daughter of the guide lecturer Martin Buchler and his wife Bessie Buchler (née Bradlaw), who were both the children of rabbis from Central and Eastern Europe. Kochan's paternal grandfather was the rabbi Adolf Büchler, who was the principal of Jews' College, while her maternal grandfather was a tour guide. She studied at the Copthall County Grammar School, excelling in literature and languages. Kochan's mother died when she was 15 and cared for her father. Guided by her father, she studied an external bachelor of science economics degree at the University College of the South West in London (today the University of Exeter).

== Career ==
Following graduation, Kochan became the first female graduate of the Reuters news agency. She was the sub-editor of the Reuters Economic Services from 1950 to 1954, and was promoted from editorial assistant to journalist. Kochan became an freelance writer in 1954, moving to Edinburgh in 1959, then Norwich in 1964 and finally Oxford in 1969.

Kochan was a translator of some 20 books that were originally published in French. She was the translator of the books such as Greece by Jeanne Roux and Georges Roux in 1958, Gothic Cathedrals of France by Marcel Aubert in 1959, Maya Cities by Paul Rivet in 1960, The World of Archaeology by Marcel Brion in 1961, Carthage by Gilbert Picard in 1964, The Greek Adventure by Pierre Lévêque and Mekji by Paul Akamatsu in 1968. Other translations Kochan carried out were Capitalism and Material Life by Fernand Braudel in 1972, the third volume of History of Anti-Semitism by Léon Poliakov in 1975, The Jewish Bankers and the Holy See by Poliakov in 1977, The Norm of Truth by Pascal Engel in 1991 helped by the author, Anti-Semitism in France by Pierre Birnbaum in 1992, A Social History of France in the 19th Century by Christophe Charle in 1994 and Haim Nahun by Esther Benbassa in 1995. She was the author of six popular history books. These books were Life in Russia Under Catherine the Great in 1969, was editor of The Jewish Family Album with her husband Lionel Kochan in 1975, Catherine the Great and The Last Days of Imperial Russia both in 1976, Prisoners of England in 1980 and Britain's Internees in the Second World War in 1983. Kochan's final two books were compiled with eyewitness accounts and personal testimony. She was the Oxford correspondent for The Jewish Chronicle, and was the assistant sub-editor of the historical studies journal Past & Present from 1977 to 1980.

She was the secretary of the Edinburgh Jewish Literary Society and taught at Carmel College, Oxfordshire. Kochan was heavily involved with the Oxford Jewish Community and eventually became its president. and introduced the O-level syllabus (later GCSE) to the cheder (Hebrew class) in Oxford and she began the bat mitzvah class for girls who were aged 12 and over in the British orthodox Jewish community in 1970 after overcoming resistance from conservative elements. She also introduced children's services, the synagogue magazine Menorah and a post bar/bat mitzvah class, and had organisational roles with the B'nai B'rith and the Women's International Zionist Organization. Kochan began a local Judaism study group, spoke about Judaism with non-Jewish groups, kiddush bookings and organised the Friendship Club.

== Personal life ==
She was married to the historian Lionel Kochan from 23 December 1951 to his death in 2005. They had three children. Kochan died on 1 January 2018.
