= Grabno, Lubusz Voivodeship =

Grabno
- Village
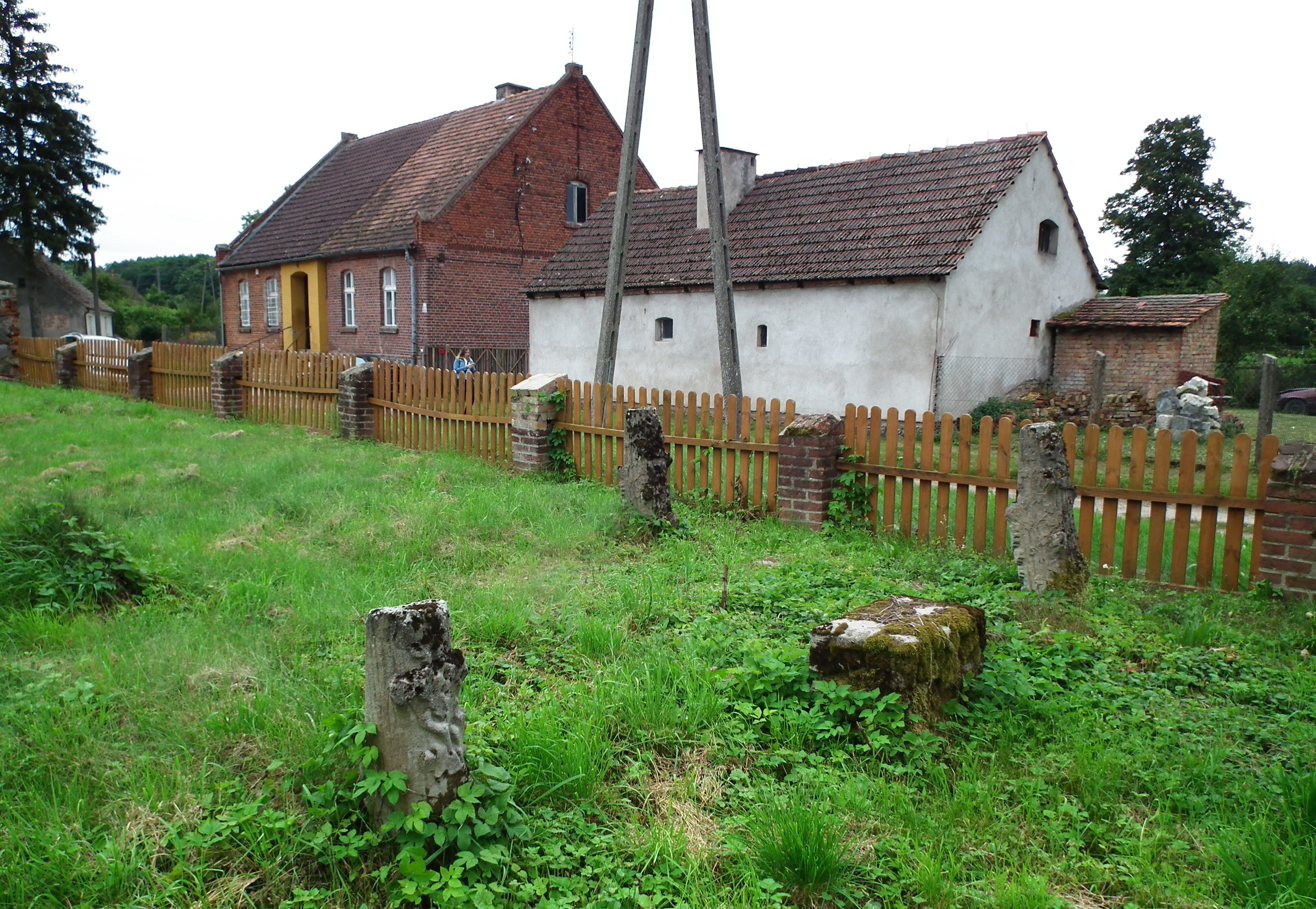

- Location within Poland
- Coordinates: 52°26′N 14°56′E
- Country: Poland
- Voivodeship: Lubusz
- County: Słubice
- Gmina: Ośno Lubuskie
- Population: 170

Grabno [ˈɡrabnɔ] is a village in the administrative district of Gmina Ośno Lubuskie, within Słubice County, Lubusz Voivodeship, in western Poland.
