= Habilitation =

Postdoctoral degree

Habilitation is the highest university degree, or the procedure by which it is achieved, in Germany, France, Italy, Poland, Romania and some other European and non-English-speaking countries. The candidate fulfills a university's set criteria of excellence in research, teaching, and further education, which usually includes a second dissertation.

The degree, sometimes abbreviated dr. habil. (doctor habilitatus), dr. hab. (doktor habilitowany), or D.Sc. (Doctor of Sciences in Poland and some CIS countries), is often a qualification for full professorship in those countries.

In German-speaking countries it allows the degree holder to bear the title PD (for Privatdozent). In a number of countries there exists an academic post of docent, appointment to which often requires such a qualification. The degree conferral is usually accompanied by a public oral defence event (a lecture or a colloquium) with one or more opponents. The habilitation thesis is intended to demonstrate that the author has mastered their field in its entirety. For this reason, it is usually written on a topic that is very different from the subject of the doctoral dissertation. Unlike doctoral theses, which must be published by law in Germany, many habilitation theses remain unpublished.

Habilitation is usually awarded 5–15 years after a PhD degree or its equivalent. Achieving this academic degree does not automatically give the scientist a paid position, though many people who apply for the degree already have steady university employment.

== History and etymology ==
The term habilitation is derived from the Medieval Latin habilitare, meaning "to make suitable, to fit", from Classical Latin habilis "fit, proper, skillful". The degree developed in the Holy Roman Empire of the German Nation in the seventeenth century (c. 1652). Initially, habilitation was synonymous with "doctoral qualification". The term became synonymous with "post-doctoral qualification" in Germany in the 19th century "when holding a doctorate seemed no longer sufficient to guarantee a proficient transfer of knowledge to the next generation". Afterwards, it became normal in the German university system to write two doctoral theses: the inaugural thesis (Inauguraldissertation), completing a course of study, and the habilitation thesis (Habilitationsschrift), which opens the road to a professorship.

Since the early 21st century, the habilitation is no longer mandatory for appointment to a professorship in Germany. Since then, there have been major differences between the various disciplines. While the habilitation remains common in most humanities and in medical research, it has become the exception in many natural sciences.

== Process ==
A habilitation thesis can be either cumulative (based on previous research, be it articles or monographs) or monographical, i.e., a specific, unpublished thesis, which then tends to be very long. While cumulative habilitations are predominant in some fields (such as medicine), they have been, since about a century ago, almost unheard of in others (such as law).

The level of scholarship of a habilitation is considerably higher than for a doctoral dissertation in the same academic tradition in terms of quality and quantity, and must be accomplished independently, without direction or guidance of a faculty supervisor. In the sciences, publication of numerous (sometimes ten or more) research articles is required during the habilitation period of about four to ten years. In the humanities, a major book publication may be a prerequisite for defense.

It is possible to get a professorship without habilitation, if the search committee attests the candidate to have qualifications equaling those of a habilitation and the higher-ranking bodies (the university's senate and the country's ministry of education) approve. However, while some subjects make liberal use of this (e.g., the natural sciences in order to employ candidates from countries with different systems and the arts to employ active artists), in other subjects it is rarely done.

The habilitation is awarded after a public lecture, to be held after the thesis has been accepted, and after which the venia legendi (Latin: 'permission to read', i.e., to lecture) is bestowed. In some areas, such as law, philosophy, theology and sociology, the venia, and thus the habilitation, is given only for certain sub-fields (such as criminal law, civil law, or philosophy of science, practical philosophy, etc.); in others, for the entire field.

Although disciplines and countries vary in the typical number of years for obtaining habilitation after getting a doctorate, it usually takes longer than for the American academic tenure. For example, in Poland until 2018, the statutory time for getting a habilitation (traditionally, although not obligatorily, relying on a book publication) is eight years. Theoretically, if an assistant professor does not succeed in obtaining habilitation in this time, they should be moved to a position of a lecturer, with a much higher teaching load and no research obligations, or even be dismissed. In practice, however, on many occasions schools extend the deadlines for habilitation for most scholars if they do not make it in time, and there is evidence that they are able to finish it in the near future.

=== Austria ===
In Austria, the procedure is currently regulated by national law (Austrian University Act UG2002 §103). The graduation process includes additionally to the sub-commission of the senate (including students representatives for a hearing on the teaching capabilities of the candidate) an external reviewer. Holding a habilitation allows academics to do research and supervise (PhD, MSc, ...) on behalf of this university. As it is an academic degree, this is even valid if the person is not enrolled (or not enrolled anymore) at this institution (Habilitation ad personam). Appointment to a full professorship with an international finding commission includes a venia docendi (UG2002 §98(12)), which is restricted to the time of the appointment (UG2002 §98(13) – Habilitation ad positionem).

While the habilitation ensures the rights of the independent research and the supervision, it is on behalf of the statute of the universities to give those rights also to, e.g., associate professors without habilitation. As of 2014 the major Austrian universities do that only for master's level students, but not for PhD programs.

=== Brazil ===
Livre-docência (Livre-docência) is a title (similar to Habilitation in Germany) granted to holders of doctorate degrees upon submission of a cumulative thesis followed by a viva voce examination. It has practically disappeared amongst Brazilian Federal HEIs. It is still required at a few institutions for admissions as a full professor (professor titular), most notably in the three state universities of the state of São Paulo, as well as at the Federal University of São Paulo (UNIFESP).

=== France ===
The degree of Docteur d'État (State Doctor) or Doctorat d'État (State Doctorate), called Doctorat ès lettres (Doctor of Letters) or Doctorat ès sciences (Doctor of Sciences) before the 1950s, formerly awarded by universities in France had a somewhat similar purpose. In 1984, the Doctorat d'État was replaced by the Habilitation à diriger des recherches (literally: Habilitation to Supervise Research).

The award of the French habilitation is a general requirement for being the main supervisor of PhD students and to be eligible for full professor positions. The official eligibility named qualification is granted by the French Conseil National des Universités (CNU). Members of Directeur de Recherche corps who are assimilated to full professors by the CNU do not require the French habilitation to supervise PhD students. Depending on the field, the French habilitation requires consistent research from five to ten years after appointment as an associate professor (maître de conférences), a substantial amount of significant publications, the supervision of at least one PhD student from start to graduation, and/or a successful track record securing extramural funding as a principal investigator, as well as a sound, ambitious, and feasible five-year research project. Outstanding postdoctoral researchers who are not yet appointed to a university could also obtain the habilitation if they meet the requirements. The French habilitation committee is constituted by a majority of external and sometimes foreign referees. The French habilitation entitles associate professors (maîtres de conférences) to apply for full professor positions (professeur des universités).

=== Germany ===
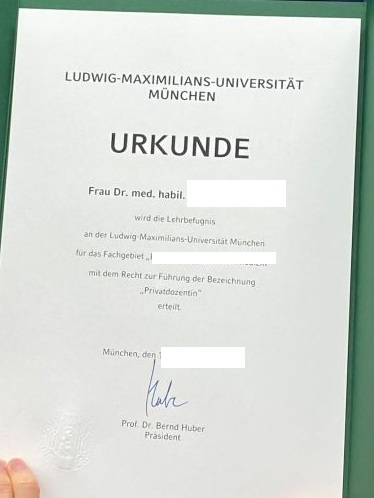
Habilitation Certificate from LMU Munich

In order to hold the rank of a full professor (W3) within the German university system, it is necessary to have obtained the habilitation (or "habilitation-equivalent achievements"). This can be demonstrated by leading a research group, being a junior professor, or other achievements in research and teaching as a post-doctoral researcher. The habilitation in Germany is usually earned after several years of independent research and teaching, either "internally" while working at a university or "externally" as a research and teaching-oriented practitioner. Once the habilitation thesis (Habilitationsschrift, often simply Habilitation) and all other requirements are completed, the candidate (called Habilitand/in in German) "has habilitated him- or herself" and receives an extension to his/her doctoral degree, namely Dr. habil. (with the specification, such as Dr. rer. nat. habil.). The habilitation is thus an additional qualification at a higher level than the German doctoral degree. Only those candidates receiving the highest (or second-highest) grade for their doctoral thesis are encouraged to proceed with a habilitation.

A typical procedure after completing the habilitation is that the successful researcher officially receives the so-called Venia legendi (Latin for "permission for lecturing") for a specific academic subject at universities (sometimes also referred to as Venia docendi, Latin for "right of teaching"). Someone in possession of the Venia legendi but not a professorship has the right to carry the title Privatdozent (for men) or Privatdozentin (for women), abbreviated PD or Priv.-Doz. The status as a PD requires doing some (generally unpaid) teaching in order to keep the title (Titellehre or titular teaching).

==== German habilitation debate ====
In 2004, the habilitation was the subject of a major political debate in Germany. The former Federal Minister for Education and Science, Edelgard Bulmahn, aimed to abolish the system of the habilitation and replace it with the alternative concept of the junior professor: a researcher should first be employed for up to six years as a "junior professor" (a non-tenured position roughly equivalent to assistant professor in the United States) and so prove their suitability for holding a tenured professorship.

Many, especially researchers in the natural sciences, as well as young researchers, have long demanded the abandonment of the habilitation as they think it to be an unnecessary and time-consuming obstacle in an academic career, contributing to the brain drain of talented young researchers who think their chances of getting a professorship at a reasonable age to be better abroad and hence move, for example, to the UK or the USA. Many feel overly dependent on their supervising principal investigators (the professor heading the research group) since superiors have power to delay the process of completing the habilitation. A further problem comes with funding support for those who wish to pursue a habilitation, where older candidates often feel discriminated against, for example under the DFG's Emmy-Noether programme. Furthermore, internal "soft" money might only be budgeted to pay for younger postdoctoral scientists. Because of the need to chase short-term research contracts, many researchers in the natural sciences apply for more transparent career development opportunities in other countries. In summary, a peer-reviewed demonstration of a successful academic development and an international outlook is considered more than compensation for an habilitation where there is evidence of grant applications, well-cited publications, a network of collaborators, lecturing and organisational experience, and experience of having worked and published abroad.

On the other hand, amongst many senior researchers, especially in medicine, the humanities and the social sciences, the habilitation was—and still is—regarded as a valuable instrument of quality control before giving somebody a tenured position for life.

Bavaria, Saxony and Thuringia, three states with conservative governments, filed suit at the German Constitutional Court against the new law replacing the habilitation with the junior professor. The Court concurred with their argument that the Bundestag (the federal parliament) cannot pass such a law, because the German constitution explicitly states that affairs of education are the sole responsibility of the states and declared the law to be invalid in June 2004. In reaction, a new federal law was passed, giving the states more freedom regarding habilitations and junior professors. The junior professor has since been legally established in all states, but it is still possible—and encouraged—for an academic career in many subjects in Germany to pursue a habilitation.

=== Italy ===
In the Italian legal system, habilitations are different types of acts and authorizations.

==== Habilitations for associate and full professorships in universities ====
Regarding university habilitations, the so-called Gelmini reform of the research and university teaching system (Italian Law 240 of year 2010 and subsequent modifications) has established the national scientific habilitation for the calls in the role of associate professor and full professor (called abilitazione scientifica nazionale, or ASN). This means that, as a prerequisite for being able to be selected by a university committee to fill these roles, it is necessary to have obtained the scientific qualification for the relative kind of teaching. For STEM fields (so called "bibliometric fields"), the qualifications requires a two-step evaluation:

1. first a quantitative assessment, as each candidate for and ASN as associate or full professor must have at least two out of these three requirements: having published more papers than most associate (or full) professors in Italian universities in the same field in the last 5 years (or 10 years), having received more citations than most associate (or full) professors in Italian universities in the last 10 years (or 15 years), having an h-index higher than most associate (or full) professors in Italian universities compited on the last 10 years (or 15 years);
2. then, a specific committee (one for each scientific sub-field) will qualitatively evaluate the scientific CV of the candidates, considering funding, mobility, autonomy of the research, awards won, teaching in foreign institutions (not in Italy) and so on.

The successful candidate will then receive their ASN habilitation as associate or full professor (or, in some instances, for both) and may thus apply for those vacancies in Italian universities.

With time the quantitative assessment requirements changed, basically fixing at the 2016 year the specific values the number of publications, citations and h-index to be achieved.

The ASN habilitation also allows to compete for three-year tenure-track assistant professorship positions (which were once called RTDb in the Italian system, for ricercatore a tempo determinato di tipo b, and now are labeled as RTT, "ricercatore in tenure-track"). At the end of the three-year contract the assistant professor must have a valid ASN habilitation in order to become a permanent associate professor; otherwise, he or she is permanently laid off. To prevent this (which may be disastrous to already undermanned Italian departments), it is common practice to award RTDb positions to people already habilitated as associate or full professors, which is in practical contrast with the spirit of the Gelmini-reform.

If an ASN habilitation application fails, the candidate can apply again, but only after a 12-month hiatus.

The ASN habilitation was initially valid for four years only, but this validity term was extended many times. It was first extended to six years, then 9 years, then 11 years (2023). Currently (2025), due to extreme scarcity of tenure track positions in Italy, the ASN habilitation validity has been increased to 12 years by yet another government decree in order not to let the first awarded habilitations expire (with consequent protests and possible lawsuits).

The ongoing Bernini Reform is slowly phasing out the ASN habilitation system, giving back power to the local universities to perform the quantitative assessment.

==== Professional qualifications ====
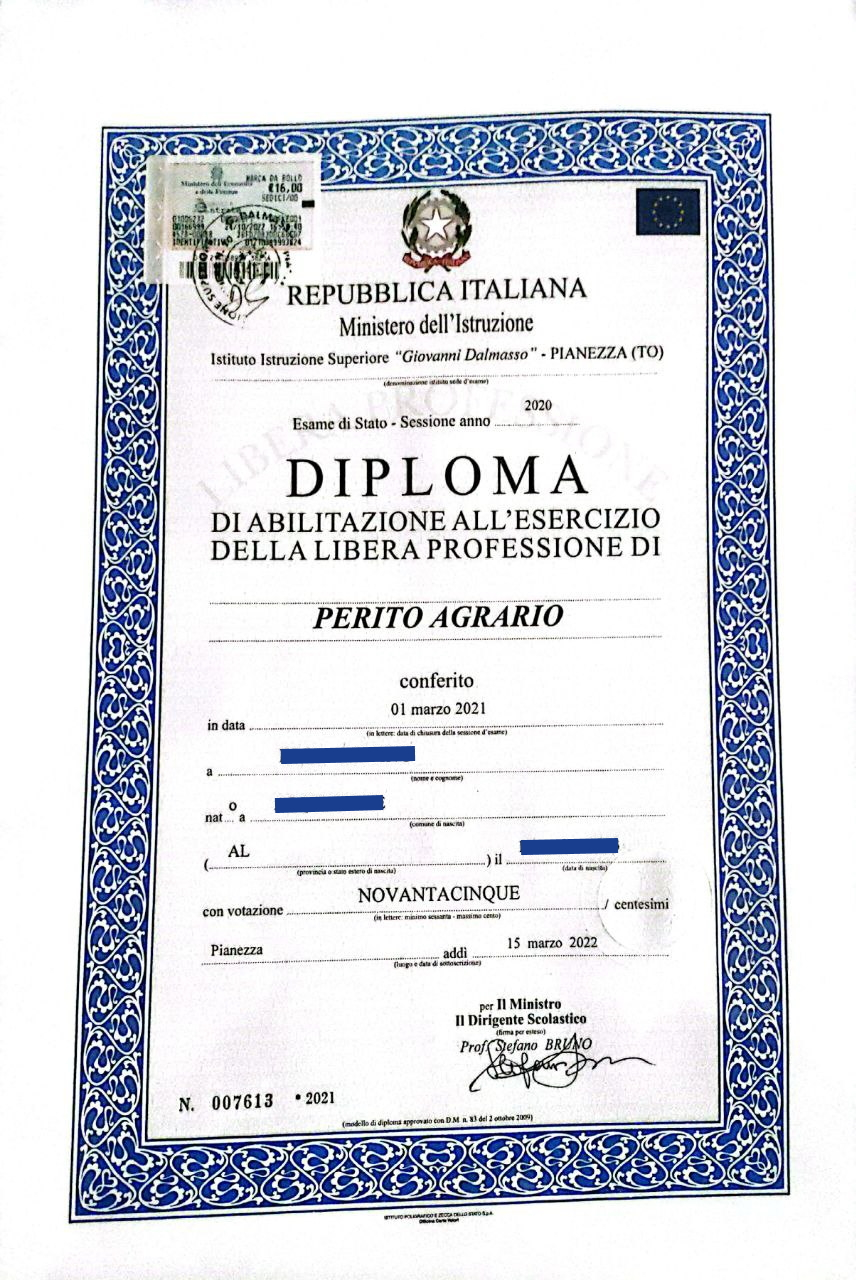
Example of Italian professional qualification: Diploma in Agriculture

In the field of free regulated professions, protected by a professional body (architects, lawyers, engineers, doctors, pharmacists, journalists, etc.), it identifies the state examination, more properly called "state examination for the qualification for the exercise of professions" that allows already graduated students or those with the necessary titles to register on the list of professionals and work. Many state exams include the possession of a specific qualification among the requirements. For example, to take the habilitation exam for to become an architect or an engineer, one must have already graduated from a university. However, in order to actually practice the profession it is necessary to register with the relevant professional association and, if the profession is exercised independently, it is necessary to have a VAT number. These exams are usually organized by the professional orders with the collaboration of area universities.

In other cases, especially in the case of health professions or childcare professionals, not protected by a professional nature, the degree itself is a qualifying title.

Finally, some habilitations, since their activities cannot be done autonomously, need to be hired in a suitable structure in order to effectively carry out the profession in question. This is for example the case of the education sector: once the qualifying examination has been passed, a public competition must be won for recruitment in an upper or lower secondary school.

=== Portugal ===
In the Portuguese legal system, there are two types of habilitation degree. The first is normally given to university professors and is named agregação or Decree of Law 239/2007 while the second is named habilitação (Decree of Law 124/99) and is used by doctoral researchers working in institutes outside universities. Legally, they are equivalent and are required for a professor (agregação) or a researcher (habilitação) to reach the top of their specific careers (full professor or coordinator researcher). Both degrees aim to evaluate if the candidate has achieved significant outputs in terms of scientific activity, including activities in postgraduation supervision.

The process to obtain any of the degrees is very similar, with minor changes. Any PhD holder can submit a habilitation thesis to obtain the degree. For agregação, the thesis is composed by a detailed CV of the achievements obtained after concluding the PhD, a detailed report of an academic course taught at the university (or a proposed course to be taught), and the summary of a lesson to be given. For habilitação, the academic course report is replaced by a research proposal or a proposal for advanced PhD studies.

After the candidate submits the habilitation thesis, a jury composed of five to nine full professors or coordinator researchers first evaluates the submitted documents; the majority needs to approve the candidate's request. If approved, the candidate then needs to defend their thesis in a one-day public defense. The public defense lasts for two hours each half day. In the morning, the curriculum of the candidate is discussed (for both degrees) and in the case of agregação, the candidate also needs to present and discuss an academic course. In the afternoon, the candidate needs to present and discuss a lecture (agregação) or a proposal of a research project (habilitação).

== Other usage ==
=== Current ===
Besides the examples described above, habilitation qualifications also exist in:

- Algeria (Habilitation à diriger des recherches, "accreditation to supervise research", abbreviated HDR)
- Belgium (French-speaking part: Agrégation de l'enseignement supérieur}, until 2010)
- Bulgaria (Доцент, Docent)
- Czech Republic (doc., docent)
- Denmark (dr. med./scient./phil.)
- Egypt (العالمية Ālimiyya/Al-Azhar)
- Finland (Dosentti/Docent)
- Hungary (Dr. habil.)
- Luxembourg (autorisation à diriger des recherches, "authorization to supervise research", or ADR)
- Moldova
- Poland (dr hab., doktor habilitowany)
- Romania (abilitare)
- Serbia (Доцент, Docent)
- Slovakia (Docent)
- Slovenia (Docent)
- Spain (Accreditation of research – Agregado)
- Sweden (Docent)
- Switzerland (PD and/or Dr. habil.)
- Tunisia (Habilitation à diriger des recherches, "accreditation to supervise research", abbreviated HDR)

=== Former ===
- Armenia, Azerbaijan (Habil. dr.; no longer conferred)
- Georgia (მეცნიერებათა დოქტორი/Doctor of Sciences, not awarded since 2005 reforms, currently highest degree is PhD. In some universities, such as Tbilisi State University, PhD-degree holders are called აკადემიური დოქტორი/Academic Doctor and those, who had degree მეცნიერებათა დოქტორი, are referred as Doctor of Science)
- Greece (υφηγεσία, υφηγητής), abolished in 1983
- Latvia (Dr. habil.), since 1995 no longer conferred
- Lithuania (Dr. habil.), since 2003 no longer conferred

== Equivalent degrees ==
The Doctor of Sciences — not to be confused with the Doctor of Science (D.Sc.) — is a terminal degree ranked above a Doctor of Philosophy, being used by a number of the former constituent republics of the Soviet Union, including Belarus (Доктар навук, Łacinka: Doktar navuk) Russia, Kyrgyzstan, Kazakhstan, Uzbekistan, and Ukraine (Доктор наук, Doktor nauk). Despite this ubiquity, doctorates from these countries — except Russia — are often not recognized by any German federal state as being equivalent to the habilitation. In 1999, Russia and Germany signed a Statement on Mutual Academic Recognition of Russian Academic Degrees and German Academic Qualifications, which prescribed an acceptance of equivalency between the Russian Doctor of Science and the German Habilitation qualification.

The cumulative form of the habilitation can be compared to the higher doctorates, such as the aformentioned D.Sc. (Doctor of Science), Litt.D. (Doctor of Letters), LL.D. (Doctor of Laws) and D.D. (Doctor of Divinity) found in the UK, Ireland, and some Commonwealth countries, being awarded on the basis of having a rich career of published work.

Furthermore, the position or title of an associate professor (or higher) at a European Union–based university is systematically translated into or compared to titles such as Universitätsprofessor (W2) (Germany), førsteamanuensis (Norway), or Doktor hab. (Poland) by institutions such as the European Commission's Directorate-General for Research, and therefore usually implies that the holder of such a title has a degree equivalent to habilitation.

== See also ==
- Habilitation to Supervise Research
- Postdoctoral research
