= Kochań =

- Village
- Location within Poland
- Coordinates: 52°27′48″N 14°53′55″E
- Country: Poland
- Voivodeship: Lubusz
- County: Słubice
- Gmina: Ośno Lubuskie
- Population: 20

Kochań [ˈkɔxaɲ] is a village in the administrative district of Gmina Ośno Lubuskie, within Słubice County, Lubusz Voivodeship, in western Poland.
