= Lionel Kochan =

British historian

- Born: 20 August 1922
- Died: 25 September 2005 (aged 83)
- Spouse: Miriam Kochan

Academic background
- Doctoral advisor: Sir Charles Webster

Academic work
- Discipline: Historian
- Sub-discipline: European history; Jewish history; 20th century; Russian Revolution
- Institutions: University of Edinburgh; University of East Anglia; University of Warwick

Lionel Edmond Kochan (20 August 1922 – 25 September 2005) was a British historian, journalist and publisher. He is best known for his work in Jewish history, having become an academic historian in his 30s and formerly specialising in European history.

== Early life and education ==
Kochan was educated at Haberdasher Aske School, an all-boys independent school in London. Having been awarded an open scholarship, he studied modern languages at Corpus Christi College, Cambridge, and graduated with a Bachelor of Arts (BA) degree in 1942.

== Career ==
After graduation, he served in the Intelligence Corps, British Army during the latter half of the Second World War. He was posted to Germany and Belgium. It "is thought to have used his ability in languages to translate intercepted messages and for work relating to interrogations".

After the war, he worked as a publisher and journalist. He wrote for The Jewish Observer and the Middle East Review. He also returned to university studies and was a doctoral student of Sir Charles Webster at the London School of Economics. He completed his Doctor of Philosophy (PhD) degree in European history in 1951 with a doctoral thesis titled "German-Russian relations, 1921–1936".

His first academic post was as a lecturer in European history at the University of Edinburgh from 1959 to 1964. He then moved to the University of East Anglia, where he was Reader in European History from 1965 to 1969. He was then the Bearsted Reader in Jewish History at University of Warwick from 1969; this academic appointment had been funded by Lord Bearsted as a lectureship but was upgraded to a readership to secure Kochan. He retired in 1987.

His scholarly writing became increasingly concerned with Jewish history. However, he rallied against focusing Jewish history on the Holocaust, against a rich history of more than 3000 years. He also opposed the institution of a Holocaust memorial day, a Holocaust museum in Britain and Holocaust studies at universities.

== Personal life ==
In 1951, Kochan married Miriam Buechler, a fellow Jewish journalist. She later worked as a writer and translator. Together they had three children; two sons and a daughter.

Kochan was raised as a secular Jew within an assimilated family in London. In adulthood, around the birth of his first child, he became more religious and attended the Jericho Street synagogue in Oxford. His wife popularised the ceremony of batmitzvah for girls aged 12 in Oxford.

== Selected works ==
- Acton on History (1954)
- Russia and the Weimar Republic (1954)
- Pogrom: 10 November 1938 (1957)
- The Making of Modern Russia (1962)
- The Struggle for Germany 1914–45 (1963)
- Russia in Revolution 1890–1918 (1966)
- The Jews in Soviet Russia since 1917 (1970) editor
- The Russian Revolution (1970)
- The Jewish Family Album: The Life of a People in Photographs (1974) editor with Miriam Kochan
- The Jew and His History (1977)
- The Scapegoats: the Exodus of the Remnants of Polish Jewry (1979) with Josef Banas
- Jews, Idols and Messiahs: The Challenge from History (1990)
- The Jewish Renaissance and Some of Its Discontents (1992)
- Beyond the Graven Image: A Jewish View (1997)
- The making of modern Russia: from Kiev Rus' to the collapse of the Soviet Union 3rd edition (1997) with John L. H. Keep
- The Making of Western Jewry, 1600–1819 (2004)
