= Sienno, Lubusz Voivodeship =

Sienno
- Village
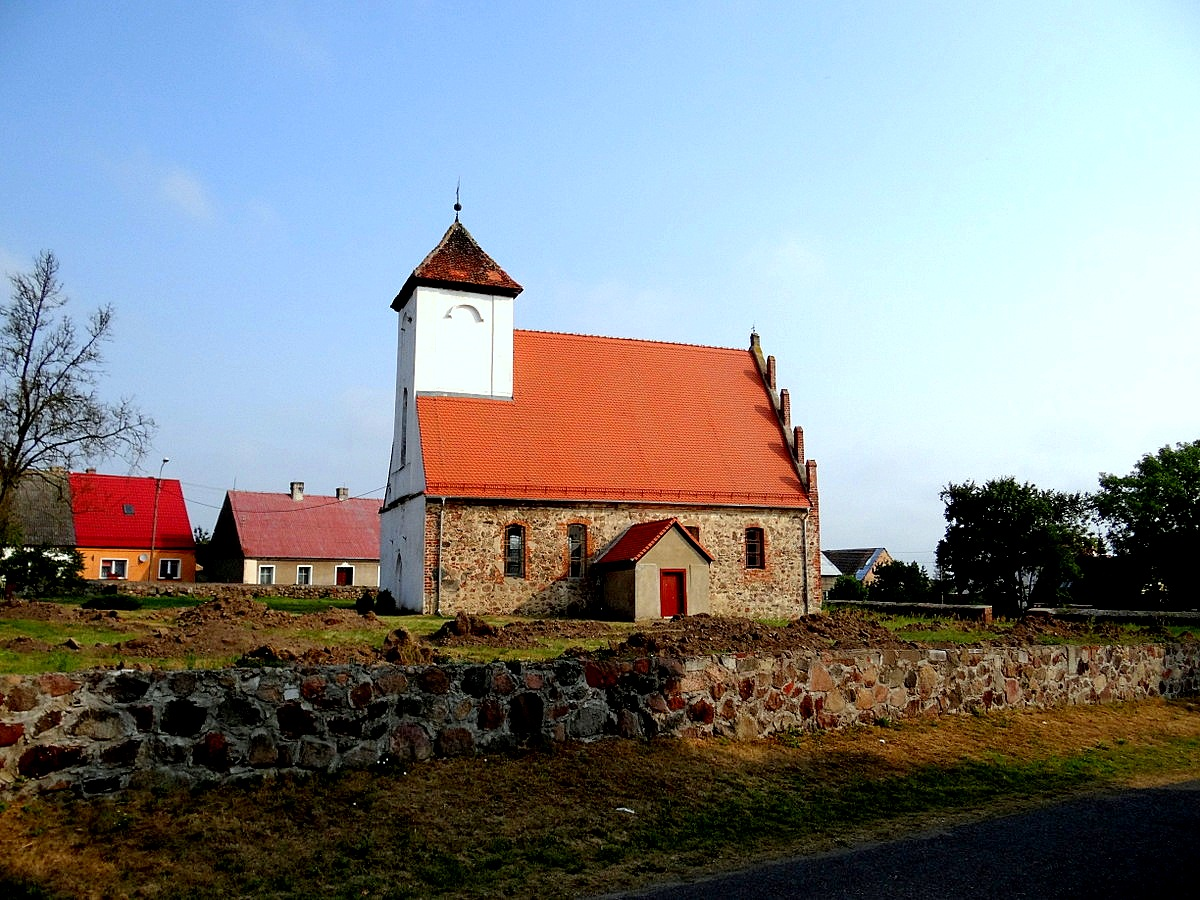
- Catholic church

- Location within Poland
- Coordinates: 52°27′57″N 14°46′52″E
- Country: Poland
- Voivodeship: Lubusz
- County: Słubice
- Gmina: Ośno Lubuskie
- Population: 200

Sienno [ˈɕɛnnɔ] is a village in the administrative district of Gmina Ośno Lubuskie, within Słubice County, Lubusz Voivodeship, in western Poland.
