= Lipienica, Lubusz Voivodeship =

Lipienica
- Village
- Location within Poland
- Coordinates: 52°29′55″N 14°52′6″E
- Country: Poland
- Voivodeship: Lubusz
- County: Słubice
- Gmina: Ośno Lubuskie
- Population: 80

Lipienica [lipjɛˈnit͡sa] is a village in the administrative district of Gmina Ośno Lubuskie, within Słubice County, Lubusz Voivodeship, in western Poland.
