= Esther Benbassa =

French historian and politician

- אסתר בןבאסה
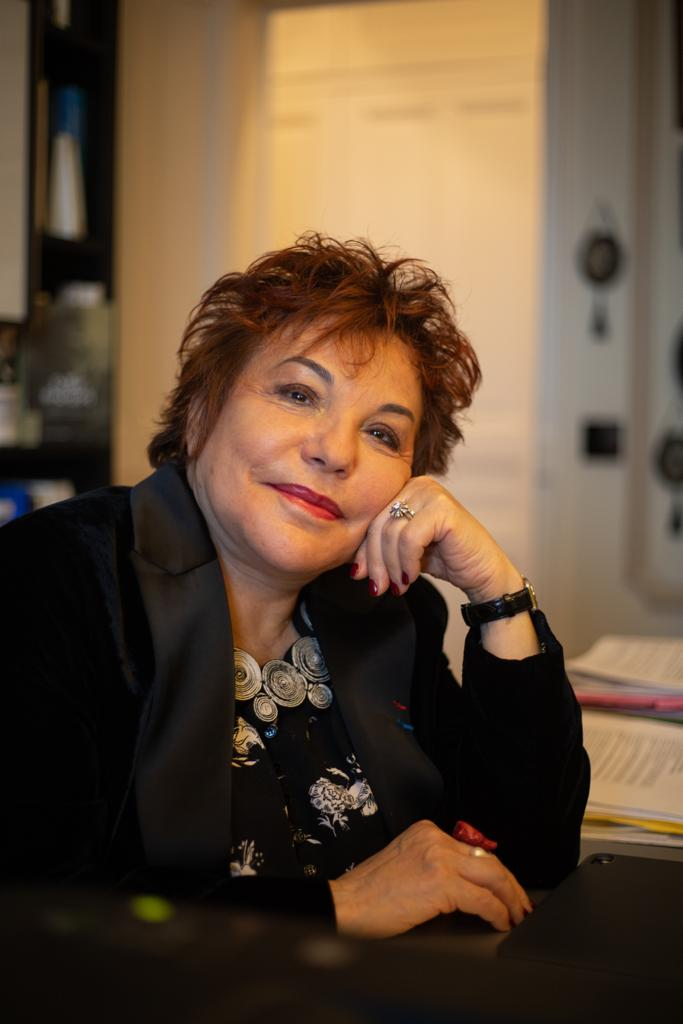
- Benbassa in 2020

Member of the Senate
- In office 1 October 2017 – 1 October 2023
- Constituency: Paris
- In office 1 October 2011 – 30 September 2017
- Constituency: Val-de-Marne

Personal details
- Born: Esther Benbassa; 27 March 1950 (age 76) Istanbul, Turkey
- Citizenship: Turkey • Israel • France
- Party: Independent (2021–present)
- Other political affiliations: Europe Ecology - The Greens (until 2021)
- Spouse: Jean-Christophe Attias
- Education: Tel Aviv University (B.A); University Paris-VIII (PhD); University Paris-III (PhD); INALCO
- Occupation: Historian • Politician

Esther Benbassa-Dudonney (Hebrew: אסתר בןבאסה-דודוני; born 27 March 1950) is a Turkish-Israeli-French historian and politician. She specializes in the history of Jews and other minorities. Between 2011 and 2023, Benbassa served as a French senator, representing Paris (2017–2023) and Val-de-Marne (2011–2017).

Benbassa is an independent. She was previously a member of Europe Ecology – The Greens, but was expelled from its parliamentary group in September 2021 following allegations of psychological workplace bullying by her former parliamentary assistants. This prompted her to leave the party altogether shortly after.

== Early life and education ==
Esther Benbassa was born on 27 March 1950 in Istanbul, Turkey. She is the descendant of a family of Jews expelled from Spain in 1492, emigrating to the Ottoman Empire. After attending primary school at the Isik School and the Sainte-Pulcherie lycée in Istanbul, Benbassa and her family emigrated to Israel when she was 15. There, she studied at the French-language Saint-Joseph school in Jaffa and received a baccalauréat from the French embassy.

Benbassa graduated from Tel Aviv University with a Bachelor of Arts in 1972, supporting her education by working in the tourism industry. She moved to France with a scholarship later that year and obtained a master's degree in modern literature from Paris 8 University Vincennes-Saint-Denis in 1973. In 1974, Benbassa became a French citizen by marriage, making her a triple citizen of France, Israel and Turkey. She received her Certificate of Aptitude for Secondary School Teachers (CAPES) in 1975 and taught in a lycée from 1975 to 1988. This qualification was followed by a diploma in Turkish from the National Institute of Oriental Languages and Civilizations (INALCO) in 1982 and a doctorate in literature and the human and social sciences from Paris 8 in 1987. Benbassa achieved the latter by completing a dissertation titled "Haim Nahum Efendi, Last Great Rabbi of the Ottoman Empire (1908–1920)" with Louis Bazin as her doctoral adviser. She had previously drafted a dissertation about the Paris Commune.

Benbassa conducted her postdoctoral studies in the department of Jewish history at the Hebrew University of Jerusalem from 1988 to 1989.

== Academic career ==
=== Jewish history research ===
Benbassa served as director of research at the French National Centre for Scientific Research (CNRS) from 1989 to 2000, in which year she became the director of studies in religious studies at the Practical School of High Studies (EPHE).

Benbassa studied the relationship between Jews and the State of Israel in her books Imaginary Israel (1998) and Do the Jews have a Future (2001), writing that Israel is the realization of the fundamentally secular project known as Zionism and thus, "forbidding oneself, in the name of an imaginary solidarity, from criticizing the policies of the [Israeli] government is to do a disservice to Israel." She additionally founded the Alberto Beneviste Centre for Sephardi and Socio-cultural Studies in 2002. Benbassa was also a researcher at the Roland Mousnier Centre, a joint venture of the CNRS, EPHE and Sorbonne University.

=== Promotion of Islamic-Jewish dialogue ===
Along with her husband Jean-Christophe Attias, Benbassa is the co-founder of Le Pari(s) du Vivre-Ensemble, an organization opposing discrimination and promoting diversity. She supports Islamic-Jewish dialogue, writing an essay titled "The Republic Facing its Minorities. The Jews Yesterday, the Muslims Today" during widespread political debate surrounding the Law on Religious Symbols in French Public Schools in 2004. Benbassa participated in a conference where she, according to journalist Caroline Fourest, criticized the law by "explaining to the Muslims that had come see Tariq Ramadan next to her that France was treating it as it had treated the Jews in the past." She published an anthology titled Jews and Muslims: A Shared History, A Dialogue to Construct in 2006.

Following the Charlie Hebdo shooting and Hypercacher kosher supermarket siege in January 2015, Benbassa organized a day of debate on the topic in March of that year. In October, she released a new anthology named Jews and Muslims: Let's Renew Our Links.

== Political career ==
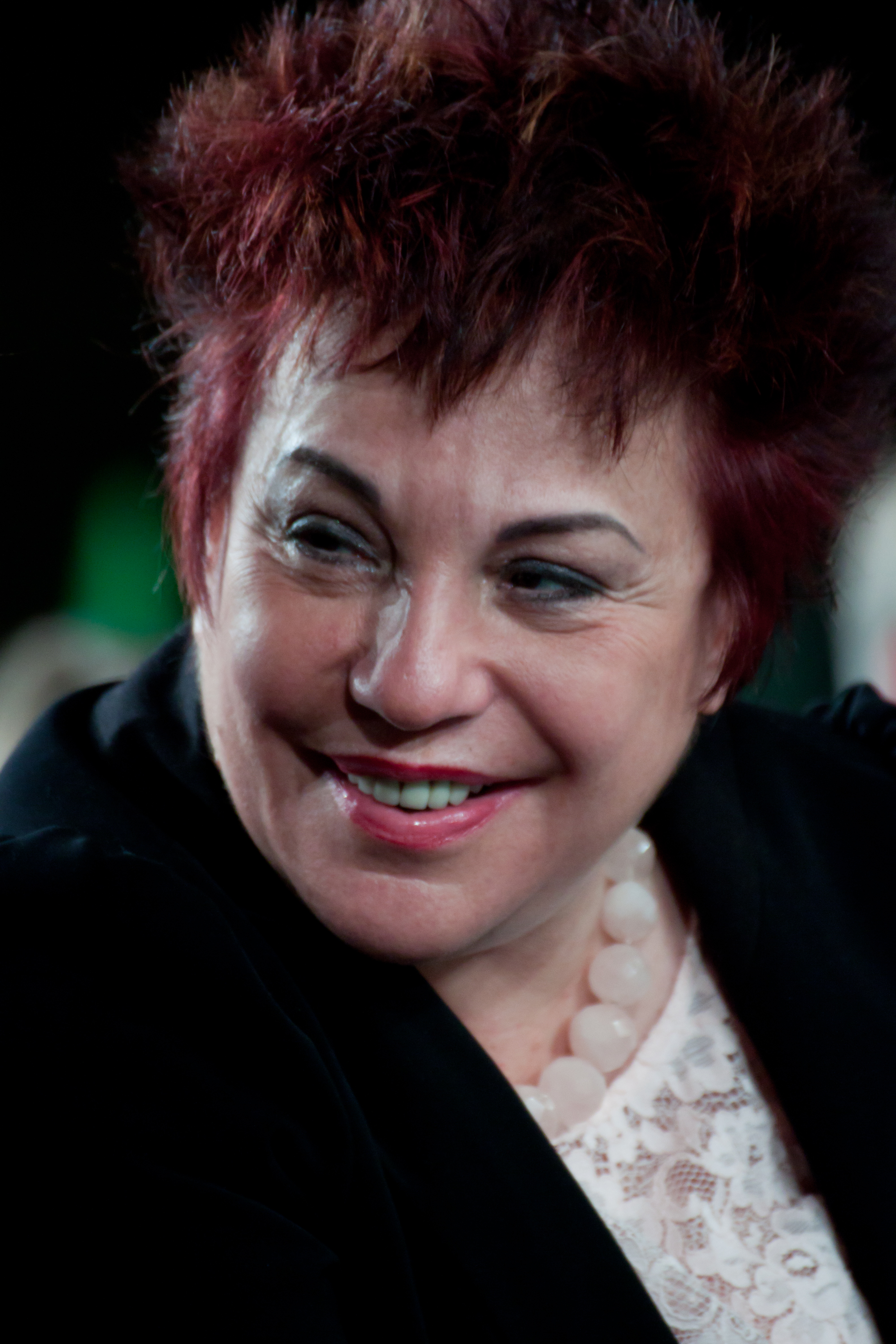
Benbassa during a public meeting hosted by then-Member of the European Parliament Eva Joly, 2012

=== Senator from Val-de-Marne and Paris ===
Benbassa was elected to represent Val-de-Marne in the Senate on 25 September 2011 as a member of Europe Ecology – The Greens (EELV). As a senator, she was the vice-president of the commission on constitutional law, legislation, universal suffrage, regulations and general administration; member of the strategic committee of the Civil Service Agency; vice-president of the Franco-Turkish friendship group; secretary of the Franco-Israeli friendship group; member of the Franco-Palestinian friendship group; member of the Inter-Parliamentary Union and member of the jury of the Senate Thesis Prize.

In 2012, Benbassa began to advocate for the right of French expatriates to vote in French elections.

Benbassa was the rapporteur for a bill extending the statute of limitations for discriminatory remarks of a homophobic, sexist or ableist character and thereby align it with laws surrounding racial, ethnic or religious discrimination. The bill was unanimously passed into law by the Senate on 30 January 2013. On 28 March 2013, the Senate also passed a law aiming to end public solicitation of sex workers, which Benbassa had introduced in the autumn of 2012.

At Benbassa's urging, the Senate laws committee created a fact-finding mission on racial, ethnic and religious discrimination in the autumn of 2012. She served alongside Jean-René Lecerf of the Union for a Popular Movement (UMP) as the mission's co-rapporteur. Their final report, presented in November 2014, was titled "The Fight Against Discrimination: From Incantation to Action." It included twelve proposals, among them the introduction of a census question on the birth country of one's ancestors and respondents' previous nationalities "in order to obtain measurable findings on the extent of discrimination and its occurrences." Malika Sorel, former member of the High Council for Integration, criticized the proposals as "dangerous" and conducive to the "exacerbation of tensions in our nation."

In October 2013, in response to the Dibrani case involving the arrest of an illegal immigrant child during a field trip and their immediate deportation, Benbassa commented: "I, who thought France had not forgotten its sombre history, was far from imagining that in 2013, as an official elected by the people, would be the witness to a police roundup. Because yes, it must be made clear that this was a roundup." Benbassa's comments were criticized by philosopher Alain Finkielkraut, who argued that "the constant reference to the Shoah—and I choose my words carefully here—is ignoble." Journalist Benoît Rayski argued that her statement summarized "all the most common talking points of supposedly anti-racist indignation."

In February 2014, Benbassa was named vice-president of a Senate special committee examining a bill that would empower efforts to end sex work. It was in this position that she repeatedly expressed her opposition to the proposed punishment of the clients of sex workers.

Benbassa authored the first ever French bill for the legalization of cannabis and introduced it in the Senate in January 2014. The legislation was debated until April 2015, when it was rejected. In response, Benbassa organized a Senate conference in October 2016 with the National Conservatory of Arts and Crafts's chair of addiction studies, titled "Legalization of Cannabis: Is Europe Condemned to an Impasse?"

Benbassa joined several other senators in introducing a resolution urging other branches of the French government to recognize the State of Palestine, passing in December 2014. She also drafted a resolution for the protection of environmental migrants, which the Senate passed in October 2015.

In March 2016, Benbassa led the laws committee in establishing a fact-finding mission on deradicalization, for which she served as co-rapporteur along with Catherine Troendlé of The Republicans (LR). They then published a report on the topic.

In April 2016, Benbassa again sparked controversy after writing an editorial in Libération titled "The veil is not more alienating than the miniskirt".

During the 2017 French Senate elections, Benbassa headed the EELV list in Paris and was elected for a second term on 24 September 2017. On 3 October, she joined the Communist, Republican, Citizen and Environmentalist group. Since then, Benbasssa has sat on the constitutional law, legislation, universal suffrage, regulations and general administration committee and has served as the vice-president of the senatorial delegation to Overseas France.

During her second term, Benbassa has spoken on various issues: she joined the yellow vest protesters; advocated for migrants; denounced living conditions in French prisons, particularly for minors; lobbied against gender-based and sexual violence, especially in the political world and planned to introduce legislation on animal welfare.

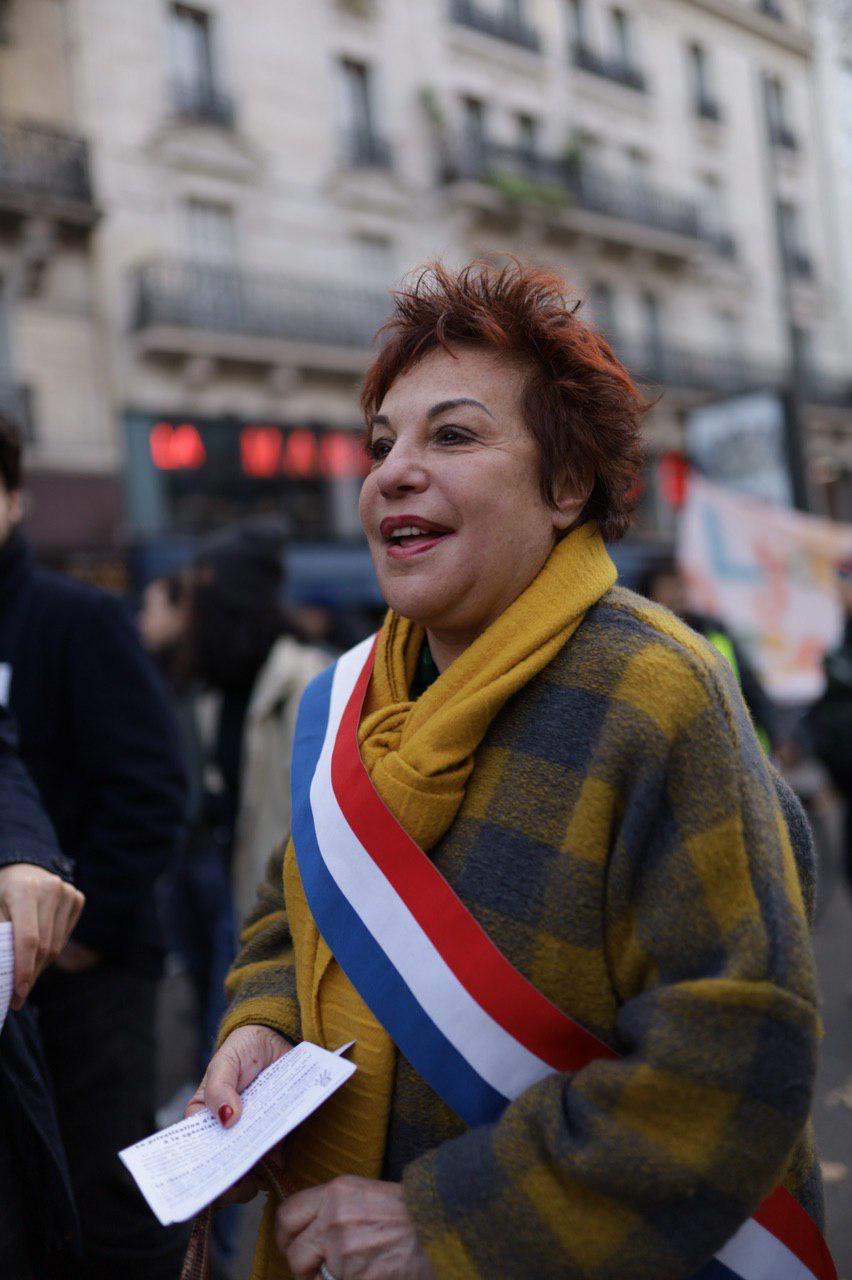
Benbassa in a protest, 2019

In November 2019, Benbassa took part in a protest against Islamophobia organized by several parties and civil society organizations. Controversy arose once more after she published a photograph of herself at the demonstrations accompanied by participants (among them a young girl) wearing a yellow, five-pointed star and a crescent moon of the same colour, all labelled with the English word "Muslim." This provoked a wave of allegations of diminishing the Holocaust's importance by comparing it to Islamophobia, noting the star's resemblance to the yellow badge. The magazine Marianne criticized Benbassa for taking advantage of a child for political purposes, arguing that "in Islamist processions, as in the protest, children are forced into the propaganda of adults and wear slogans that they cannot understand. This is a violation of the charter on the rights of the child." On 18 November, HuffPost published an editorial supporting Benbassa titled "Esther Benbassa Honours the Republic" and signed by over 150 political figures including academics, activists and left-wing political officials.

In October 2020, Benbassa became the secretary of the Senate and vice-president of the EELV group. She was expelled from the group on 15 September 2021 following allegations of workplace bullying and consequently became a member of the administrative group of senators not appearing on the list of any group (RASNAG).

During the 2022 French presidential election, Benbassa gave her sponsorship to Hélène Thouy.

=== Workplace bullying allegations ===
In July 2021, online newspaper Mediapart published an investigation detailing allegations of coercion and humiliation from Benbassa's parliamentary staff and former students. The accusations included the senator pressuring an assistant to delay a surgical operation by several months, repeatedly threatening her staff and harshly attacking their actions and competence. All accusers described an atmosphere of "terror" Benbassa had created among her subordinates. Mediapart also reported high turnover in her office, with over 18 parliamentary assistants having been employed over two terms.

Benbassa disputed the version of events published by the newspaper, but nonetheless acknowledged her "mood swings" and apologized to "those that [she had] hurt."

In September 2021, Benbassa was expelled from the Senate EELV group, with the latter explaining that "Mrs. Benbassa has not disputed some of the witnesses' accounts and has not, to this day, attempted to sue the accusers for defamation." The senator responded in a press release denouncing the "sham of internal procedures" that made a "farce of due process." She then left EELV that December.

== Personal life ==
Benbassa is married to Jean-Christophe Attias, who serves as the director of studies at the Practical School of High Studies and won the 2015 Goncourt Prize in Biography. Attias is also her occasional co-author.

Benbassa identifies as an atheist.

== Awards and honours ==
- Knight of the National Order of Merit, 2005
- Seligmann Prize Against Racism, Injustice and Intolerance, 2008
- Guizot Prize bronze medal by the French Academy for La Souffrance comme identité, 2011
- Senator of the Year for 2017 by Le Trombinoscope, 2018

== Works ==
In English

- Haim Nahum. A Sephardic Rabbi in Politics, 1892-1923, Tuscaloosa, The University of Alabama Press, 1995. ISBN 978-0-8173-0729-5
- A Sephardi Life in Southeastern Europe. The Autobiography and Journal of Gabriel Arié, 1863-1939, Seattle & London, University of Washington Press, 1998 (with Aron Rodrigue). ISBN 978-0-295-97674-7
- History of Sephardic Jewry, XIVth-XXth Centuries, Berkeley, University of California Press, 2000 (with A. Rodrigue).
- The Jews of France. A History from Antiquity to the Present, Princeton, Princeton University Press, 1999, 2nd ed. (softcover), 2001.
- Israël, the Impossible Land, Stanford, Stanford University Press, 2003 (with Jean-Christophe Attias).
- The Jews and their Future. A Conversation on Jewish Identities, London, Zed Books, 2004 (with J.-C. Attias).
- The Jew and the Other, Ithaca, Cornell University Press, 2004 (with J.-C. Attias).
- Suffering as Identity, London – New-York, Verso, 2010.

In French

- Un grand rabbin sépharade en politique, 1892-1923, Paris, Presses du CNRS, 1990.
- Une diaspora sépharade en transition (Istanbul, xix^{e} – xx^{e} siècles), Paris, Cerf, 1993.
- Histoire des Juifs de France, Paris, Seuil, coll. Points Histoire, 2nd revised edition, 2000.
- La République face à ses minorités. Les Juifs hier, les musulmans aujourd'hui, Paris, Mille et une nuits/Fayard, 2004.
- La Souffrance comme identité, Paris, Fayard, 2007. 2nd edition, Hachette, coll. Pluriel, 2010.
- Être juif après Gaza, Paris, CNRS Éditions, 2009.
- De l'impossibilité de devenir français. Nos nouvelles mythologies nationales, Paris, Les Liens qui Libèrent, 2012.
- Égarements d'une cosmopolite, Paris, Bourin Éditeur, 2012.
- Istanbul la Sépharade, Paris, CNRS éditions, 2015.
- Vendredi noir et nuits blanches, Paris, Lattès, 2016.

With Aron Rodrigue

- Une vie judéo-espagnole à l'Est : Gabriel Arié, Paris, Cerf, 1992.
- Histoire des Juifs sépharades. De Tolède à Salonique, Paris, Seuil, 2002.

With Jean-Christophe Attias

- Dictionnaire de civilisation juive, Paris, Larousse-Bordas, 1997. 2nd edition, 1998.
- Israël, la terre et le sacré, Paris, Flammarion, 1998. 2nd edition., 2001.
- Les Juifs ont-ils un avenir ?, 2nd edition., Paris, Hachette, 2002.
- Le Juif et l'Autre, Gordes, Le Relié, 2001.
- Petite Histoire du judaïsme, Paris, Librio, 2007.
- Dictionnaire des mondes juifs, Paris, Larousse, 2008.

Editor

- Mémoires juives d'Espagne et du Portugal, Paris, Publisud, 1996.
- Transmission et passages en monde juif, Paris, Publisud, 1997.
- La haine de soi. Difficiles identités, Bruxelles, Complexe, 2000 (with Jean-Christophe Attias).
- L'Europe et les Juifs, Genève, Labor et Fides, 2002 (with Pierre Gisel).
- Les Sépharades en littérature. Un parcours millénaire, Paris, Presses de l'Université Paris-Sorbonne, 2005.
- Itinéraires sépharades. Complexité et diversité des identités, Paris, Presses de l’Université Paris-Sorbonne, 2010.
- Dictionnaire des racismes, de l’exclusion et des discriminations, Paris, Larousse, 2010.
- Israël-Palestine. Les enjeux d’un conflit, Paris, CNRS Éditions, 2010.
- La France en situation postcoloniale ?, Mouvements (septembre 2011).
- Minorités visibles en politique, Paris, CNRS Éditions, 2011.
- Encyclopédie des religions, Paris, Fayard/Pluriel, 2012 (with Jean-Christophe Attias)
- Salonique, ville juive, ville ottomane, ville grecque, Paris, CNRS Éditions, 2014.
- Dans les quartiers, l’égalité c’est maintenant ! Livre blanc, Paris, Le Pari(s) du Vivre-Ensemble, 2014 (with Jean-Christophe Attias).
- Juifs et musulmans. Retissons les liens!, Paris, CNRS Éditions, 2015 (with Jean-Christophe Attias).
- Les Sépharades. Histoire et culture du Moyen Âge à nos jours, Paris, CNRS Éditions, 2016.
- Nouvelles relégations territoriales, Paris, CNRS Éditions, 2017 (with Jean-Christophe Attias).
- Violences sexistes et sexuelles en politique, Paris, CNRS Éditions, 2018.
- Nous et les animaux, Paris, Les Petits Matins, 2020.
