= Aron Rodrigue =

Aron Rodrigue is the Daniel E. Koshland Professor in Jewish Culture and History at Stanford University.

== Education ==
- Ph.D., Harvard University, History
- A.M., Harvard University, History
- B.A., First Class Honours, University of Manchester, History

== Books ==
- A Jewish Voice from Ottoman Salonica: The Ladino Memoir of Sa'adi Besalel a-Levi co-authored with Sarah Abrevaya Stein and Isaac Jerusalmi (Stanford University Press, 2012)
- Sephardi Jewry: A History of the Judeo-Spanish Community, 14th-20th Centuries with Esther Benbassa, (University of California Press, 2000)

== Honors & Awards ==
- Fellowship, Memorial Foundation for Jewish Culture (1985-1987)
- Summer Faculty Fellowship, Indiana University (1987)
- Summer Faculty Fellowship, Indiana University (1988)
- Fellowship, American Council of Learned Societies (1988)
- Outstanding Young Faculty Award, Indiana University (1988)
- Fellow, Institute for Advanced Studies, The Hebrew University of Jerusalem (1988-1989)
- The Toledano Prize for Sephardic Studies, Misgav Yerushalayim Institute, Jerusalem (1989)
- Finalist for National Jewish Book Council Prize, National Jewish Book Council (1991)
- National Jewish Book Council Honor Award in Sephardic Studies, National Jewish Book Council (1994)
- Fellowship, Stanford Humanities Center (1998)
- Fellowship, American Council of Learned Societies (1998)
- Fellow, American Academy of Jewish Research (2002 - current)
- Ina Levine Senior Scholar in Residence, Center for Advanced Studies, US Holocaust Memorial Museum (2003-2004)
- Alberto Benveniste Prize for Research in Sephardic Studies, Centre Alberto-Benveniste, Ecole Pratique des Hautes Etudes, Paris (2011)
- Chevalier dans l'Ordre des Palmes Académiques, French Ministry of Education (2013)
- Chevalier de l'Ordre des Arts et Lettres, French Ministry of Culture (2013)
