= Habilitation to Supervise Research =

Type of diploma in France

In France, the Habilitation à diriger des Recherches (HDR, lit. Habilitation to Direct Research) is a diploma that "sanctions recognition of the candidate's high scientific level, the originality of his or her approach in a field of science, his or her ability to master a research strategy in a sufficiently broad scientific or technological field, and his or her capacity to supervise young researchers". It was created in 1984 by the Savary law, replacing the state doctorate.

The HDR is a prerequisite for university professorships. It is not mandatory in French academia in general, but it is required to apply for research Établissement public à caractère scientifique, culturel et professionnel [management positions in public scientific and technological establishments] (EPST). There are exceptions to this rule. A person appointed to the professorship is automatically qualified to direct research.

An HDR is a prerequisite for supervising a PhD thesis or acting as PhD thesis rapporteur (in the absence of the rank of university professor, study director or research director).

== History ==
The habilitation to direct research is a recent diploma in France, created in 1984 by the Savary law. It replaces the doctorat d'État [state doctorate], which itself lasted only twenty years (Decree no. 66-170 of March 22, 1966). It has few equivalents anywhere in the world, existing in only a few countries, most of them European (see the list in the University accreditation article).

== Rank ==
The HDR is the highest academic qualification in France, insofar as the agrégation du supérieur, in those disciplines where it still exists, is not a diploma but a competitive examination. The HDR diploma does not have a specific RNCP level.

The habilitation does not sanction the completion of a university course, and "is not and must not under any circumstances be considered as a second, higher-level doctorate, as the state doctorate was in the past in relation to the post-graduate doctorate". The HDR is taken in all disciplines, but is not essential in disciplines that recruit through the agrégation competitive examination, mainly law.

The HDR may explain why professors and researchers publish more about fifteen years after defending their thesis.

=== Length of time ===
The length of time it takes to prepare an HDR depends on the discipline and the doctoral school. Since candidates only enroll in the degree in the year they defend it, the duration is not standardized: a minimum of 1 year, but sometimes much more (over ten years), particularly in the humanities and social sciences.

=== CNU qualification after HDR ===
Until 2020, obtaining an HDR was not enough to apply for a professorship. It was also necessary to obtain qualification from the Conseil national des universités (CNU), following a specific application process (submission of a dossier very similar to that for the Habilitation itself, studied by a double expert panel once a year).

The 2020 research programming law changes the rule for an experimental 4-year period: not only is qualification automatic for tenured lecturers (Art. L. 952-6-4), but the Docents of each university may choose to waive the qualification rule for any position other than those accessible through the agrégation du supérieur competitive examination (Art. L. 952-6-3). The reform is strongly criticized.

== Application form ==
The decree of November 23, 1988 governing the HSR makes registration for the diploma conditional on possession of a doctorate, or a diploma of doctor of medicine, odontology, pharmacy or veterinary medicine, as well as a diploma of advanced studies or a research master's degree, or proof of a diploma or experience equivalent to a doctorate.

== See also ==
- Habilitation
