= Rzepin =

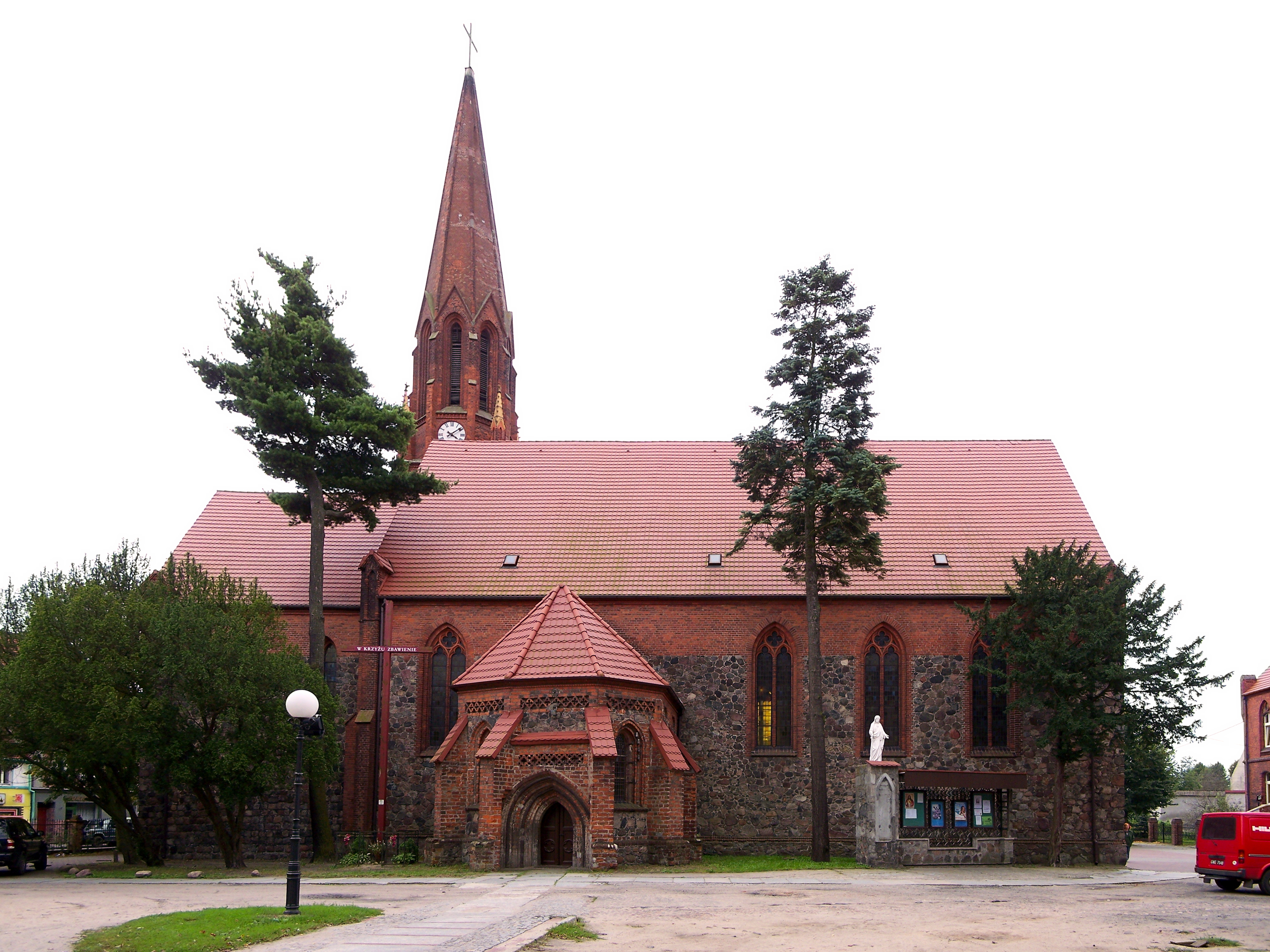
- Sacred Heart church in Rzepin

- Coat of arms

- Location within Poland
- Coordinates: 52°21′N 14°50′E
- Country: Poland
- Voivodeship: Lubusz
- County: Słubice
- Gmina: Rzepin

Government
  - Mayor: Sławomir Dudzis

Area
  - Total: 11.42 km^{2} (4.41 sq mi)
- Elevation: 50 m (160 ft)

Population (2019-06-30)
  - Total: 6,529
  - Density: 571.7/km^{2} (1,481/sq mi)
- Time zone: UTC+1 (CET)
  - Summer (DST): UTC+2 (CEST)
- Postal code: 69-110
- Car plates: FSL
- Website: http://www.rzepin.pl/

Rzepin [ˈʐɛpʲin] (German: Reppen) is a town in western Poland. Situated in the Lubusz Voivodeship (since 1999), in Słubice County it is the seat of Gmina Rzepin. As of 2019, the town had a population of 6,529 inhabitants.

== Geography ==
The town is situated in the western part of the Lubusz Lake District and Torzymska Plain (315.43), in the longitudinal postglacial valley, in the historical region of Lubusz Land.

=== Hydrology ===
The Ilanka river, which is the right-bank tributary of the Oder river, flows through the town and takes the tributary Rzepin to the south of the town, near Nowy Młyn. Among the Ilanka's hydrological curiosities is the phenomenon of bifurcation, occurring to the north of Rzepin, where the river separates its stream. As a result, some waters flow into the Łęczna river to the Warta drainage. Rzepin surroundings is rich in glacial lakes, among others: Busko, Długie – local bathing beach, Głębiniec, Linie, Lubińskie, Oczko, Papienko (Popienko) and Rzepsko.

=== Rzepin Forest ===
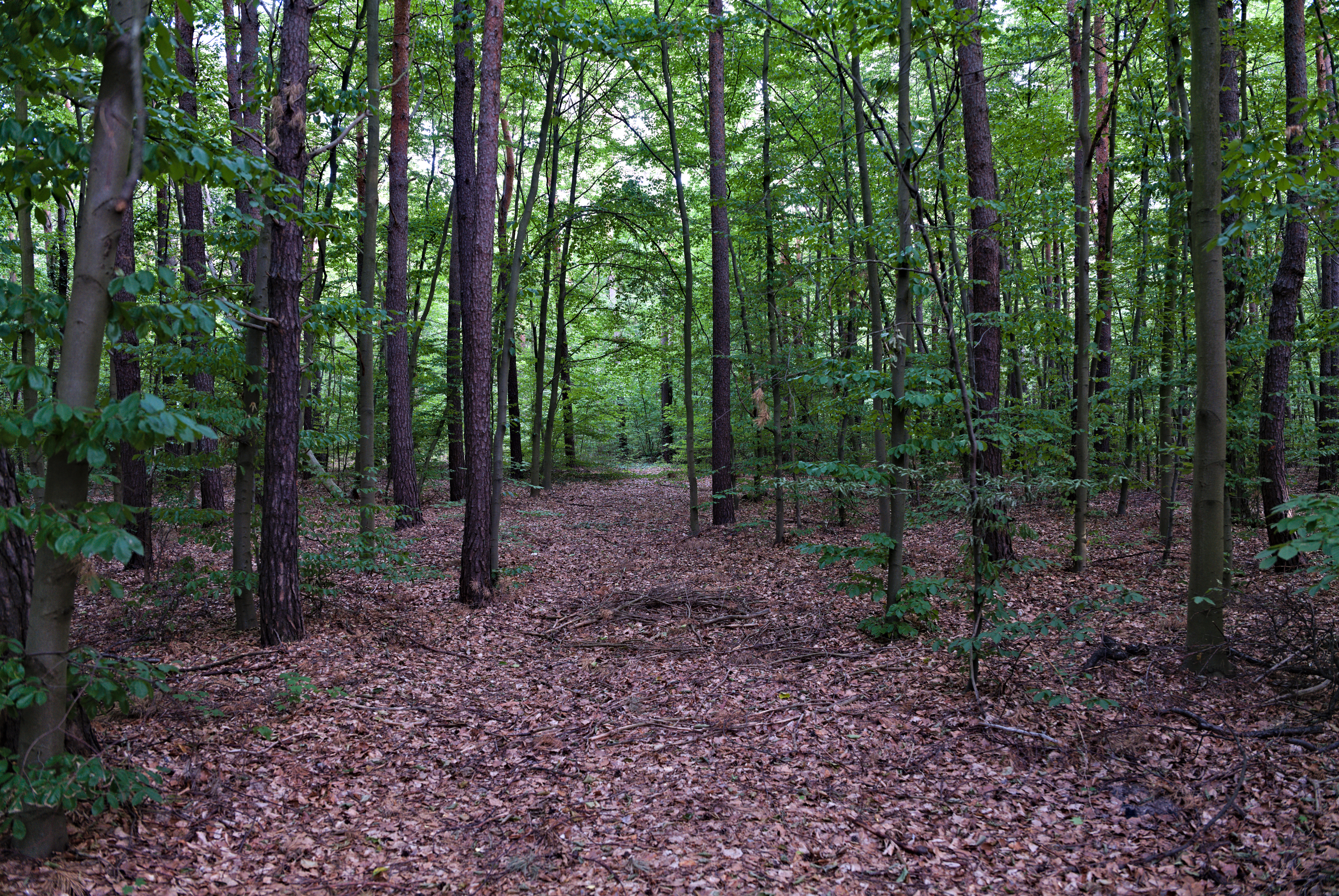
Forest in Rzepin

Rzepin was given ownership of the adjacent forests before 14th century, which was confiscated in 1553 because of the wrongly laid tax by the town authorities. The town maintained its rights only to a small part of the rickety woodland. High population of game animals in the region was confirmed by the presence of two royal forests in the vicinity of Rzepin. In the 18th century, a royal forest district was established under administration of the Oberforsthaus Reppen, which, under current name of Dąbrówka, also known as Osęka (currently a part of the Rzepinek settlement) is still being used as a forest lodge. Currently the term Rzepin Forest should only be treated in historical context, or to some extent, as an equivalent of the Lubusz Forest, which is a vast woodland situated mostly in the vicinity of Rzepin and Torzym in the Lubusz Voivodeship. The forest district administration is located in Rzepin.

== Etymology ==
The origin is, without any doubt, Slavic. In 1856 Berghaus investigated the town name origin of words: repina (a folk name of maple), rjepa (turnip), or rjepnik (field of turnip). According to Mucke, the name could originate from the word ryby (fish) – Rybin, Rybek, Rybno – fisherman's colony (town located by the riverside). Current Polish etymology (according to Rospond, Rymut and Malec) clearly indicates a nickname Rzepa (Polish name of turnip), or the name of turnip itself, as the town name origin.

After World War II, during a short period of time, the town was called Rypin Lubuski, whereas since the late 1940s the current form has been used. It also became the county town (Rzepin County with its seat in Słubice).

== History ==
The town was founded in the place of a 10th-century fort and a craftsmen settlement outside the fort, which was located near a convenient crossing of the Ilanka river. It was located in Lubusz Land, which was part of the provinces of Greater Poland and Silesia of the Medieval Kingdom of Poland. In the second half of the 13th century the land was handed over by archbishops of Magdeburg to Brandenburg margraves. Rzepin's history become turbulent ever since. The town was sold many times and its land was regularly confiscated.

The oldest record about Rzepin dates back to 1297 and it regards the presence of pleban de Repin (Repin's parson) Iacobus Craft at a ceremony of granting the village of Wystok to the Paradyż Abbey. In 14th and 15th century the town was defined with a ‘New’ suffix, which could signify its new location or new town charter: 28 July 1329 – Newen Reppin, 1335 – Nyen Rypin, 1441 – Nyen Reppen. The grad was possibly transferred into a more convenient place because the remains of an earlier grad upon the Ilanka river, between Tarnawa Rzepińska and Starościn, survived until our times. The names Reppin or Reppen appear in the German literature, while Rypin or Rzepin can be found in the Polish sources. In 1437 the name Stat Kleynen Reppin appeared once more, however an attempt to call the town ‘little’ was unsuccessful. Since the mid-15th century, its name was written without the adjective.

Medieval Rzepin was a town inhabited by craftsmen. There were guilds of clothiers, butchers, bakers and shoemakers. Its citizens were also earning their living as fishermen and brewers. A water mill was a part of the town landscape. Thanks to the citizens’ resourcefulness and valor the town was developing rapidly, however, it was hindered by plagues and other disasters, including numerous fires. One of them destroyed a historical town hall. Between 1373 and 1415 the town was part of the Lands of the Bohemian (Czech) Crown. From the 18th century the town was part of the Kingdom of Prussia, and from 1871 it was part of the German Empire.

New railway lines were built passing through the town, connecting Frankfurt (Oder) with Poznań (1869) and Szczecin with Głogów (1875), and a railway line connecting Rzepin with Ośno Lubuskie, Sulęcin and Międzyrzecz (1890). In 1881, a Richter Fund Hospital was built (the building in Słubicka Street doesn't exist any more). In 1904, the town became a county seat. In 1911–1913 new primary and secondary schools were built. In 1926 a new settlement land near the Drenziger Weg (now Słowacki Street) was founded and parcelled. In 1927 a new municipal beach and sports center were opened by Długie Lake. In 1929 a new post office was built.

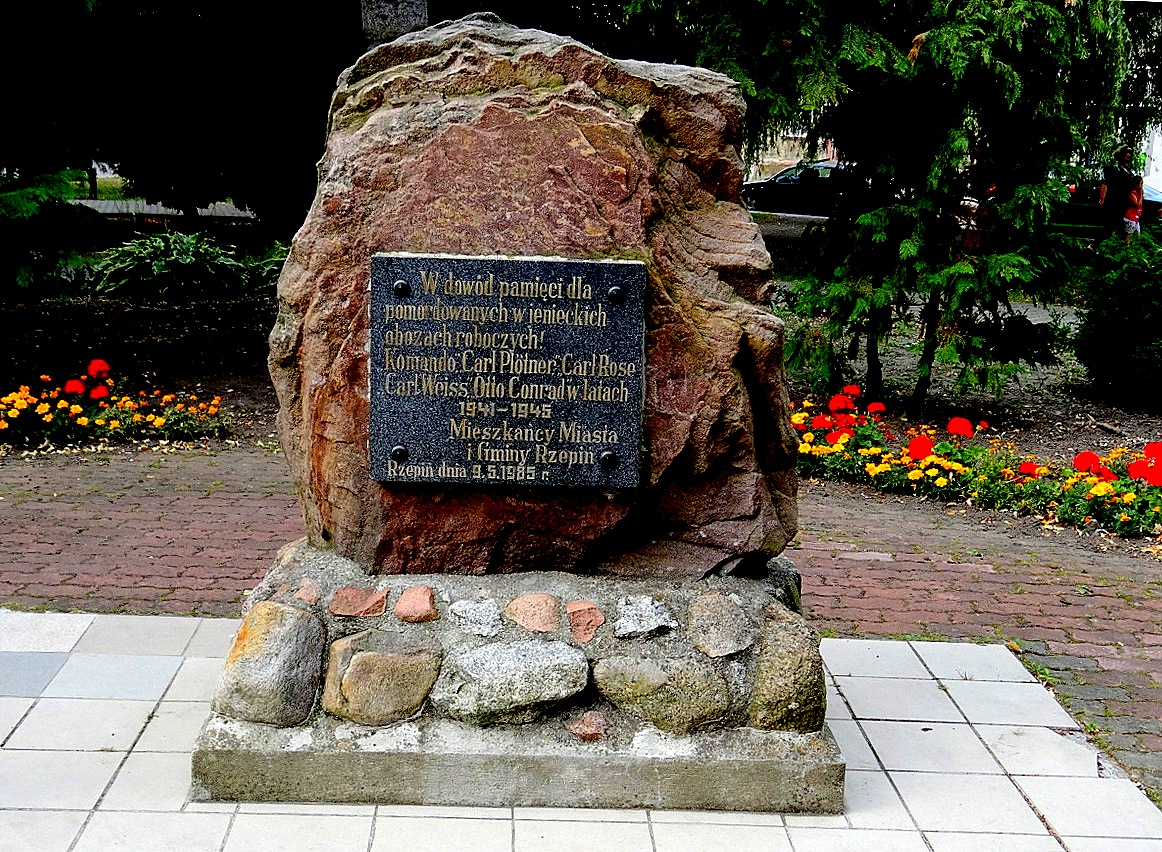
Memorial to the prisoners-of-war murdered in German forced labour camps during World War II

According to the census from 17 May 1939, the town was inhabited by 6.442 citizens, and its area consisted of 2610,6 hectares. During the final months of World War II, the town was captured by the Soviets and then it eventually became again part of Poland. Already in June 1945, the entire town populace was expelled for new Polish settlers to take their place.

From 1975 until 1998 the town administratively belonged to the Gorzów Voivodeship.

== Urban planning ==
The shape of the medieval Rzepin resembled a rectangle 300 x 400 m. The town layout revealed three parallel streets, that were crossing the town longitudinally and transversely, distinguishing the medieval marketplace. The oldest plan of Rzepin was compiled by Eichler in 1725. The Old Town, with high – density housing, is located on the right bank of the Ilanka, whereas from the remaining sides it was surrounded by a ditch (town moat), which was subsequently filled back in due to the negative influence of the humid microclimate. Now it serves as a park alley.

Town layout consists of 69 streets and 2 squares: the Kościelny (Church) Square and the Ratuszowy (Town Hall) Square.

== Sights ==
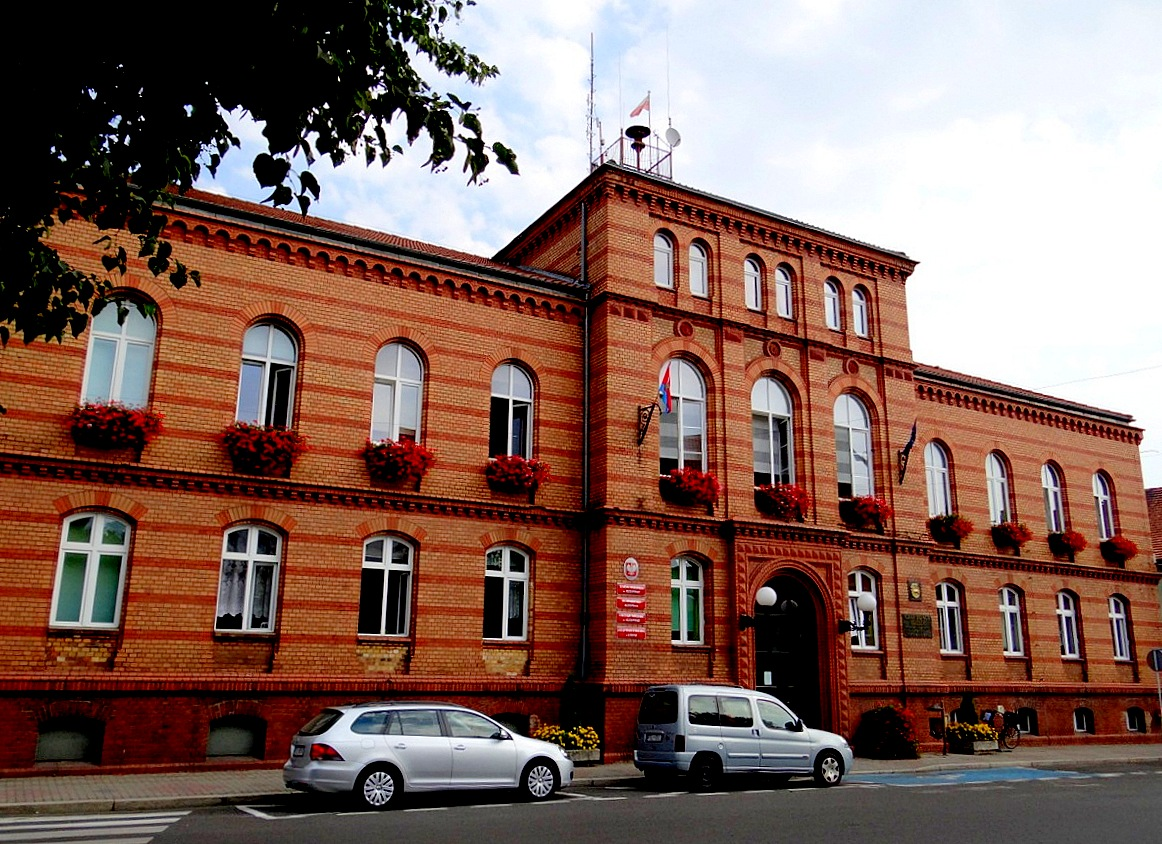
Town Hall in 2015

- Sacred Heart of Jesus Church – built around the mid-13th century in the late-Romanesque style, converted in the neo-Gothic style in 1878, which coincided with the addition of a belfry. Only stone walls of the south and the north elevations along with the chancel with three characteristic windows have remained from the previous sanctuary. A 15th-century Gothic brick chapel annex with an ogival portal and groin vault is adjacent to the church from the North.; The church has been in possession of 19-pipe organs since 1879. Currently the parochial church is situated in the town center on the Koscielny square;
- Hunting lodge – a classicistic building, erected in the 18th century; currently on the Słubicka Street;
- Town Hall (Ratusz) – a building erected in 1833, severely damaged during World War II, rebuilt between 1950 and 1960;
- Piast Oak – a natural monument, Quercus robur, circumference 613 cm (241 in), height 20 metres (66 feet). It is estimated to be around 600 years old, placed in the village of Liszki, around 3 km (2 mi) South from the town;
- Beaver's Path Nature Trail – situated at the Rzepia river's mouth to the Ilanka river, with its beginning at the forest's lodge in the settlement of Nowy Młyn;
- Water Mill – built in the beginning of the 19th century, currently powered by an electric turbine;

== Nature ==
- Natural monuments: ‘Oak Piast’ Pedunculate Oak (circumference 613 cm; estimated to be around 700 years old); additionally, several single trees – mostly old oaks in the forest district of Nowy Młyn; two groups of the Scots Pines (Nowy Młyn, Grodzisko near Starościn); there are also Populuses and Willows in the town; the only monument of the unanimated nature is a glacial erratic near the settlement of Gajec.
- The nearest nature reserves: the Torfowiska Sułowskie Peat Bog Reserve (an area included in the Natura 2000 Networking Programme, where a habitat of Aldrovanda vesiculosa has been introduced)
- Several ecological sites, most of which are within the borders of the National Forests, e.g. ‘Łąki’, ‘Wzdłuż Ilanki’, ’Przy Ilance’, ‘Wokół Jeziora Popienko’ (the habitat of Bog Orchid).

== Education ==
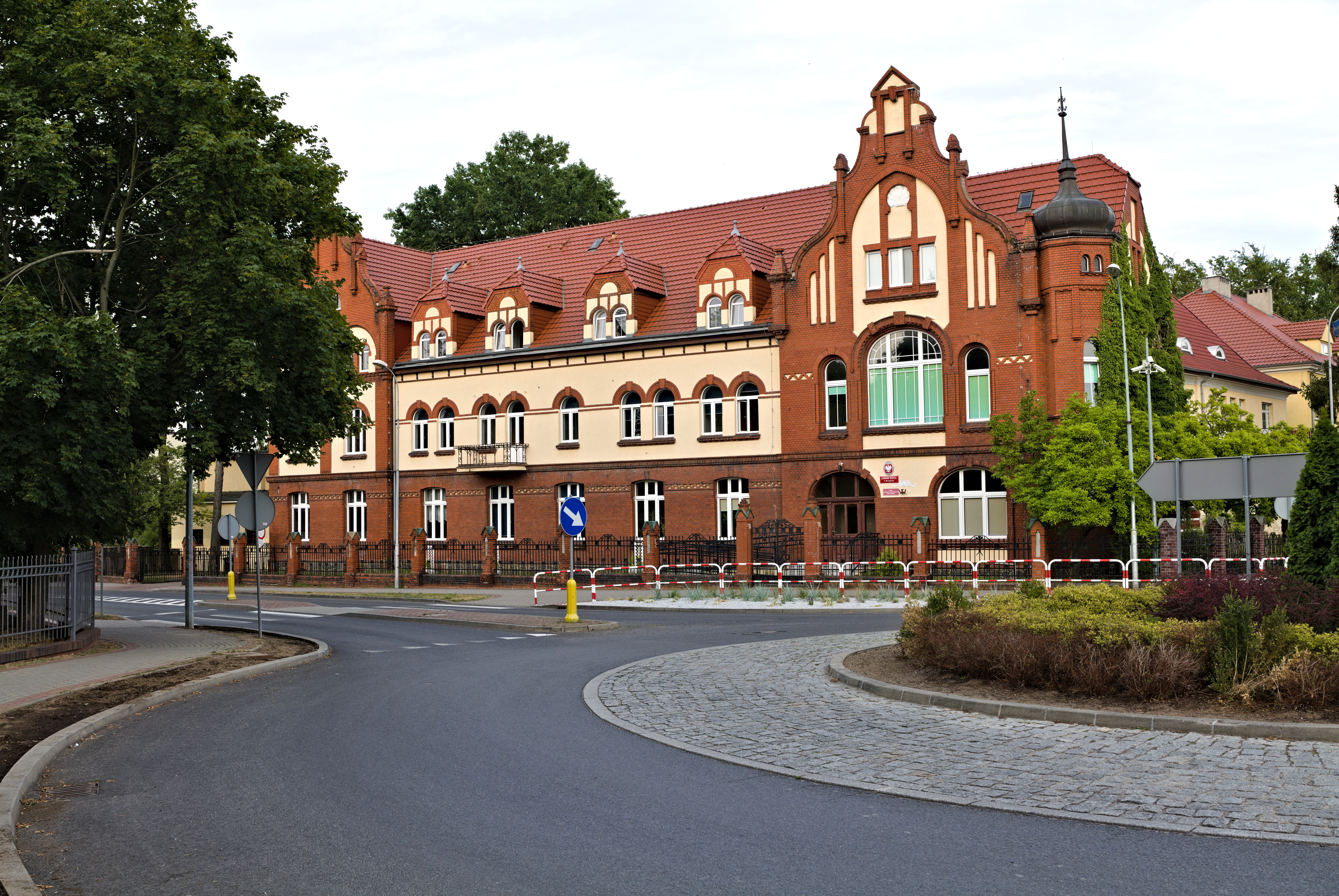
Elementary school

- Institutions of General Education:
  - Jan Kochanowski Gymnasium
  - Stanisław Staszic Secondary School
  - Henryk Sienkiewicz Elementary School
- Complex of Forest Schools in Starościn

== Culture ==
The ‘Chrobry’ Cinema that operates within the Community Cultural Center.

== Transport ==
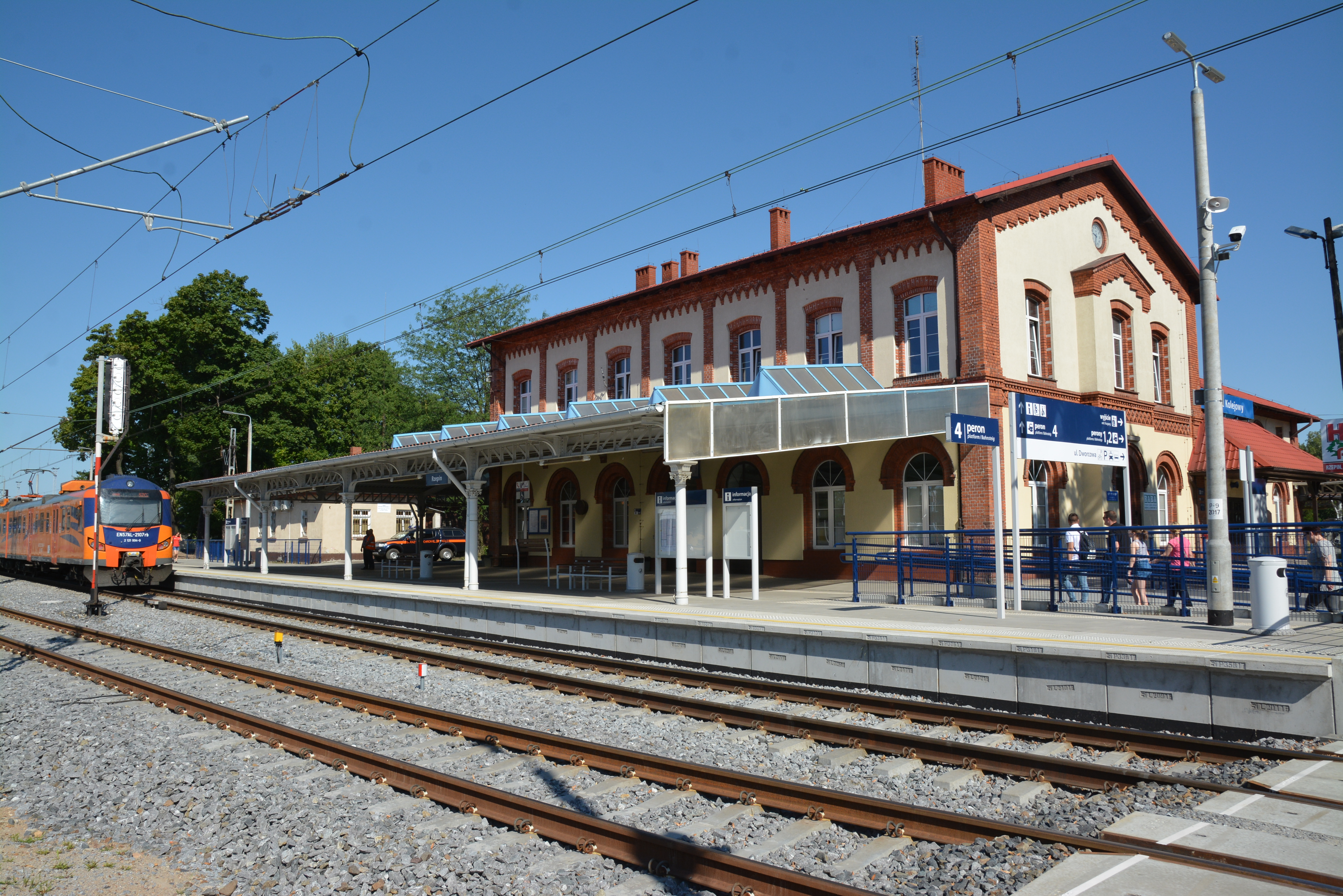
Rzepin railway station

- A2 motorway: Świecko – Rzepin – Świebodzin – Nowy Tomyśl – Poznań – Konin – Warsaw
  - National road 92: Rzepin – Torzym – Świebodzin – Nowy Tomyśl – Poznań – Konin – Kutno – Łowicz – Sochaczew – Warsaw
- Voivodship Road 134: Urad – Rzepin – Ośno Lubuskie – Badachów – National Road 22
- Voivodship Road 139: Górzyca – Kowalów – Rzepin – Gądków Wielki – Debrznica

=== Train connections ===
Rzepin has connections in

- east–west directions to Poznań, Warsaw, Frankfurt (Oder) and Berlin
- north–south directions to Szczecin, Zielona Góra and Wrocław.

=== Tourist trails ===
- Red: Rzepin Railway Station – Rzepin Square – Rzepin, J. Street – Rzepinek – Piast Oak – Grodno – Supno Lake – Głębokie Lake – Sądów – Drzeniów (further to Krosno Odrzańskie)
- Blue: Pliszka Railway Station – Ratno Lake – Pliszka – Dębrznica – Karasienko Lake – Torzym
- Green: Gądków Wielki Railway Station – Wielickie Lake (loop) – Pliszka Railway Station
- Yellow: a part of the long-distance European Kiliński walking route E11, Słubice – Drzecin – Stare Biskupice – The ‘Torfowiska Sułowskie’ Reserve – Sułów – Drzeńsko – Lubiechnia Wielka – Lubiechnia Mała – Czyste Wielkie Lake – Czyste Małe Lake – Ośno Lubuskie – Radachów – Trzebów (further in the direction of Lubniewice)

=== Bicycle trails ===
- Słubice – Drzecin – Stare Biskupice – Nowe Biskupice – Gajec – Rzepin – Rzepinek – Nowy Młyn – Jerzmanice Lubuskie – Radzikówek – Radzików – Sądów – Cybinka – Białków – the ‘Młodno’ Reserve – Krzesin
- Gajec – Nowy Młyn – Maczków – Urad (settlement) – Koziczyn – Sądów – Drzeniów
- Bobrówko – Pniów – Garbicz –Wielkie Lake –Karasienko Lake – Torzym Railway Station
- A part of the international route R1 (Kostrzyn n/Odrą) – Gronów – Ośno Lubuskie – Rożkowo – Grabno – Lubień – Brzeźno (Sulęcin)
- Additionally six short-distance cycling trails were blazed in the Rzepin Gmina. Similar trails exist in the adjacent gminas: Słubice and Ośno Lubuskie, but they are not connected.

== Notable people ==
- Ernst Wenck (1865–1929), German sculptor, professor of the German Academy of Fine Arts
- Johannes Wolburg (1905–1976), German geologist and paleontologist, pioneer of micropaleontology
- Stanisław Kusiak (1912–1989), priest of the Theological College in Słupsk, canon of the Cathedral Chapter in Gorzów Wielkopolski
- Marian Eckert (1932–2015), historian, professor of the University of Zielona Góra, the former voivode of the Zielona Góra Voivodeship
- Zbigniew Pusz (born 1949), politician and businessman
- Dariusz Muszer (born 1959), Polish-German writer, lived in Rzepin in 1959–1972

== Twin towns – sister cities ==
See twin towns of Gmina Rzepin.
