= Radow =

Radow may refer to:

- Radow, Iran (disambiguation)
- Radów, Poland
