= Gajec =

Gajec may refer to:

- Gajec, Poland, a village near Rzepin
- Gajec, Croatia, a village near Zagreb
