= Łubowice, Silesian Voivodeship =

Łubowice Lubowitz
- Village
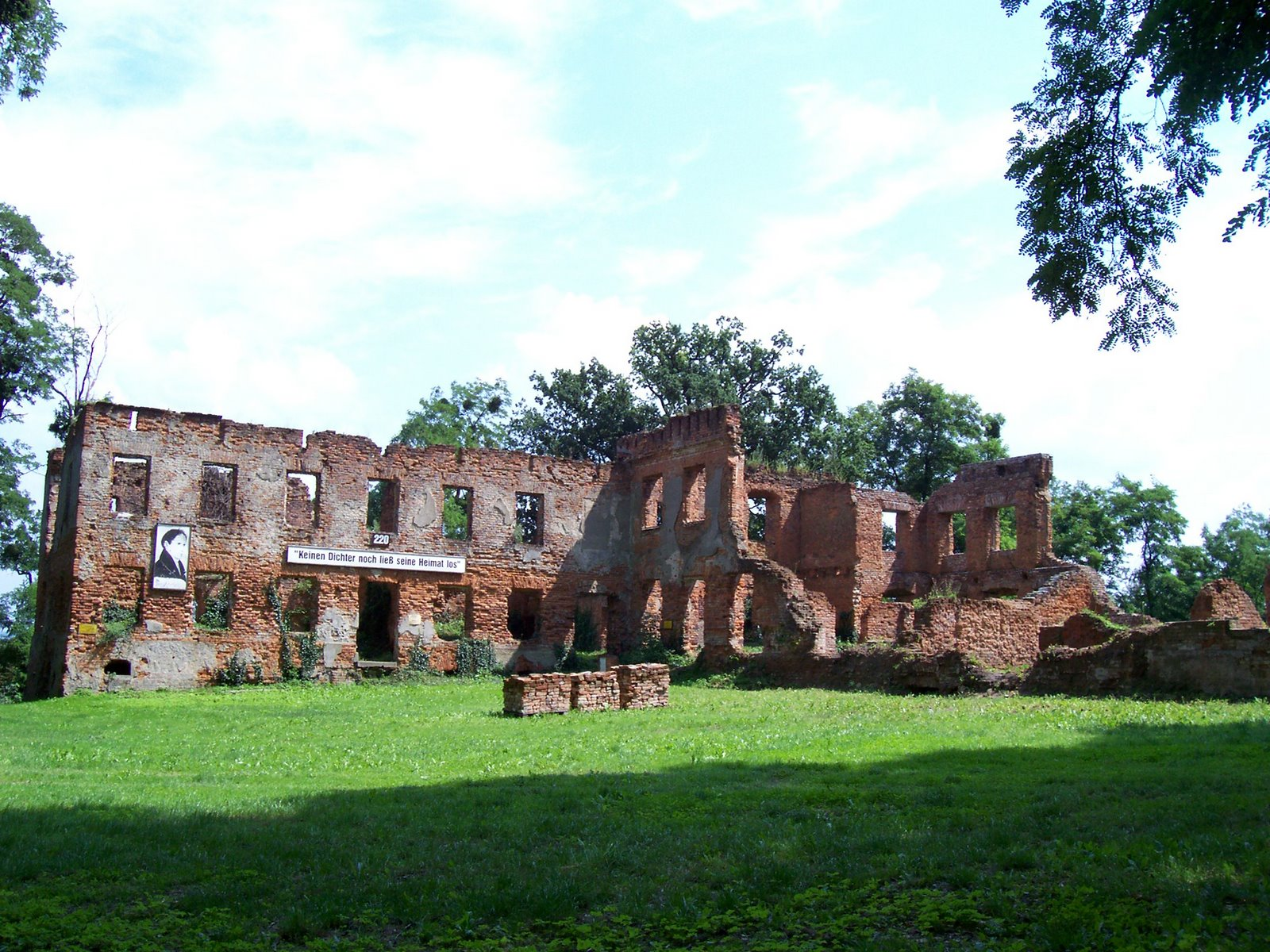
- Ruins of Łubowice Palace

- Location within Poland
- Coordinates: 50°9′41″N 18°14′9″E
- Country: Poland
- Voivodeship: Silesian
- County: Racibórz
- Gmina: Rudnik
- Population: 365
- Time zone: UTC+1 (CET)
  - Summer (DST): UTC+2 (CEST)
- Vehicle registration: SRC

Łubowice [wubɔˈvit͡sɛ] is a village in the administrative district of Gmina Rudnik, within Racibórz County, Silesian Voivodeship, in southern Poland. It is known as the birthplace of the German Romantic poet Joseph Freiherr von Eichendorff.

== Geography ==
It is situated in the historic Upper Silesia region, in the southeastern part of the Silesian Lowlands on the higher left bank of the Oder river, approximately 6 km (4 mi) north-east of Rudnik, 9 km (6 mi) north of Racibórz, and 56 km (35 mi) west of the regional capital Katowice.

== History ==
Archaeological findings denote a fortress possibly already existed at the site during the era of the Lusatian culture from the 9th century to the 6th century BC. In the 10th century the area became part of the emerging Polish state under the Piast dynasty. The settlement of Łubowice in the Upper Silesian Duchy of Racibórz was first mentioned in 1376 AD, when the duchy was held by the Czech Přemyslid dynasty under the suzerainty of the Lands of the Bohemian Crown. In 1521, it came back under the rule of the Piast dynasty and was integrated with the Duchy of Opole and Racibórz. In 1532, it was incorporated to the Bohemian (Czech) Crown, and in 1645 it returned to Polish rule under the House of Vasa. The village itself was a possession of various noble families, including Wraniński, Lichnowski and Harasowski. In the 18th century, the village was annexed by Prussia, and from 1871 it was also part of Germany. In the late 19th century, it had a population of 361.

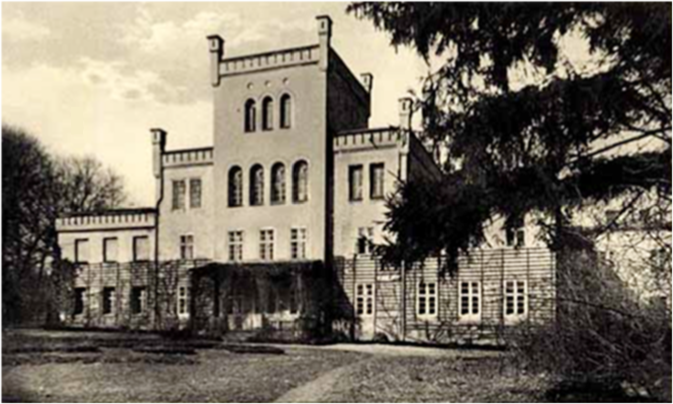
The palace c. 1939

Łubowice Palace (Pałac Eichendorffów), south of the village, was the birthplace of Joseph von Eichendorff in 1788. The Eichendorff noble family, originally from Serbów in the Neumark region, had acquired the manor in 1784. It remained the domicile of Joseph von Eichendorff's mother Karoline until her death in 1822, after which it was sold by auction and later purchased by Salomon Mayer von Rothschild. From 1852 it was a possession of Prince Victor of Hohenlohe-Schillingsfürst and his descendants, who bore the title of a "Duke of Ratibor" (Racibórz) since 1840. The palace was largely rebuilt in a Tudor style from 1858 to 1862. It was leased to the Eichendorff literary society in 1938.

In the 1921 Upper Silesia plebiscite, 75.5% of the residents voted to rejoin Poland, which just regained independence following World War I, however the village remained within Germany in the interbellum. During World War II, the Germans operated the E396 forced labour subcamp of the Stalag VIII-B/344 prisoner-of-war camp in the village. The site of a Wehrmacht artillery post in the late days of World War II, the castle was heavily bombed and burnt down completely during the Red Army Vistula-Oder Offensive. After Germany's defeat in the war, in 1945, the village became again part of Poland.

On 14 November 1989, during the Revolutions of 1989, the Polish prime minister Tadeusz Mazowiecki and German chancellor Helmut Kohl agreed to preserve the common heritage at Łubowice. A Polish Eichendorff association was founded and an Upper Silesian cultural and meeting centre opened at Łubowice on 12 July 2000. The castle's reconstruction is a matter of ongoing discussions.

== Gallery ==
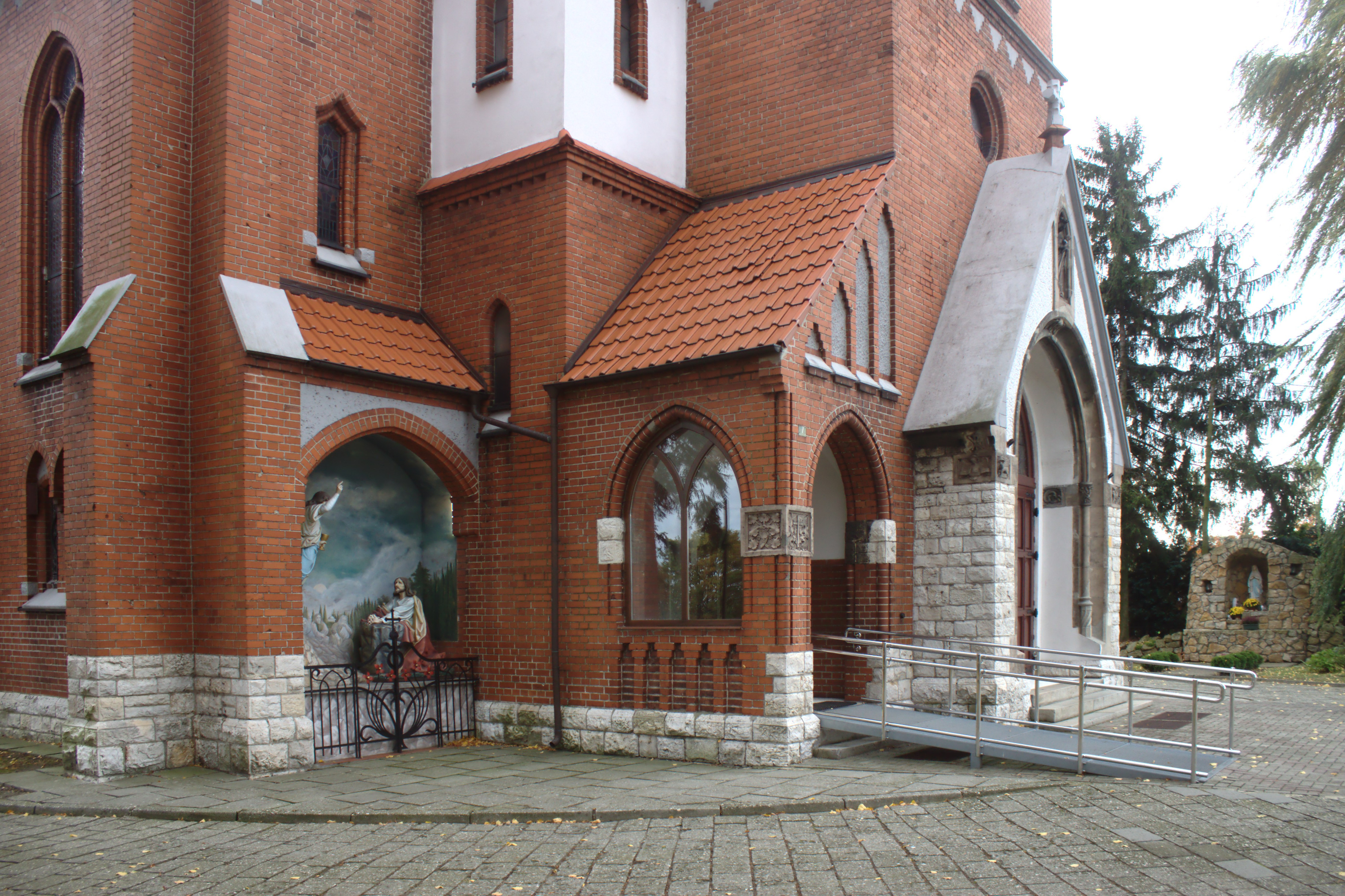
Church

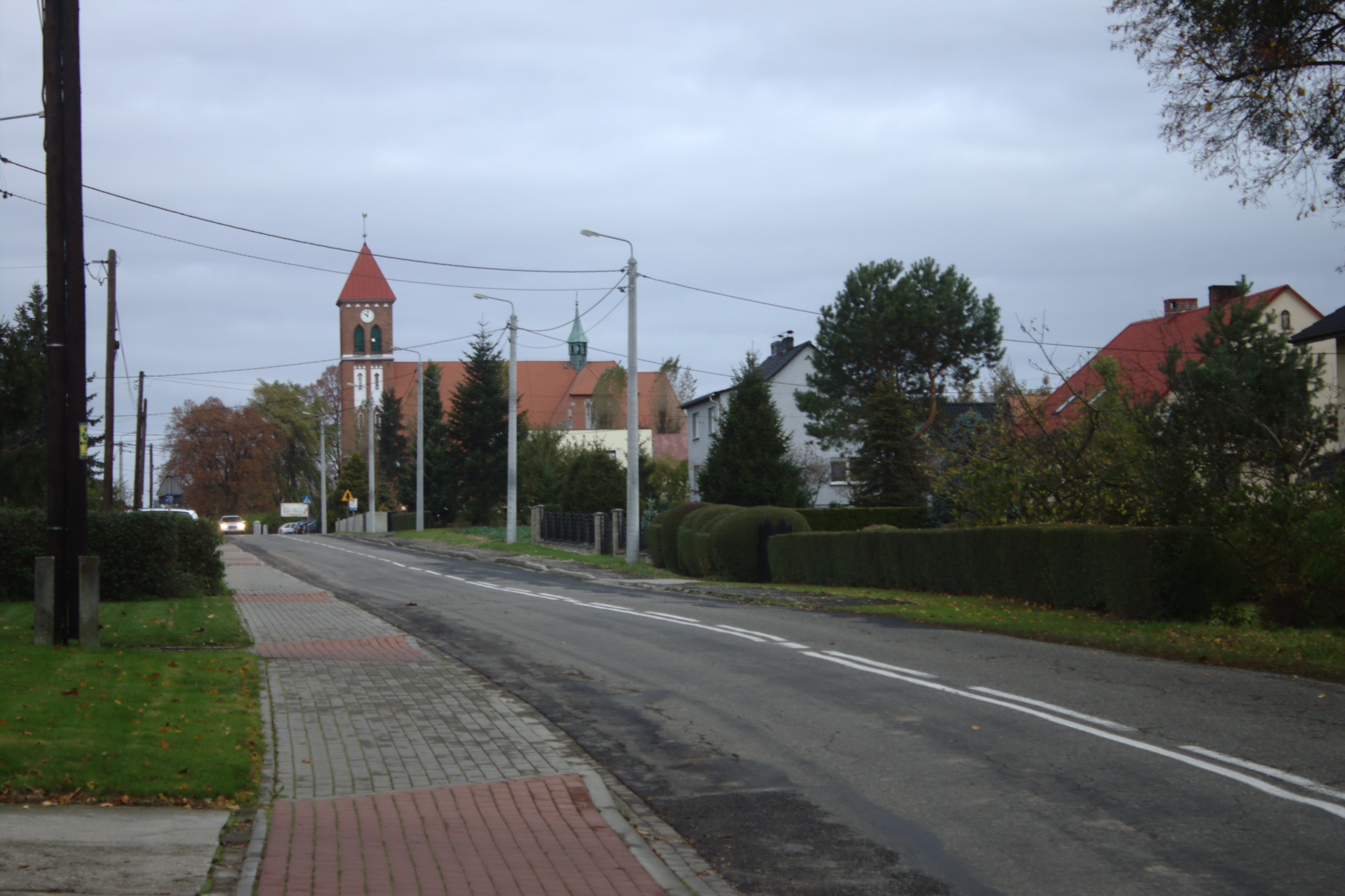
Main road

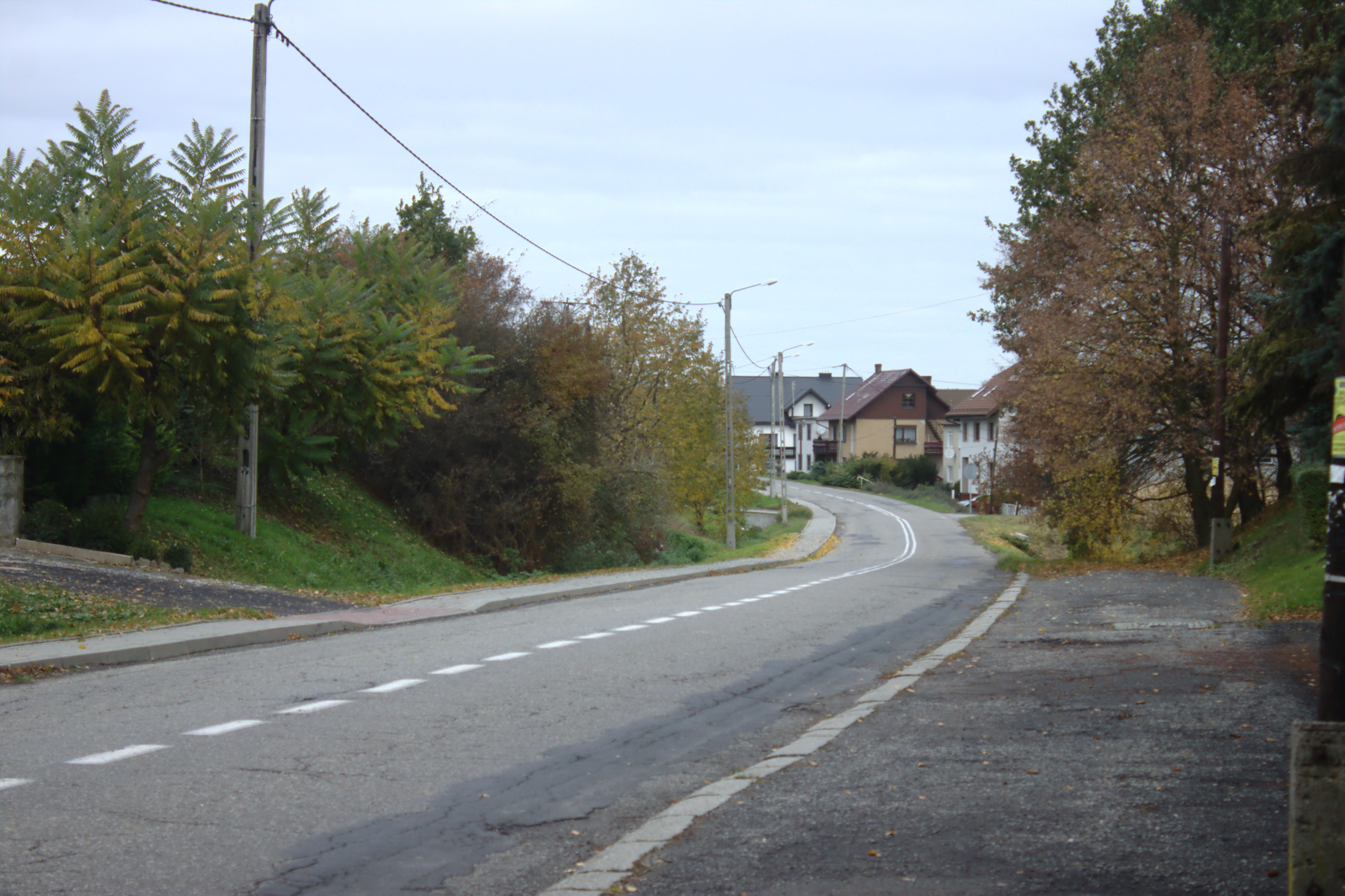
Road to the village
