= Starków =

Starków may refer to the following places in Poland:

- Starków, Lower Silesian Voivodeship (south-west Poland)
- Starków, Lubusz Voivodeship (west Poland)
- Starków, Szczecin
