= Gmina Rzepin =

Gmina Rzepin Rzepin Commune
- Gmina
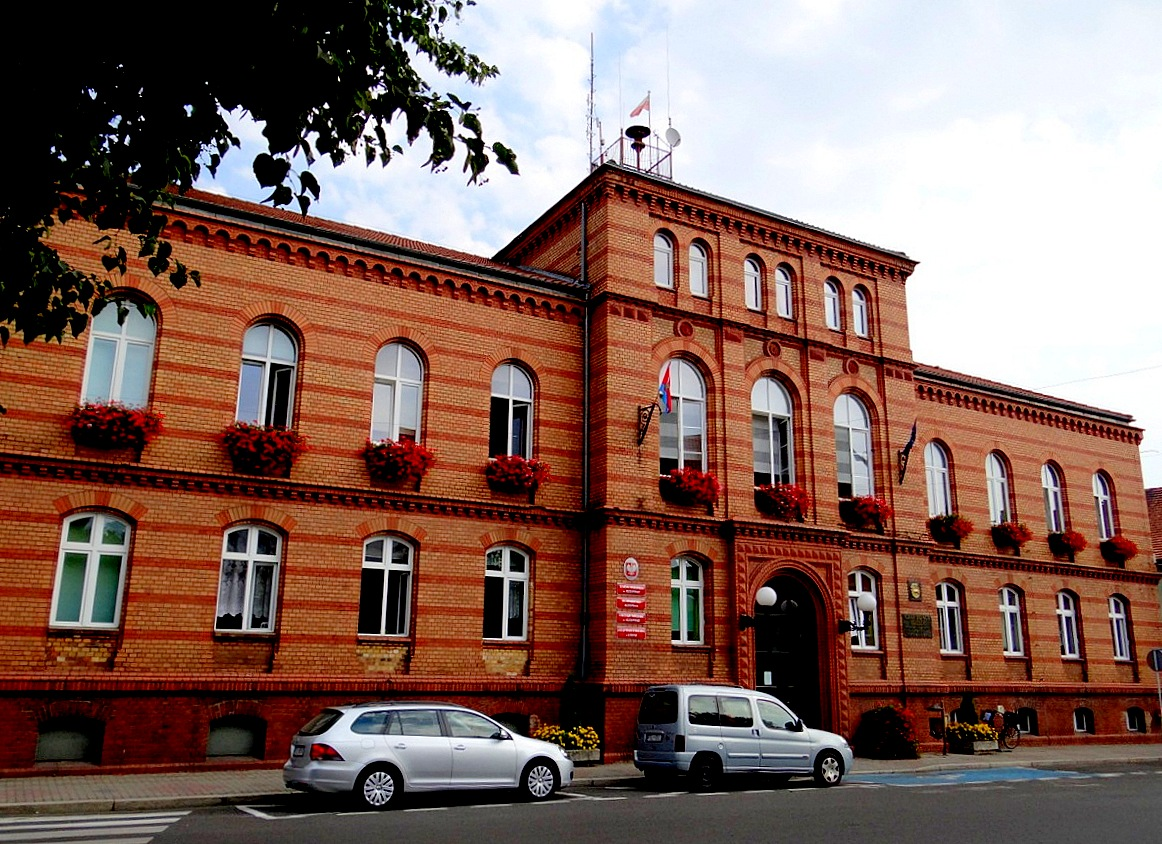
- Town Hall in Rzepin, seat of the gmina office

- Coat of arms
- Interactive map of Gmina Rzepin
- Coordinates (Rzepin): 52°21′N 14°50′E
- Country: Poland
- Voivodeship: Lubusz
- County: Słubice
- Seat: Rzepin

Area
  - Total: 191.11 km^{2} (73.79 sq mi)

Population (2019-06-30)
  - Total: 9,745
  - Density: 50.99/km^{2} (132.1/sq mi)
  - Urban: 6,529
  - Rural: 3,216
- Time zone: UTC+1 (CET)
  - Summer (DST): UTC+2 (CEST)
- Vehicle registration: FSL
- Website: http://www.rzepin.pl

Gmina Rzepin is an urban-rural gmina (administrative district) in Słubice County, Lubusz Voivodeship, in western Poland. Its seat is the town of Rzepin, which lies approximately 19 kilometres (12 mi) east of Słubice, 52 km (32 mi) south-west of Gorzów Wielkopolski, and 65 km (40 mi) north-west of Zielona Góra.

The gmina covers an area of 191.11 square kilometres (73.8 sq mi), and as of 2019 its total population is 9,745.

== Villages ==
Apart from the town of Rzepin, Gmina Rzepin contains the villages and settlements of Drzeńsko, Gajec, Jerzmanice, Kowalów, Lubiechnia Mała, Lubiechnia Wielka, Maniszewo, Nowy Młyn, Radów, Rzepinek, Serbów, Starków, Starościn, Sułów and Zielony Bór.

== Neighbouring gminas ==
Gmina Rzepin is bordered by the gminas of Cybinka, Górzyca, Ośno Lubuskie, Słubice and Torzym.

== Twin towns – sister cities ==
Gmina Rzepin is twinned with:

- Hoppegarten, Germany
