= Rzepinek, Lubusz Voivodeship =

Rzepinek
- Village
- Location within Poland
- Coordinates: 52°19′23″N 14°50′1″E
- Country: Poland
- Voivodeship: Lubusz
- County: Słubice
- Gmina: Rzepin
- Population: 10

Rzepinek [ʐɛˈpinɛk] is a village in the administrative district of Gmina Rzepin, within Słubice County, Lubusz Voivodeship, in western Poland.
