= Zielony Bór =

Village in Lubusz Voivodeship, Poland

- Village
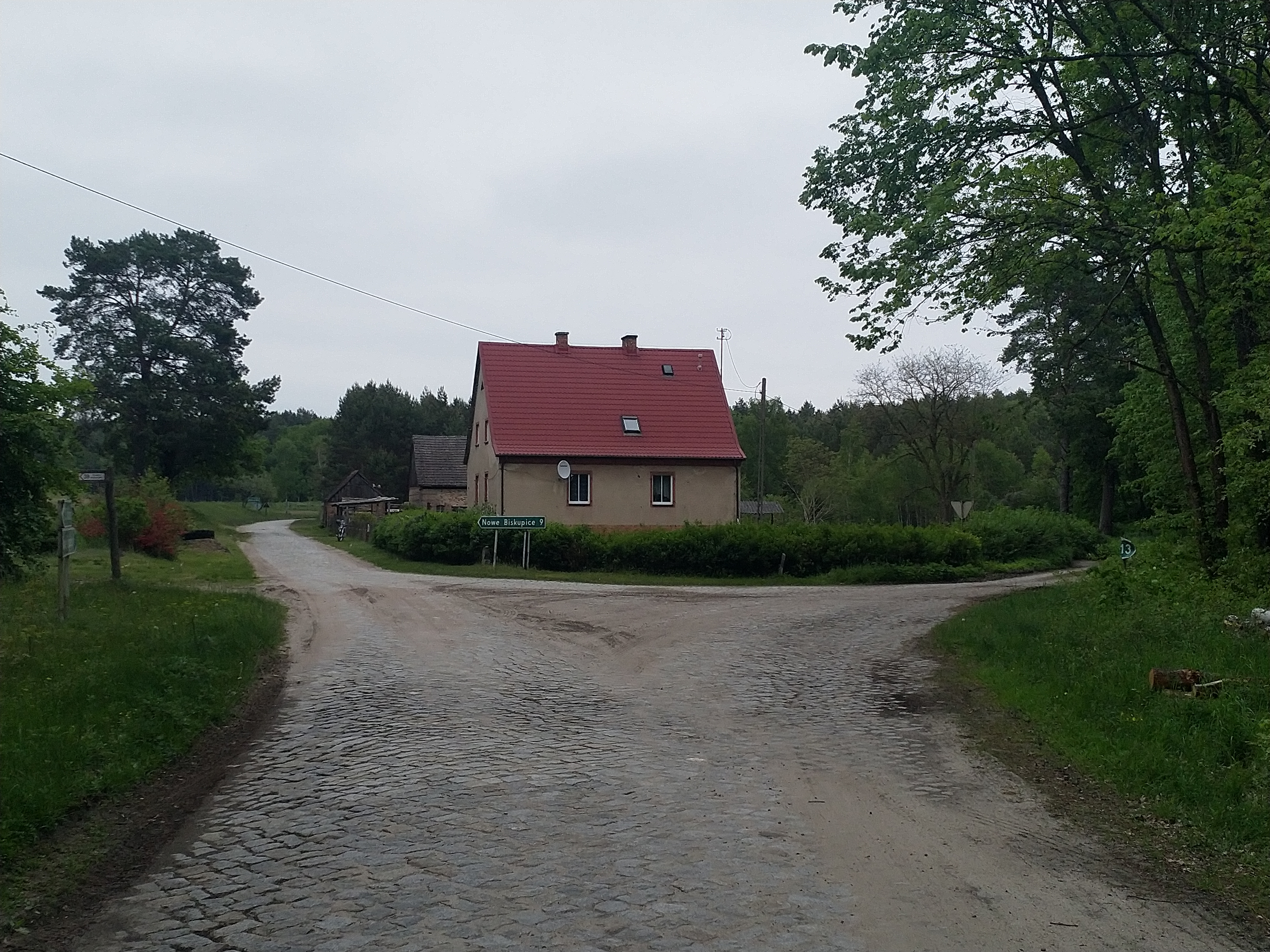

- Location within Poland
- Coordinates: 52°17′54″N 14°40′40″E
- Country: Poland
- Voivodeship: Lubusz
- County: Słubice
- Gmina: Rzepin
- Population: 10

Zielony Bór (Polish pronunciation: [ʑɛˈlɔnɨ ˈbur]) is a village in the administrative district of Gmina Rzepin, within Słubice County, Lubusz Voivodeship, in western Poland.
