= Nowy Młyn, Lubusz Voivodeship =

Nowy Młyn
- Village
- Location within Poland
- Coordinates: 52°18′23″N 14°48′47″E
- Country: Poland
- Voivodeship: Lubusz
- County: Słubice
- Gmina: Rzepin
- Population: 20

Nowy Młyn [ˈnɔvɨ ˈmwɨn] is a village in the administrative district of Gmina Rzepin, within Słubice County, Lubusz Voivodeship, in western Poland.
