= Sułów, Lubusz Voivodeship =

Sułów
- Village
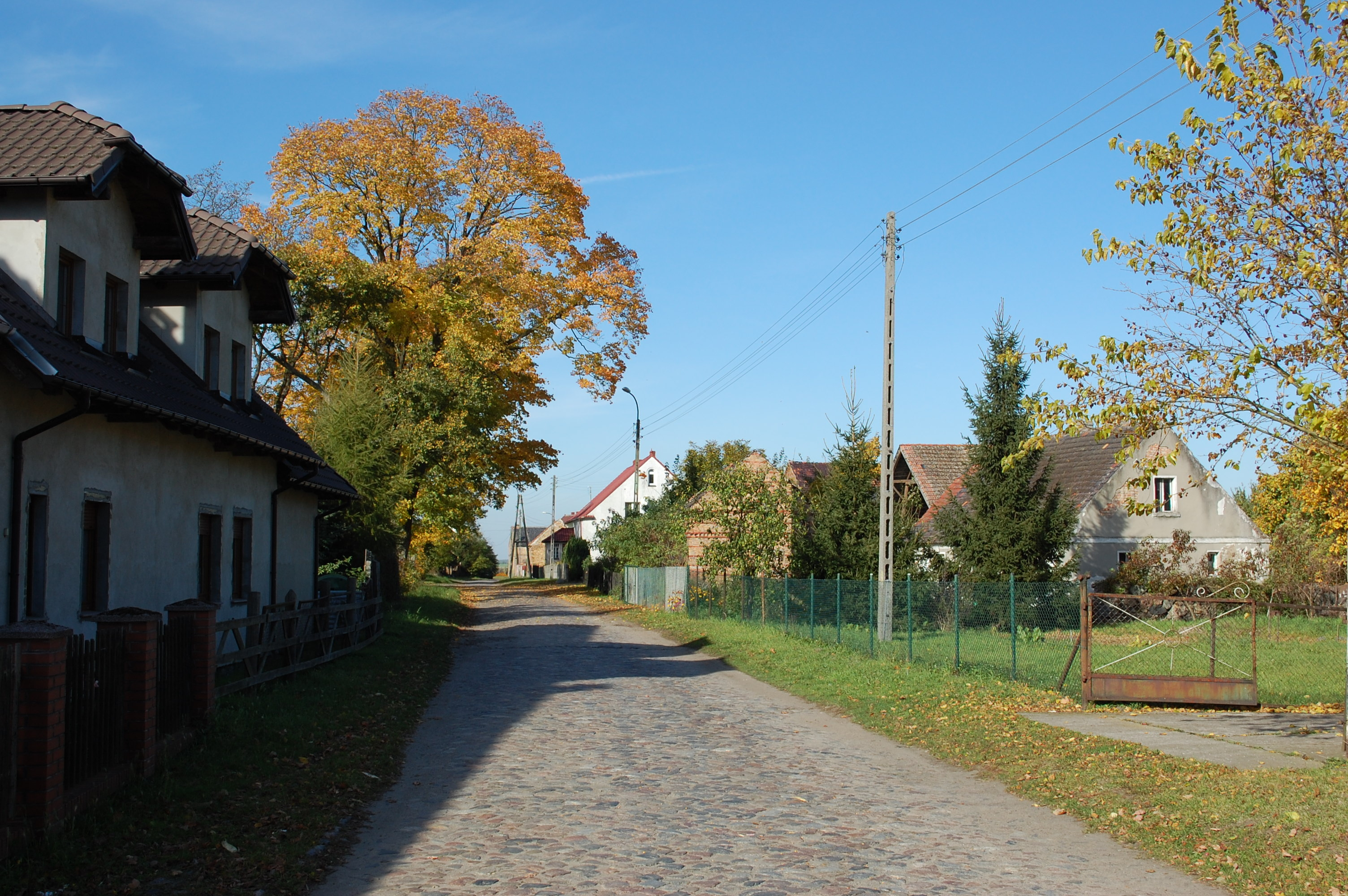

- Location within Poland
- Coordinates: 52°22′56″N 14°44′06″E
- Country: Poland
- Voivodeship: Lubusz
- County: Słubice
- Gmina: Rzepin
- Population: 260

Sułów [ˈsuwuf] is a village in the administrative district of Gmina Rzepin, within Słubice County, Lubusz Voivodeship, in western Poland.
