= Radu, Iran =

Radu or Radow (Persian: رادو) in Iran may refer to:

- Radu-ye Pain
- Radu-ye Polan
