= Lubiechnia Mała =

- Village
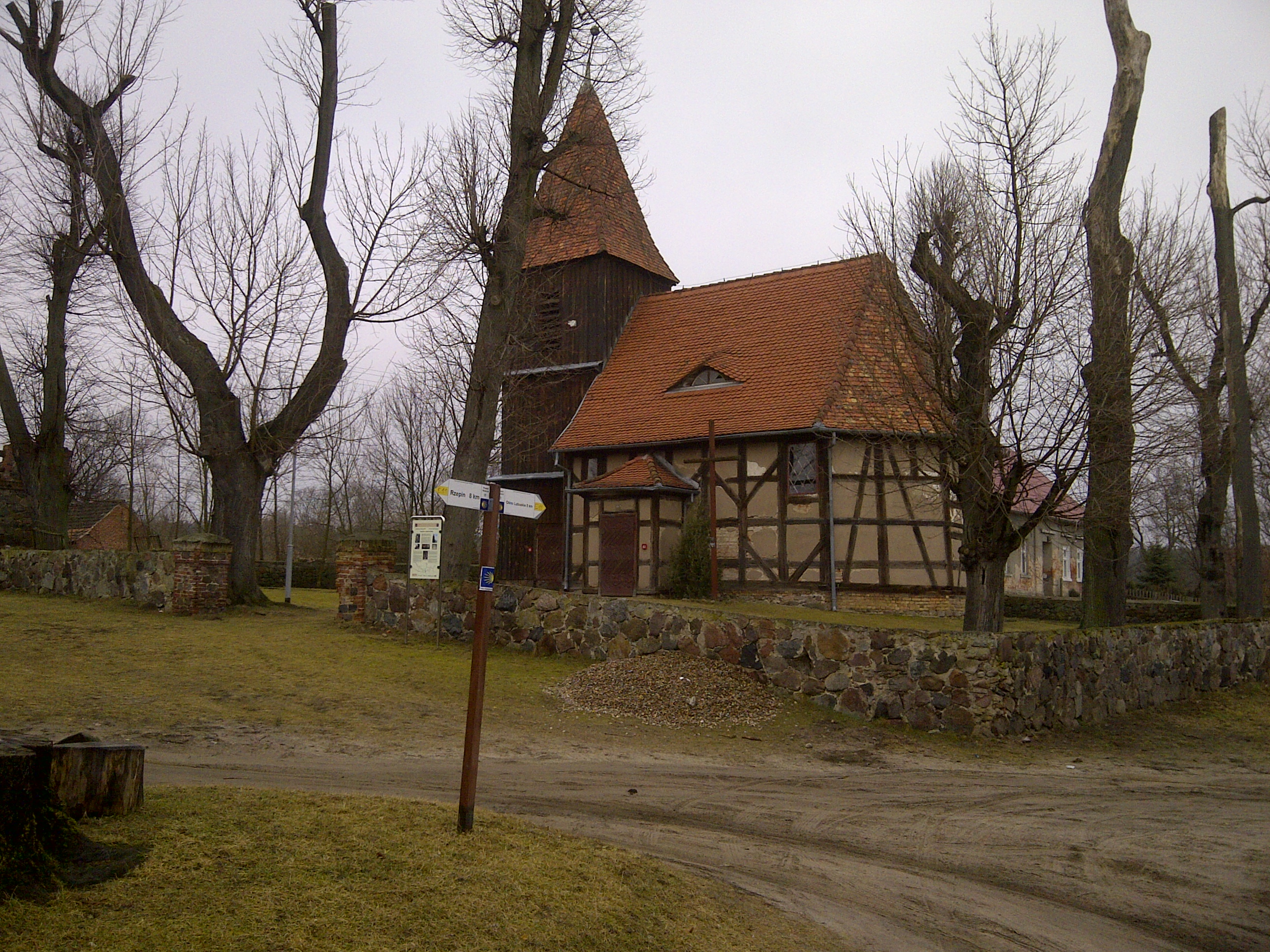

- Location within Poland
- Coordinates: 52°24′17″N 14°50′37″E
- Country: Poland
- Voivodeship: Lubusz
- County: Słubice
- Gmina: Rzepin
- Population: 60

Lubiechnia Mała [luˈbjɛxɲa ˈmawa] is a village in the administrative district of Gmina Rzepin, within Słubice County, Lubusz Voivodeship, in western Poland.
