= Jerzmanice =

- Village
- Location within Poland
- Coordinates: 52°18′44″N 14°51′43″E
- Country: Poland
- Voivodeship: Lubusz
- County: Słubice
- Gmina: Rzepin
- Population: 10

Jerzmanice [jɛʐmaˈnit͡sɛ] is a village in the administrative district of Gmina Rzepin, within Słubice County, Lubusz Voivodeship, in western Poland.
