= Lubiechnia Wielka =

- Village
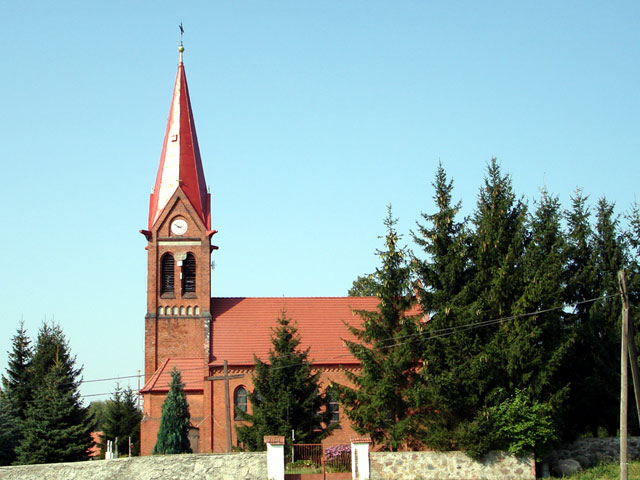

- Location within Poland
- Coordinates: 52°22′57″N 14°48′45″E
- Country: Poland
- Voivodeship: Lubusz
- County: Słubice
- Gmina: Rzepin
- Population: 501

Lubiechnia Wielka [luˈbjɛxɲa ˈvjɛlka] is a village in the administrative district of Gmina Rzepin, within Słubice County, Lubusz Voivodeship, in western Poland.
