= Maniszewo =

- Village
- Location within Poland
- Coordinates: 52°24′28″N 14°47′29″E
- Country: Poland
- Voivodeship: Lubusz
- County: Słubice
- Gmina: Rzepin
- Population: 20

Maniszewo [maniˈʂɛvɔ] is a village in the administrative district of Gmina Rzepin, within Słubice County, Lubusz Voivodeship, in western Poland.
