= Serbów =

- Village
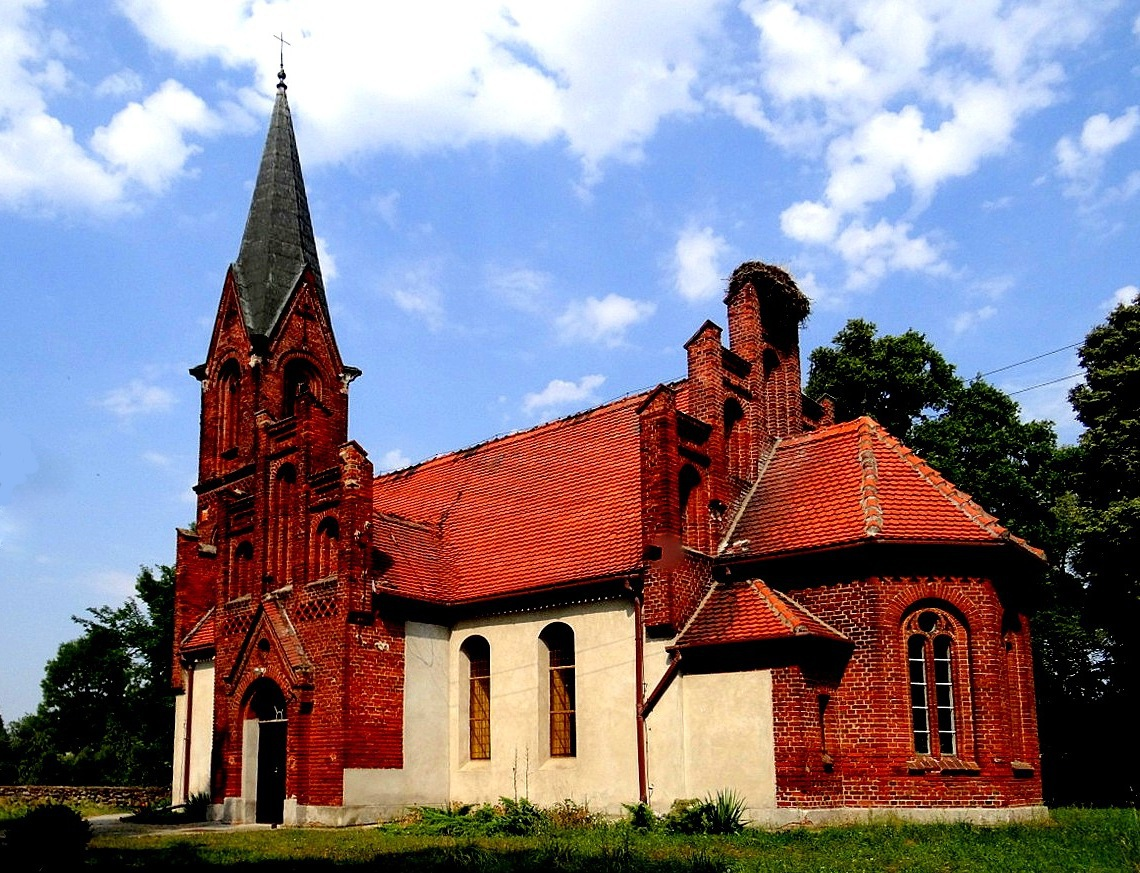
- Catholic church

- Location within Poland
- Coordinates: 52°25′N 14°48′E
- Country: Poland
- Voivodeship: Lubusz
- County: Słubice
- Gmina: Rzepin
- Population: 270

Serbów [ˈsɛrbuf] is a village in the administrative district of Gmina Rzepin, within Słubice County, Lubusz Voivodeship, in western Poland.
