= Radu-ye Polan =

Radu-ye Polan رادو پلان
- Village
- Location within Iran
- Coordinates: 25°36′44″N 61°07′12″E
- Country: Iran
- Province: Sistan and Baluchestan
- County: Chabahar
- Bakhsh: Polan
- Rural District: Polan

Population (2006)
  - Total: 518
- Time zone: UTC+3:30 (IRST)
  - Summer (DST): UTC+4:30 (IRDT)

Radu-ye Polan (Persian: رادو پلان, also Romanized as Rādū-ye Polān; also known as Rādū-ye Bālā) is a village in Polan Rural District, Polan District, Chabahar County, Sistan and Baluchestan Province, Iran. At the 2006 census, its population was 518, in 105 families.
