= Kowalów, Lubusz Voivodeship =

Kowalów
- Village
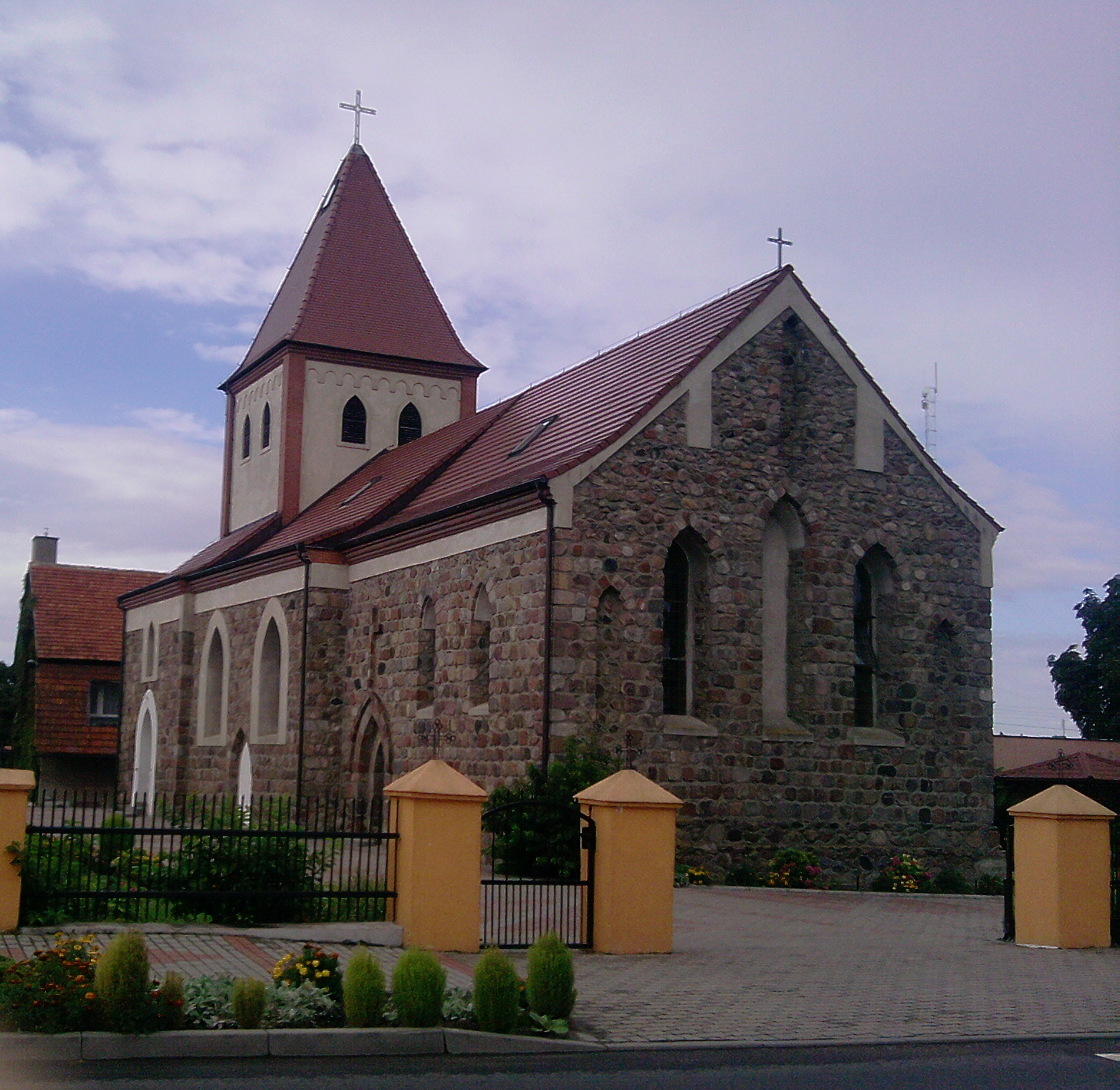
- Church

- Location within Poland
- Coordinates: 52°24′2″N 14°45′35″E
- Country: Poland
- Voivodeship: Lubusz
- County: Słubice
- Gmina: Rzepin
- Population: 1,000

Kowalów [kɔˈvaluf] is a village in the administrative district of Gmina Rzepin, within Słubice County, Lubusz Voivodeship, in western Poland.

== History ==
The oldest surviving document from the village Kohlow 1405, but the village had already been founded in the thirteenth century, as evidenced by the historic church from the late Roman period 1250–1270. The village was the centre of an estate owned until 1945 was the family of von Kaphengst-Kohlow.

February 2, 1945 the village was occupied by Soviet troops, which in April submitted her Polish administration. Existing inhabitants were dispossessed and deported to Germany.

In 1945-1954 and 1973-1976 the area was the seat of the municipality Kowalów. In 1954-1972 the village was the seat of the National Council district. In 1975-1998 the area administratively belonged to the population of Gorzow.

== Transport ==
=== Road transport ===
Kowalów is located on two provincial roads: 137 Slubice-Kowalów-Miedzyrzecz-Trzciel and 139 Górzyca-Kowalów-Rzepin-Debrznica.

=== Rail transport ===
In Kowalowie is Kowalów station, which is located on the railway line No 273 Nadodrzance connecting Wroclaw Central from the Szczecin Square.

Direct rail connections make it possible to reach all points on the line. Only stop passenger trains REGIO.

== Photos ==
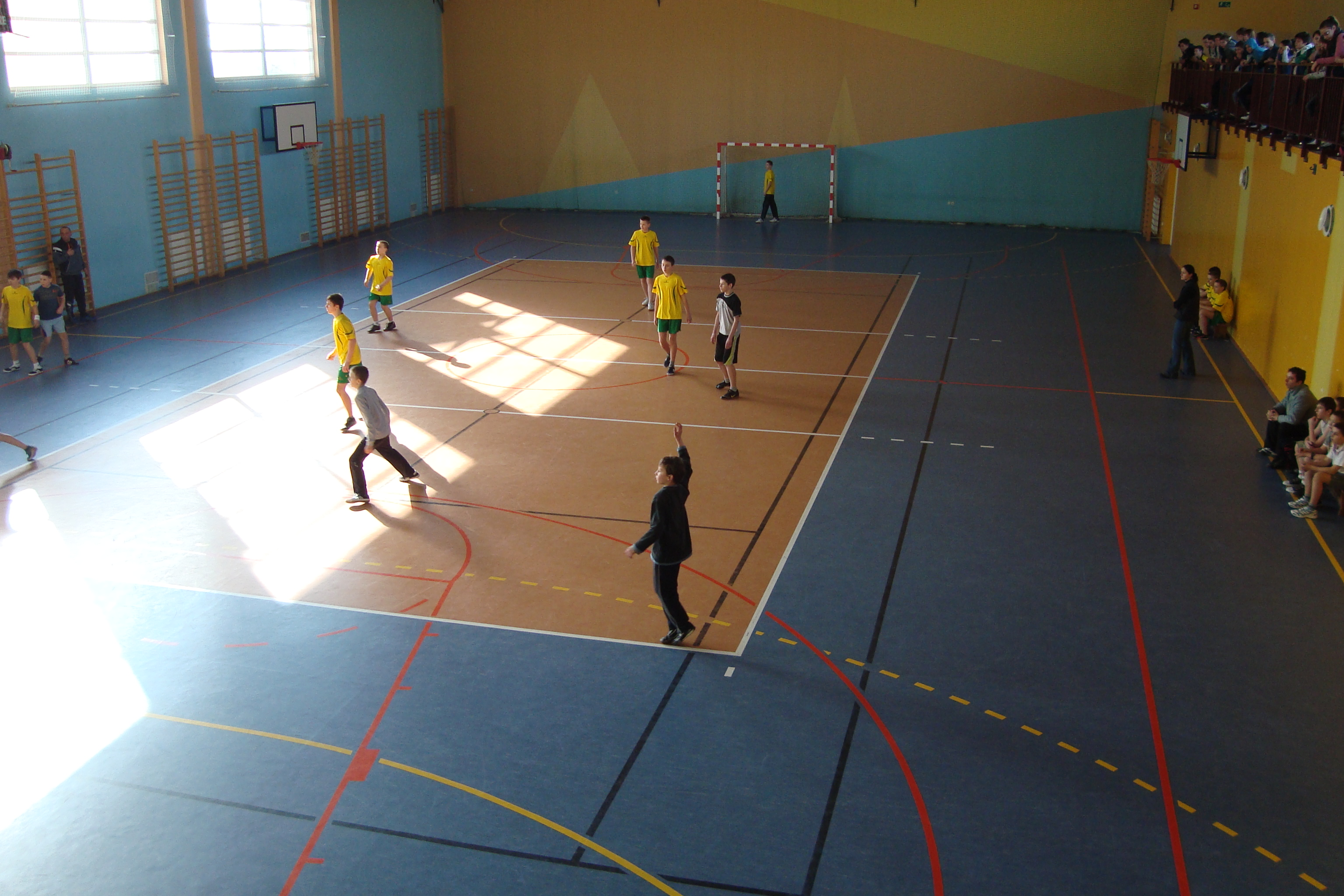
Athletic Hall of Kowalów

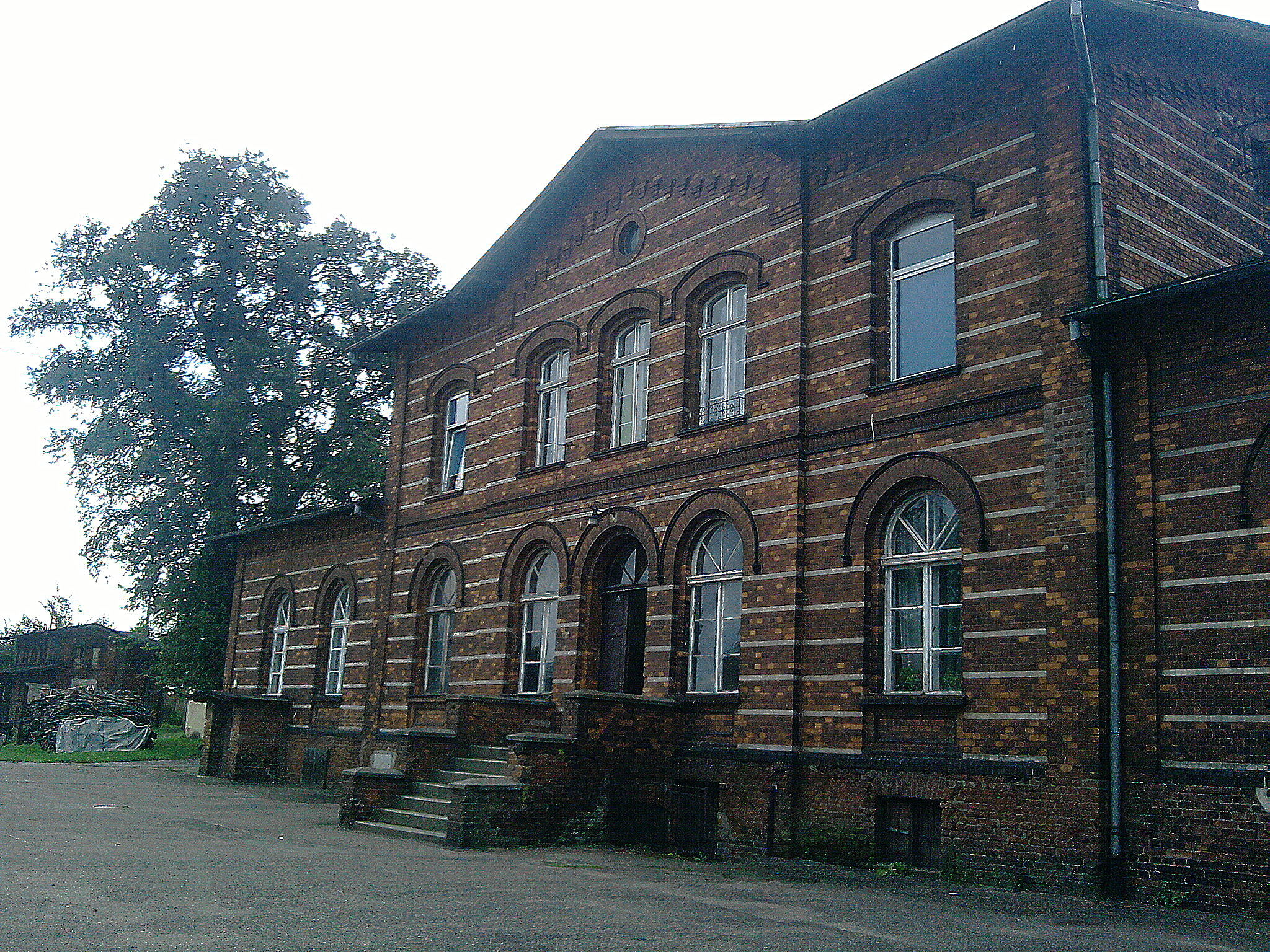
Railway station PKP

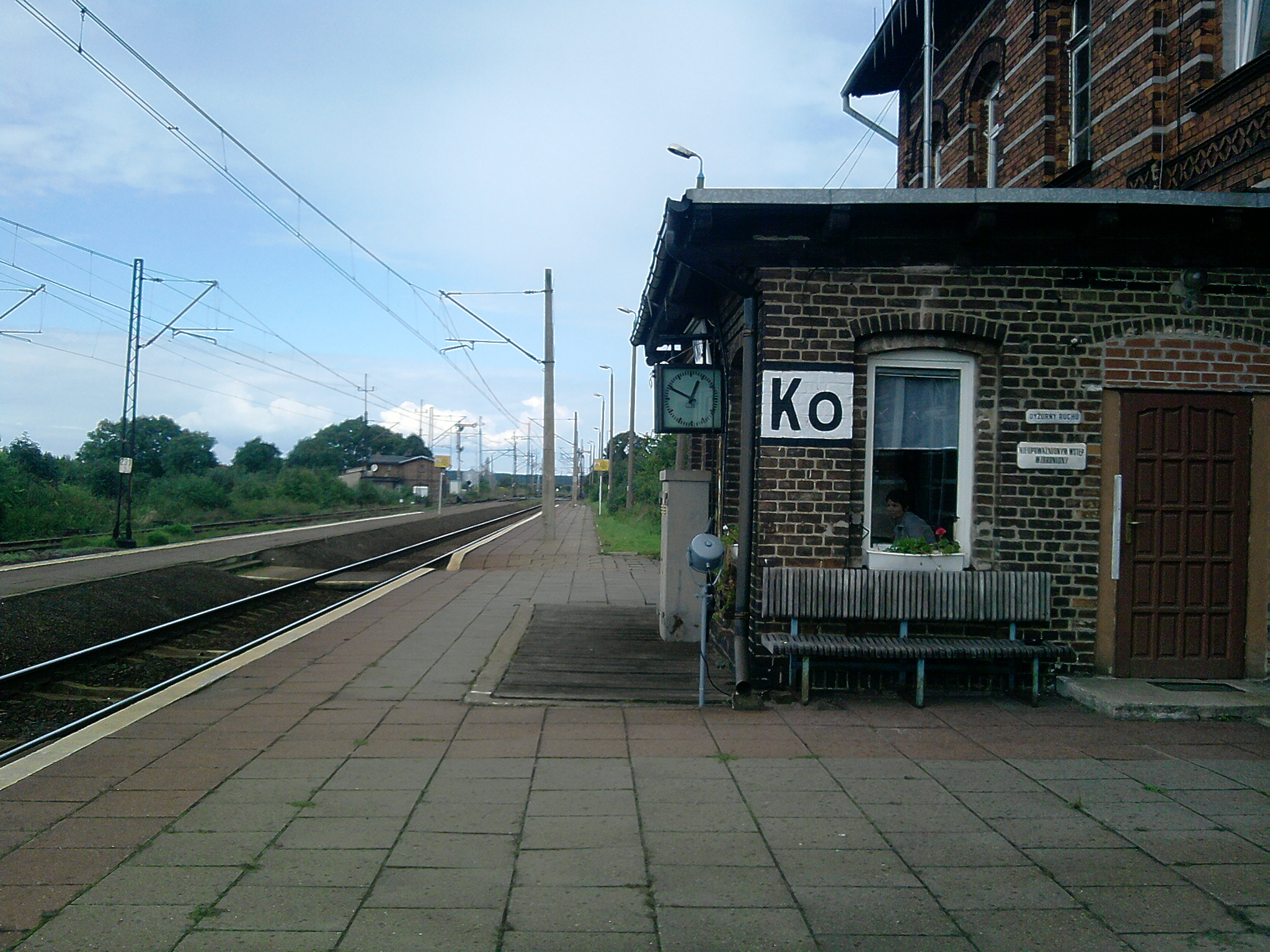
Railway station PKP

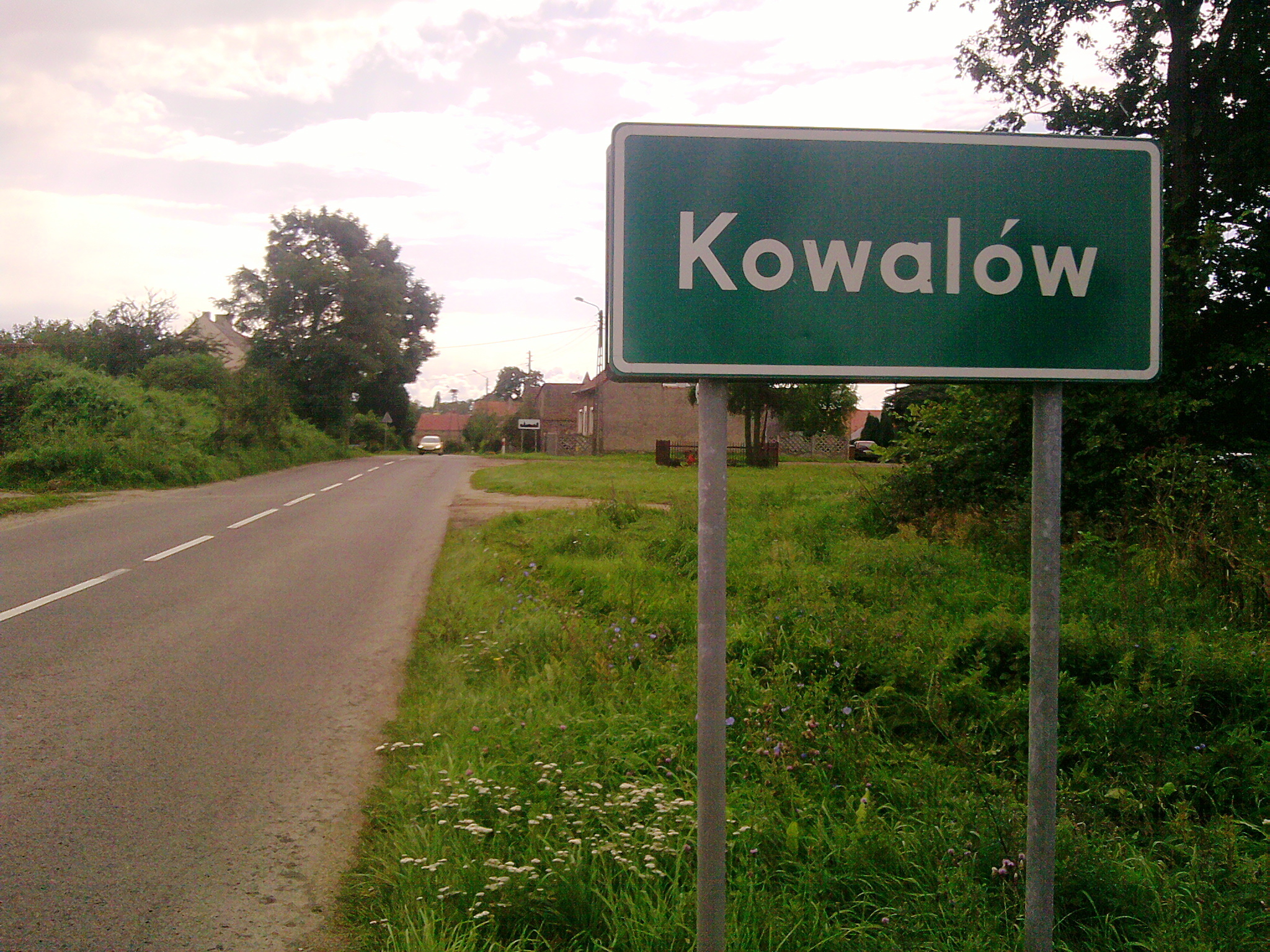
Entrance to Kowalów

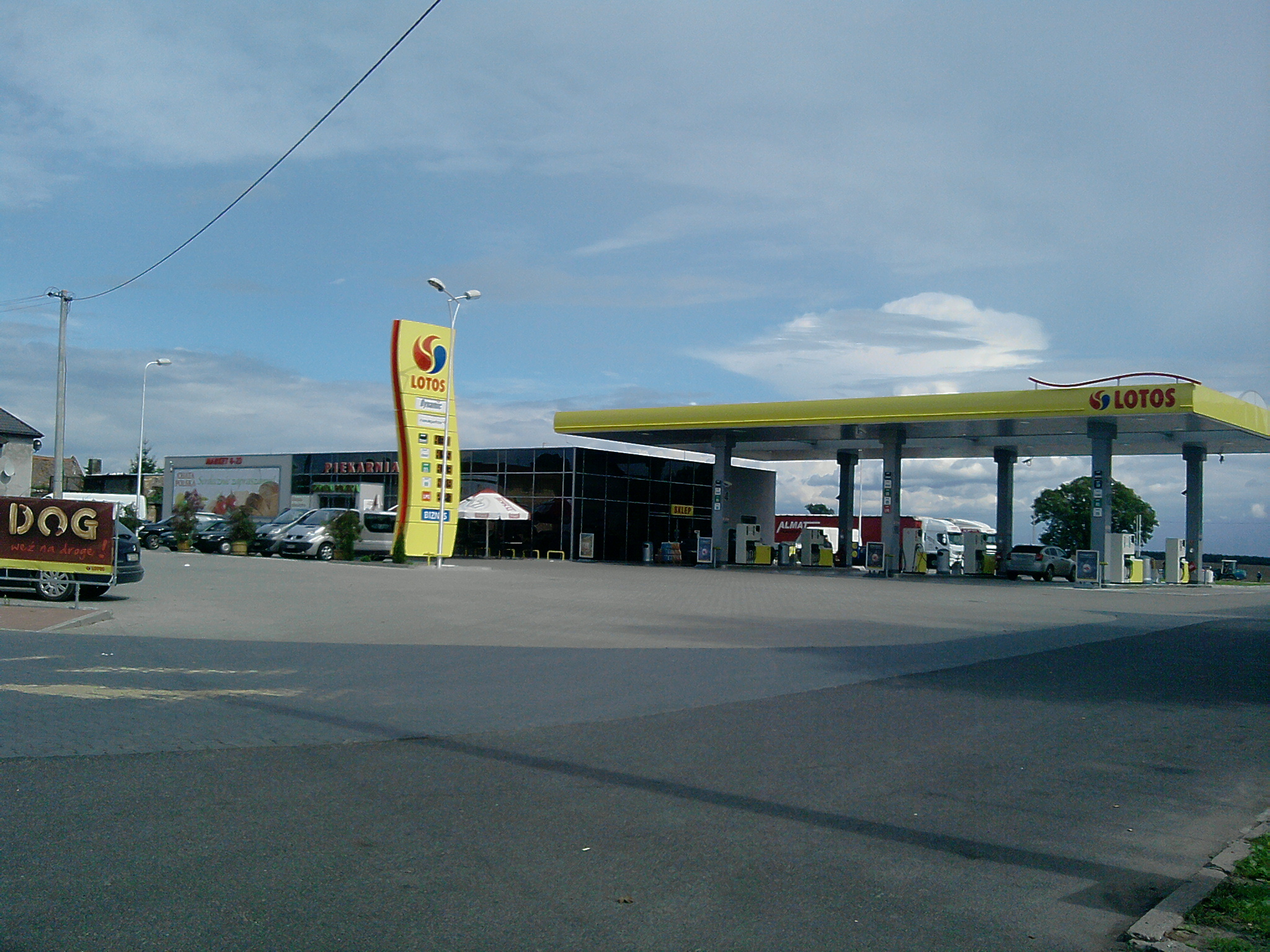
The gas station and supermarket Chata Polska

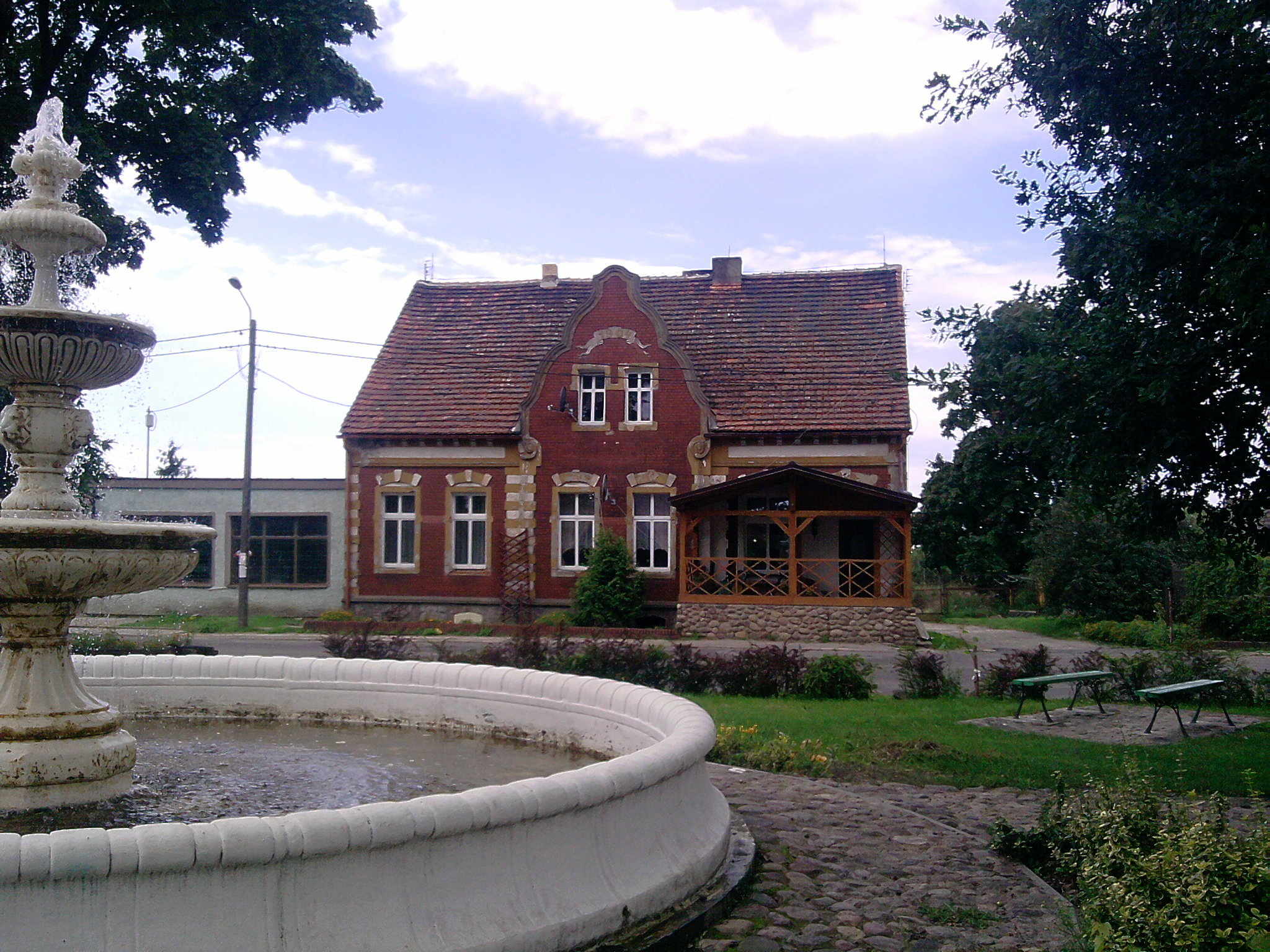
One of the oldest buildings in Kowalów

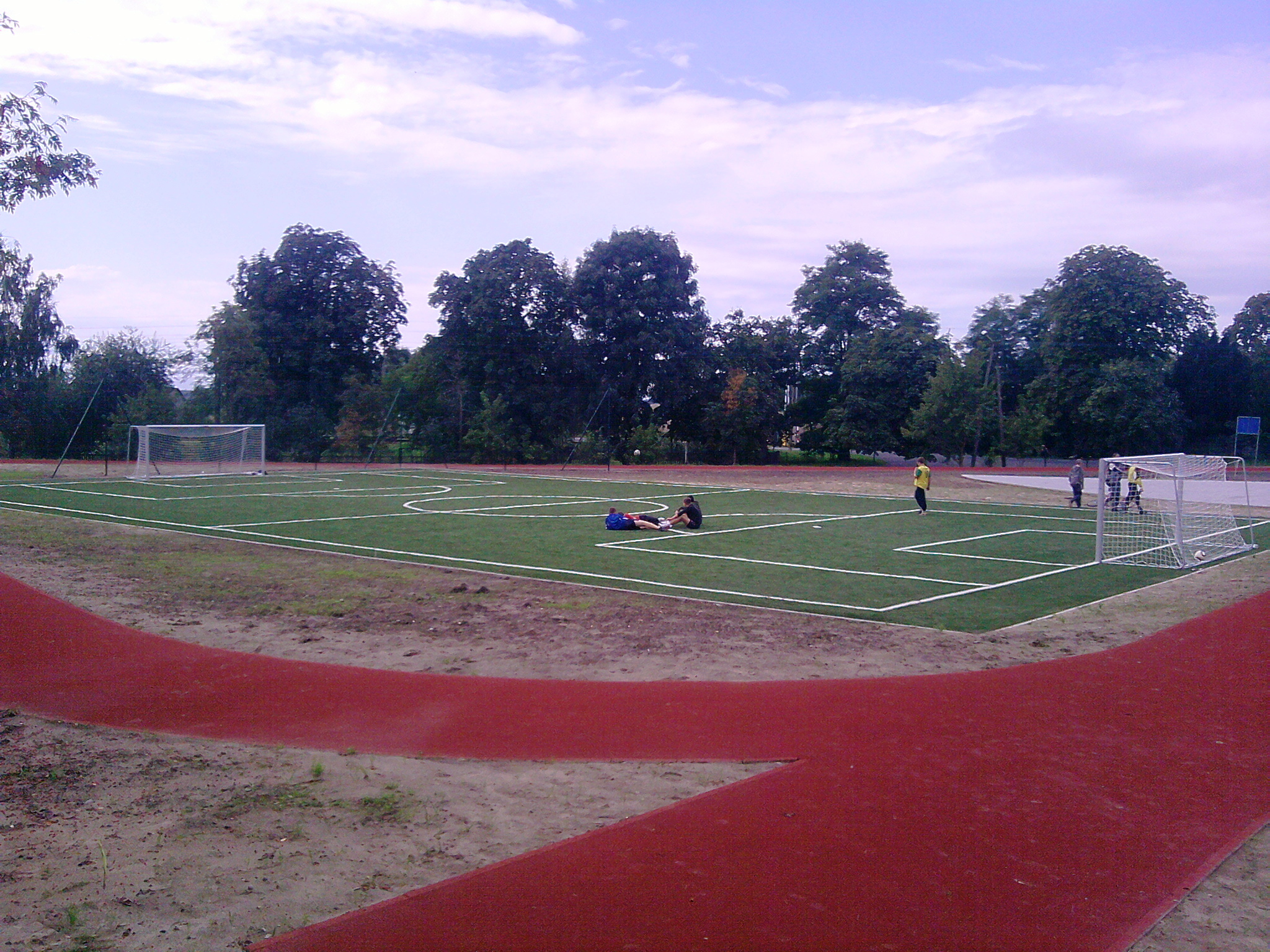
Sports complex at the School Complex in Kowalów

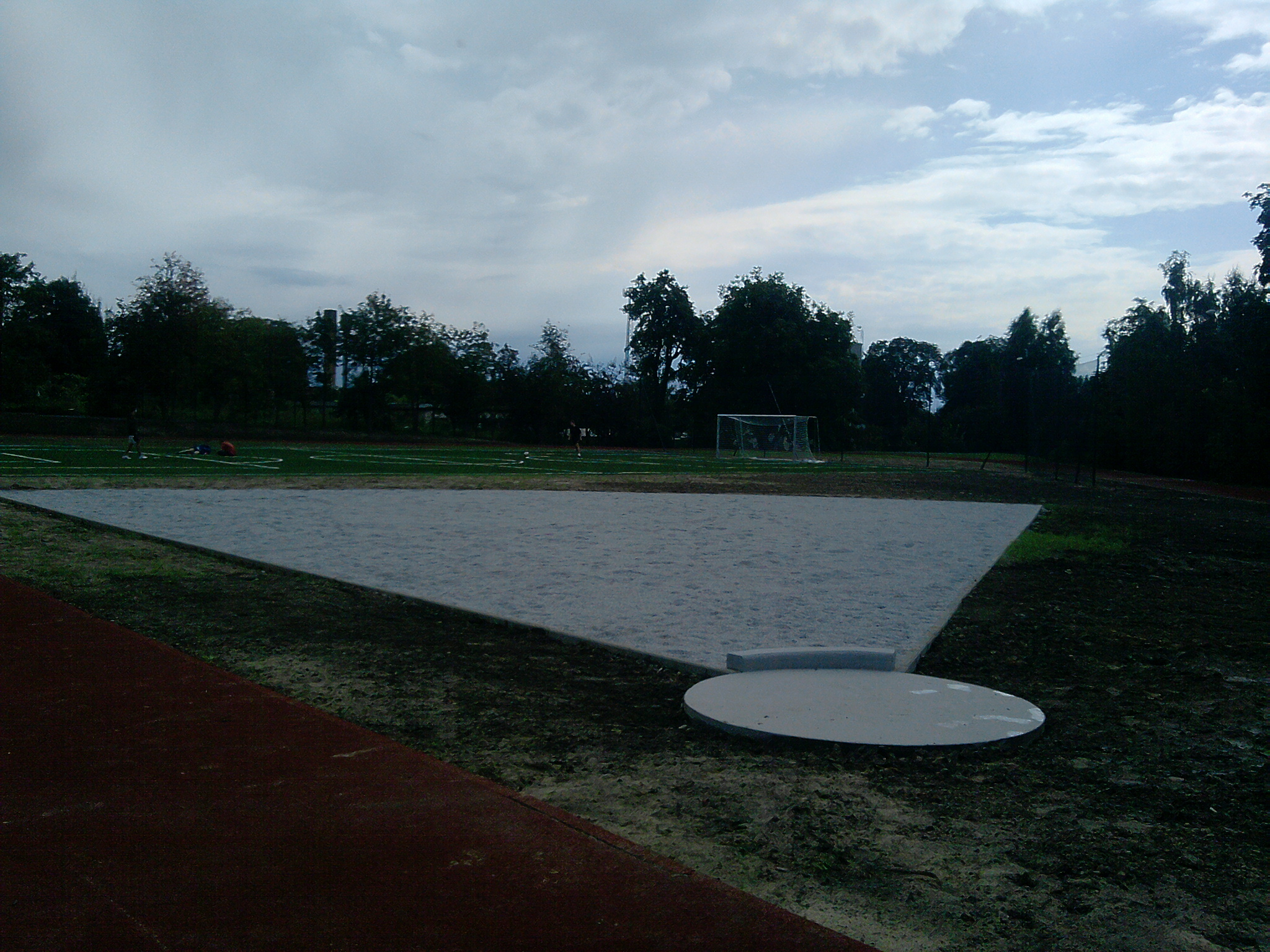
Sports complex at the School Complex in Kowalów

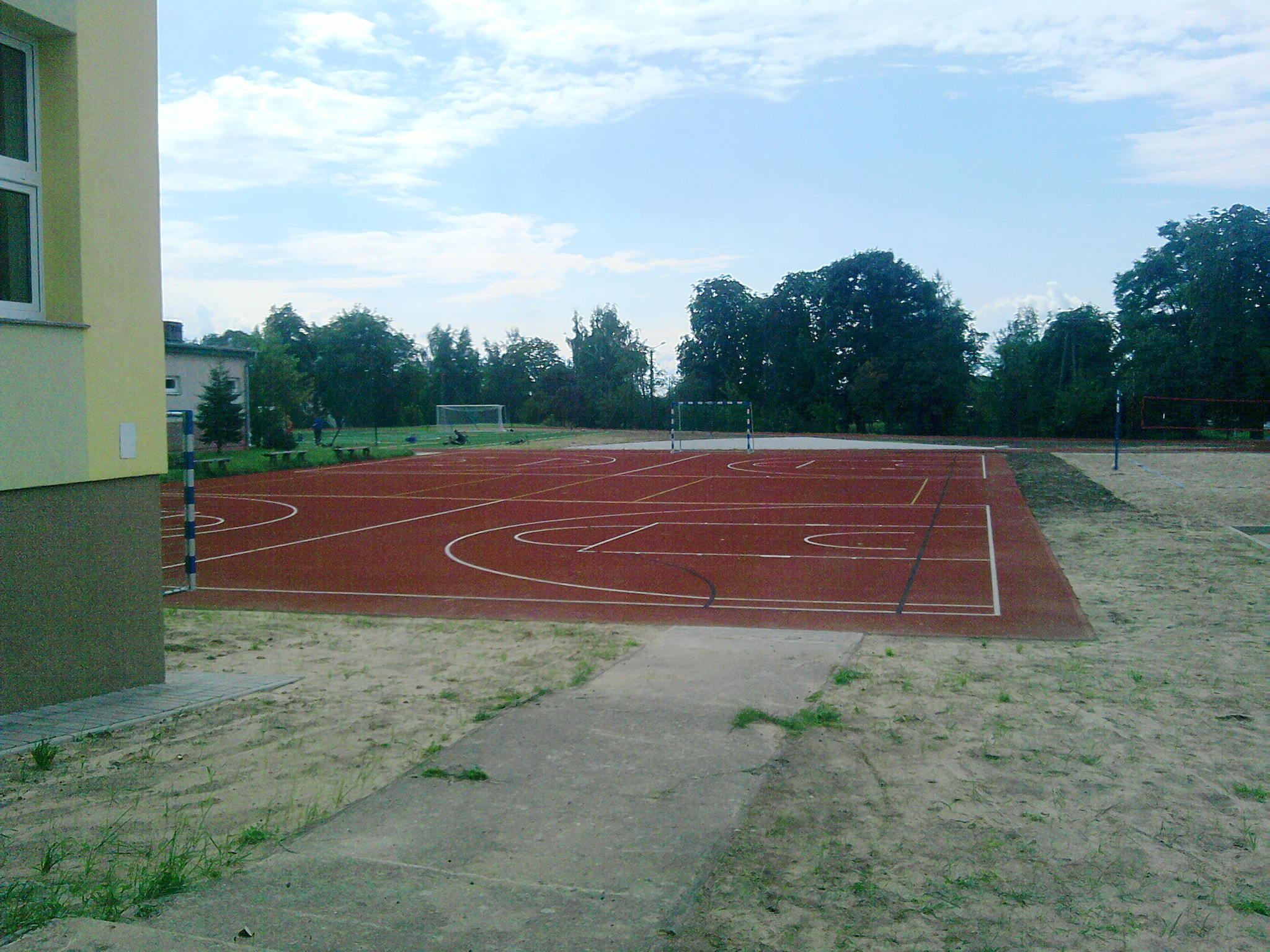
Basketball court at the Complex of Schools in Kowalów

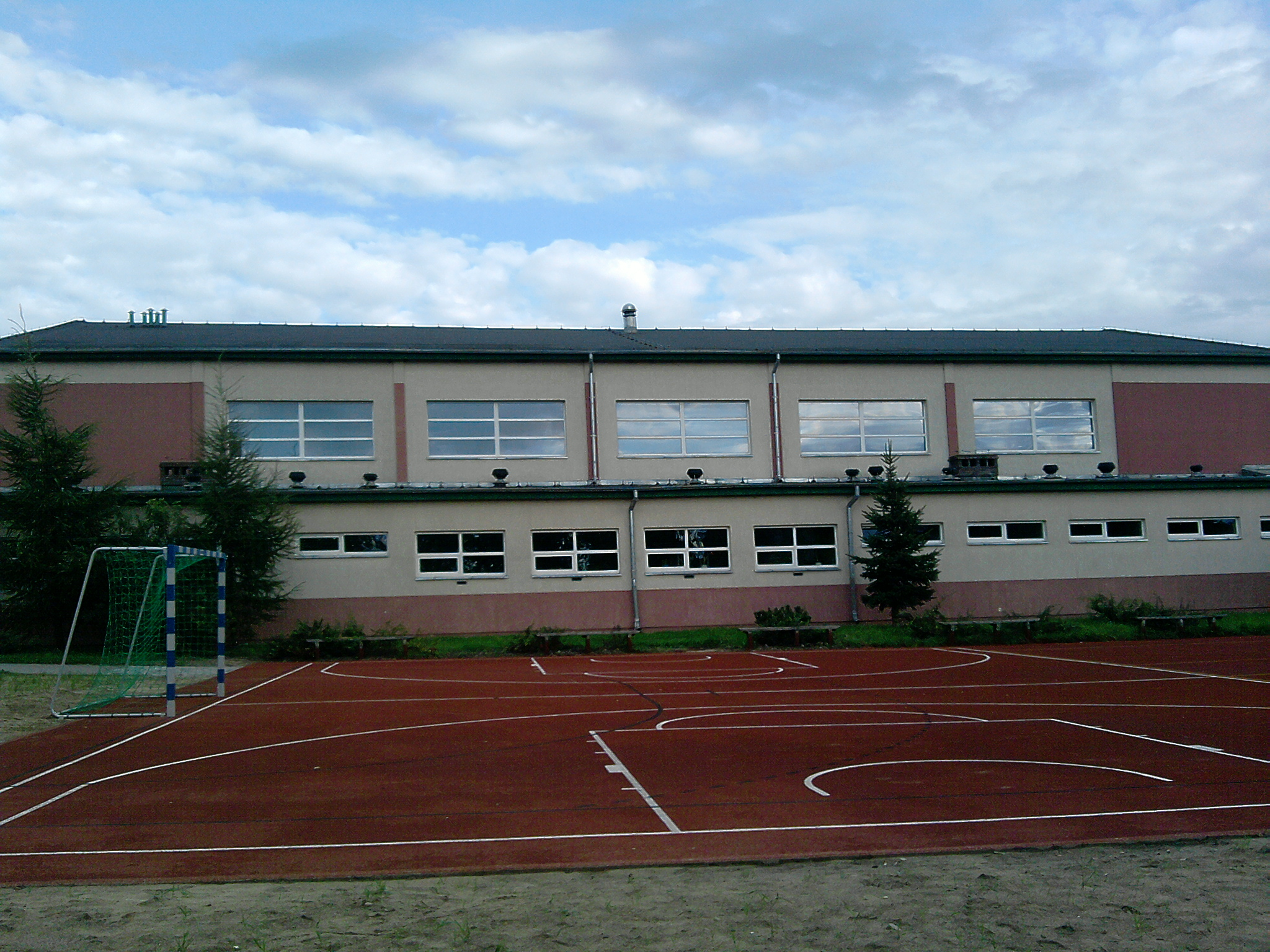
Athletic Hall of Kowalów

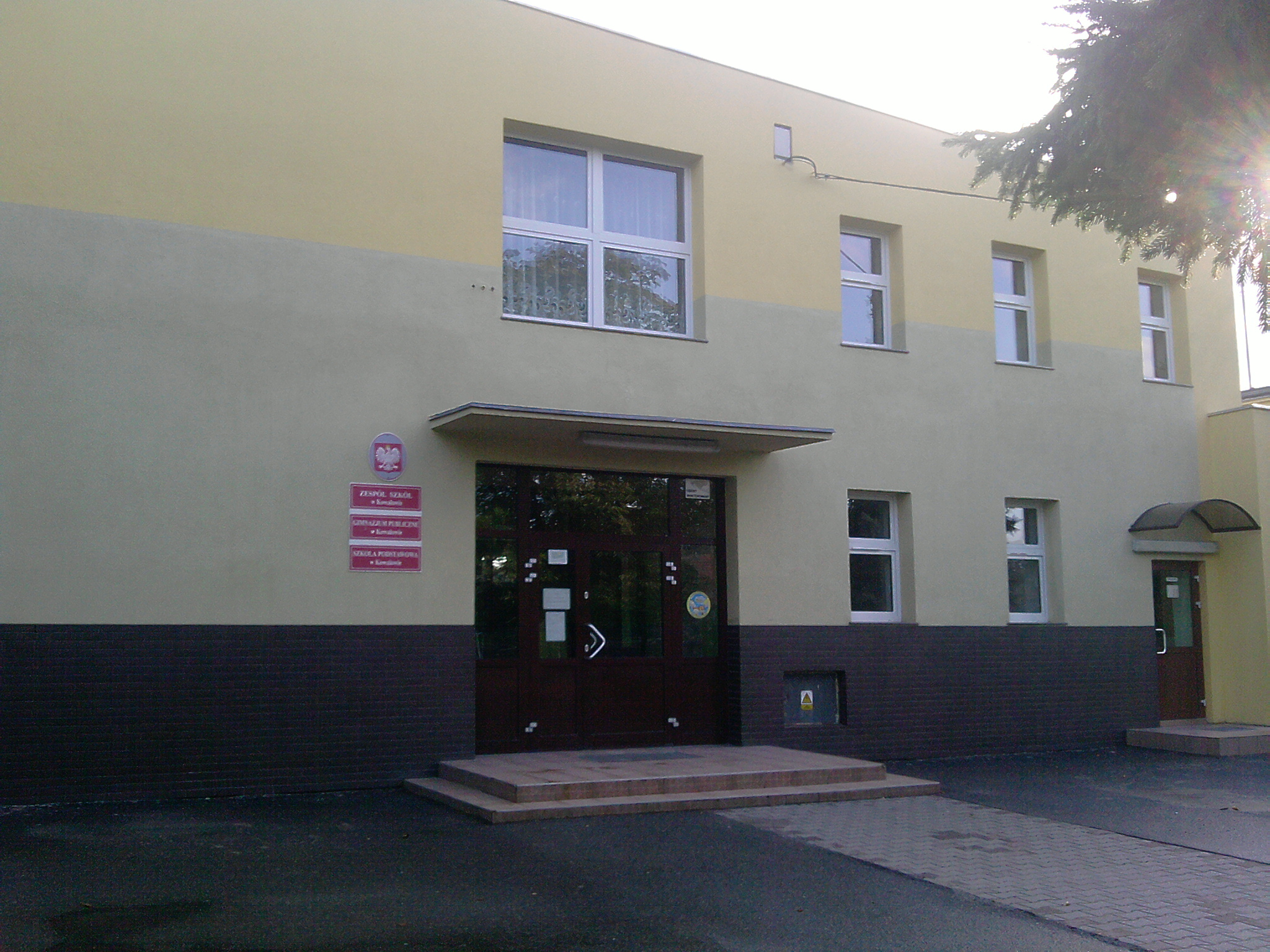
Access to Secondary School in Kowalów
