= Starościn, Lubusz Voivodeship =

Starościn
- Village
- Location within Poland
- Coordinates: 52°22′N 14°51′E
- Country: Poland
- Voivodeship: Lubusz
- County: Słubice
- Gmina: Rzepin
- Population: 300

Starościn [staˈrɔɕt͡ɕin] is a village in the administrative district of Gmina Rzepin, within Słubice County, Lubusz Voivodeship, in western Poland.
