= Radów =

- Village
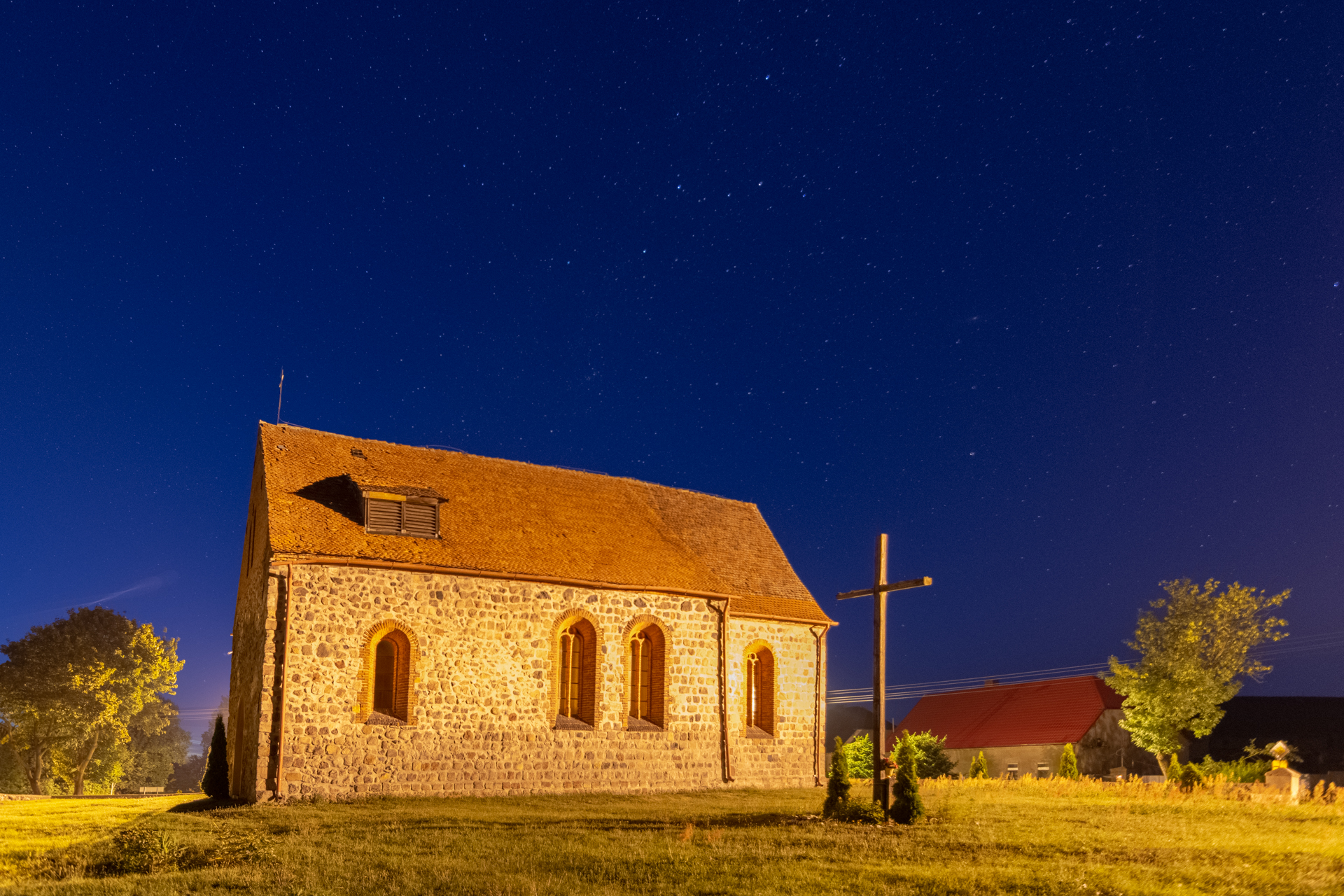

- Location within Poland
- Coordinates: 52°26′N 14°45′E
- Country: Poland
- Voivodeship: Lubusz
- County: Słubice
- Gmina: Rzepin

Population
  - Total: 280

Radów [ˈraduf] is a village in the administrative district of Gmina Rzepin, within Słubice County, Lubusz Voivodeship, in western Poland.
