= Starków, Lubusz Voivodeship =

Starków
- Village
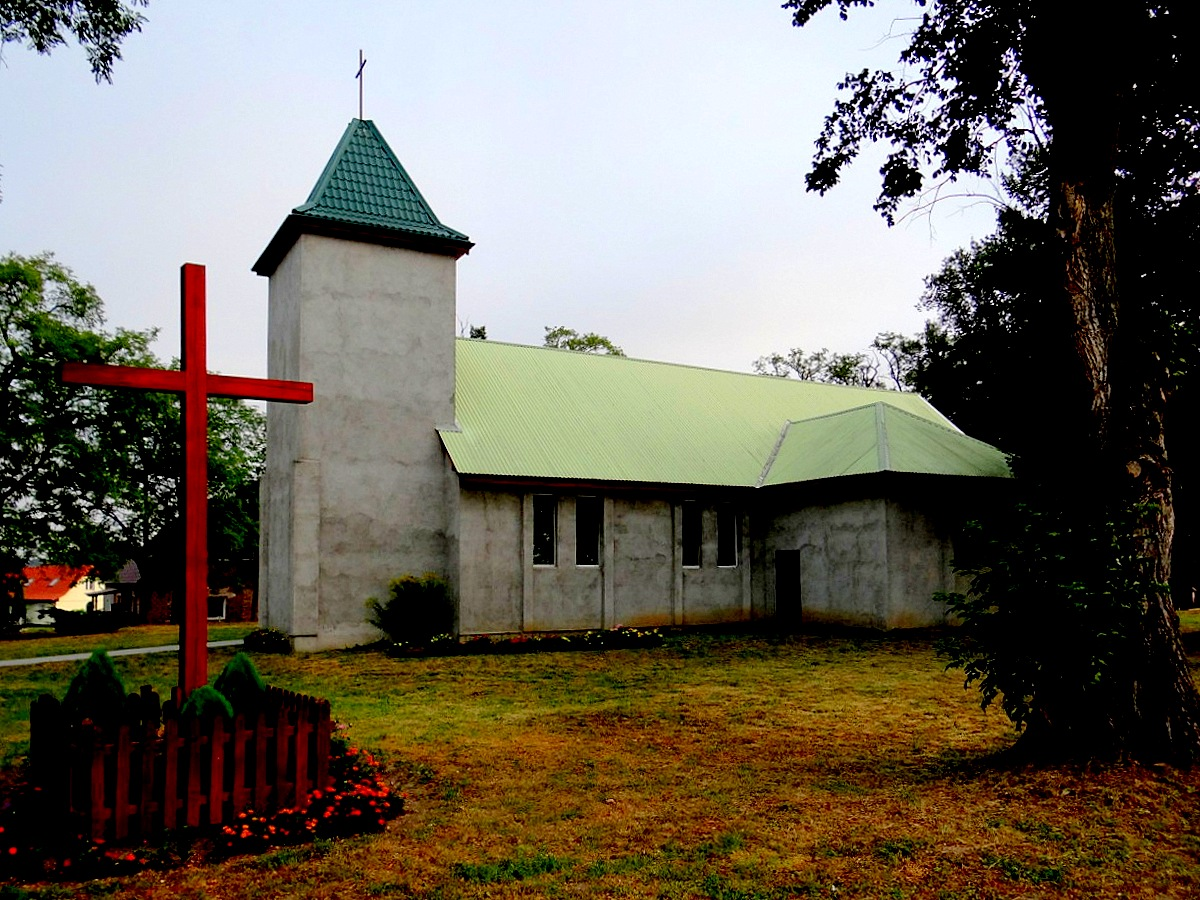
- Catholic church

- Location within Poland
- Coordinates: 52°24′N 14°42′E
- Country: Poland
- Voivodeship: Lubusz
- County: Słubice
- Gmina: Rzepin
- Population: 160

Starków [ˈstarkuf] is a village in the administrative district of Gmina Rzepin, within Słubice County, Lubusz Voivodeship, in western Poland.
