= Gajec, Poland =

Gajec
- Village
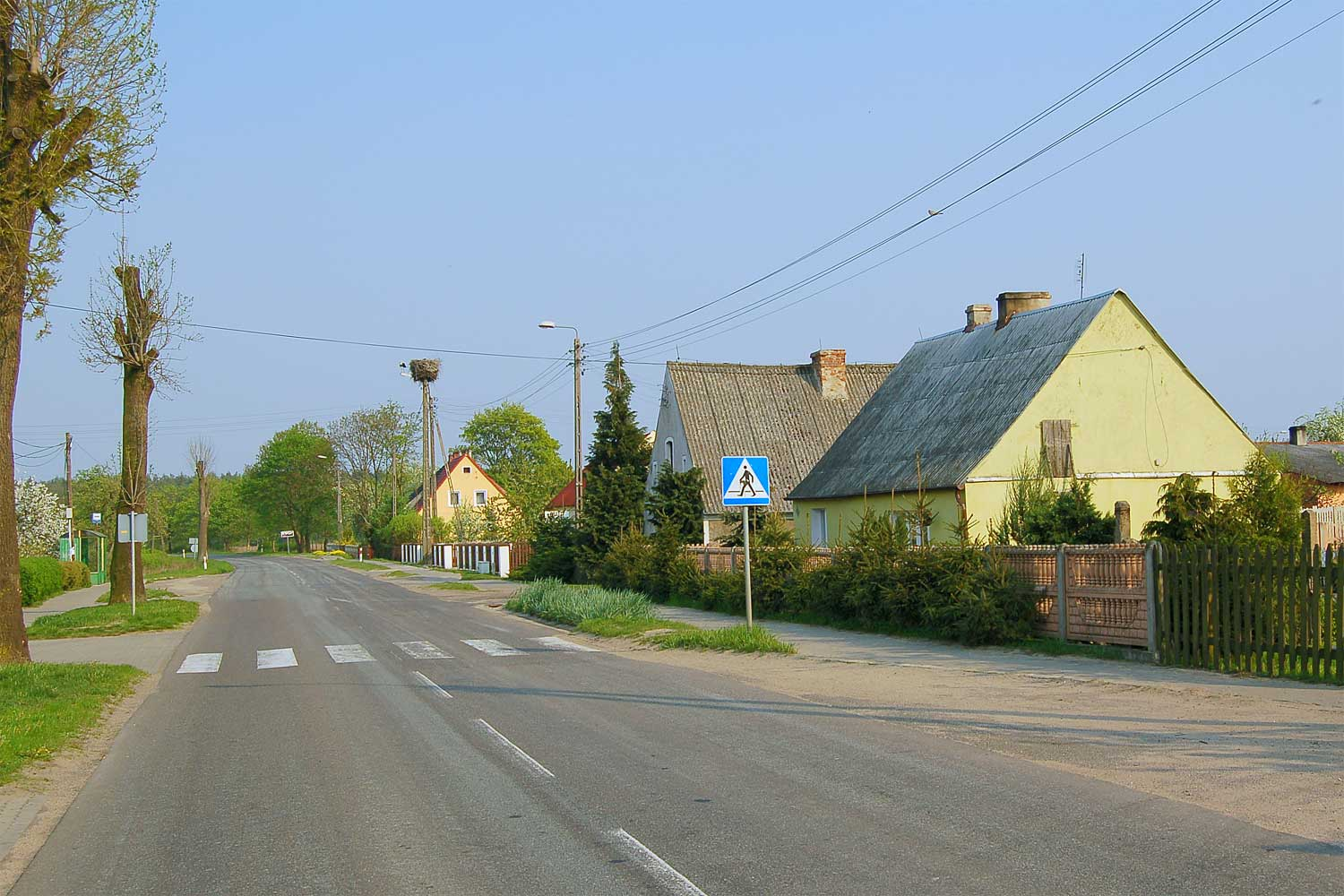

- Location within Poland
- Coordinates: 52°20′N 14°46′E
- Country: Poland
- Voivodeship: Lubusz
- County: Słubice
- Gmina: Rzepin
- Population: 300
- Website: http://gajec.pl

Gajec [ˈɡajɛt͡s] is a village in the administrative district of Gmina Rzepin, within Słubice County, Lubusz Voivodeship, in western Poland.
