= Zielona Góra =

City in Lubusz Voivodeship, Poland

- City county
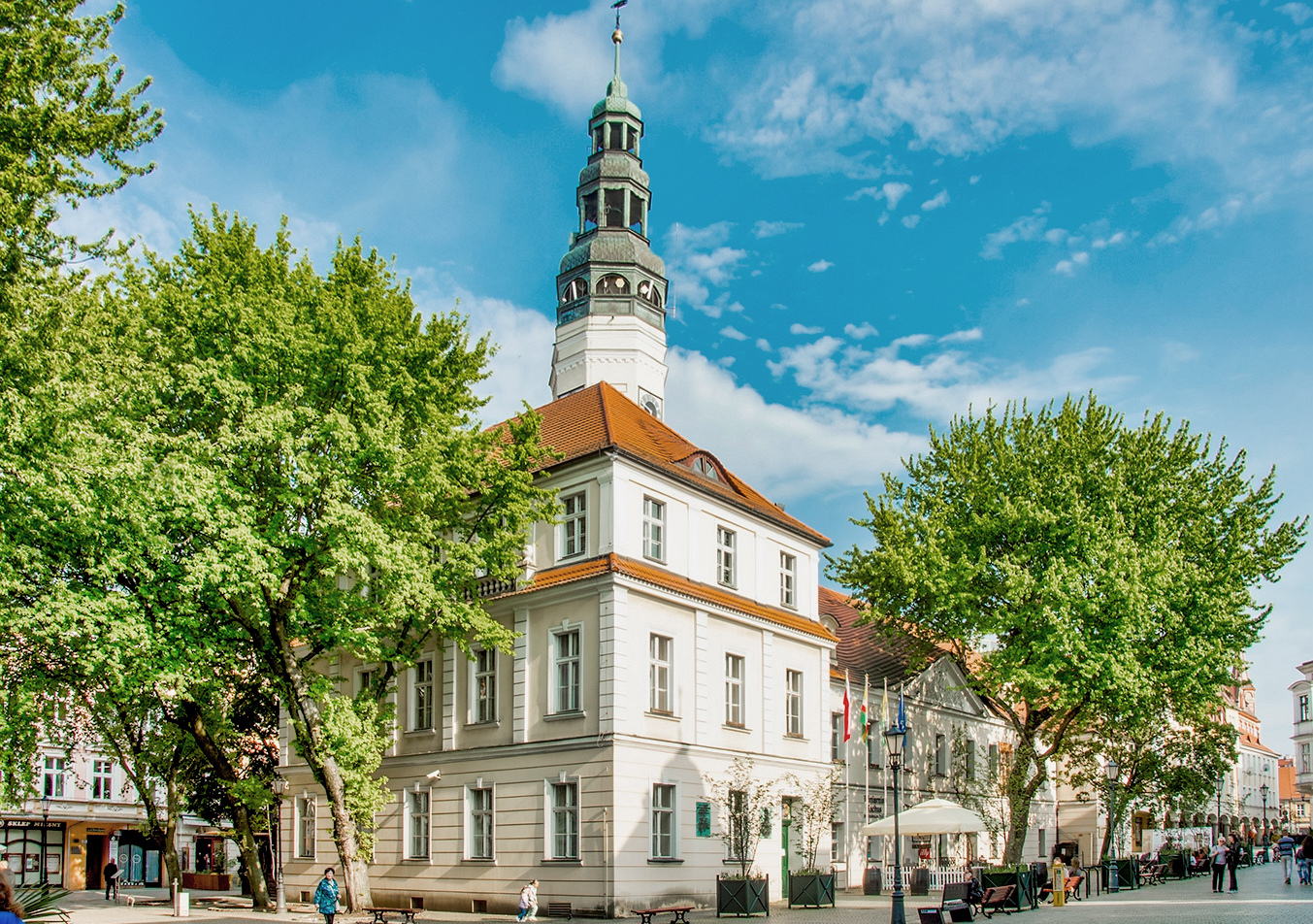
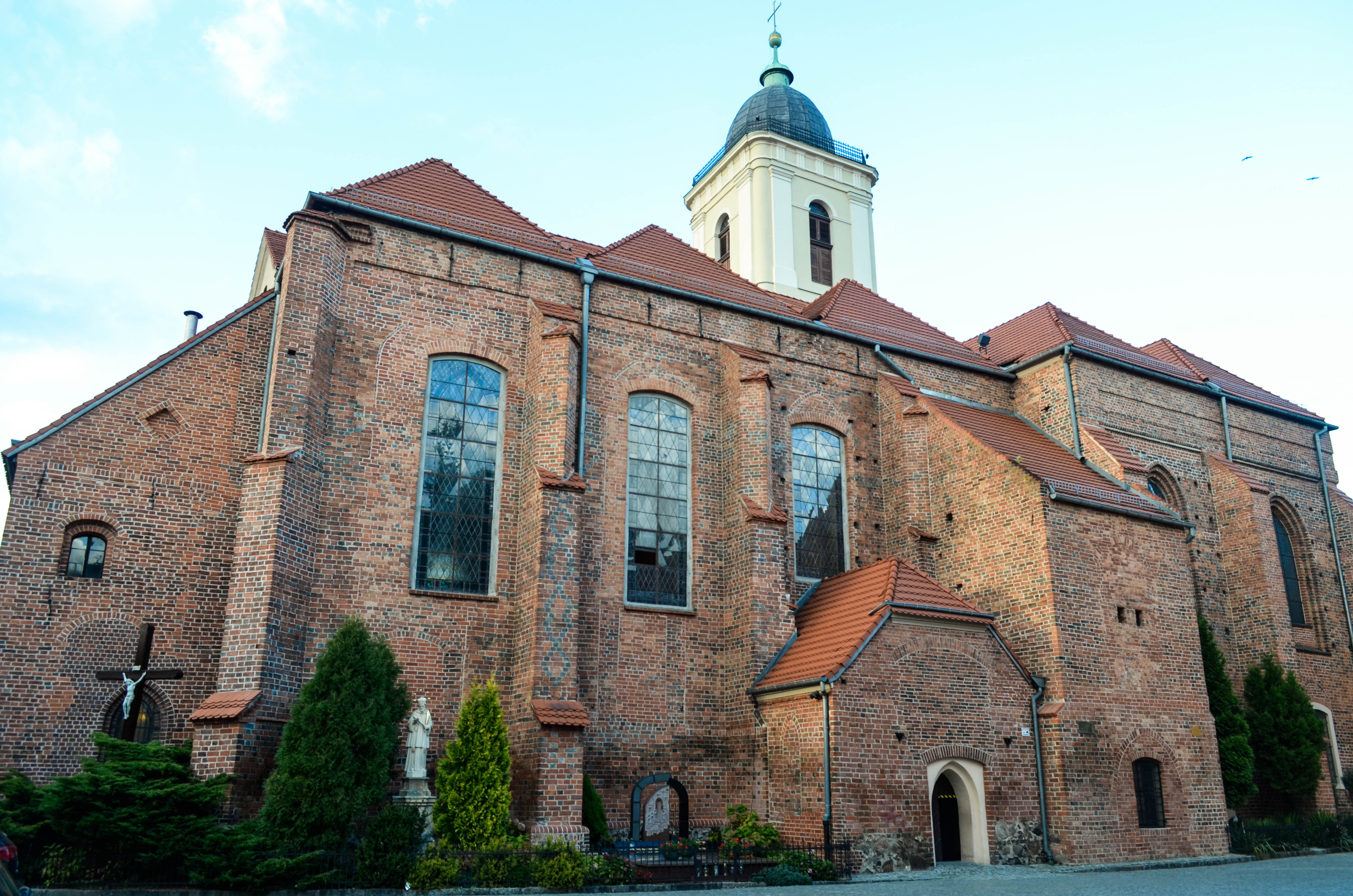
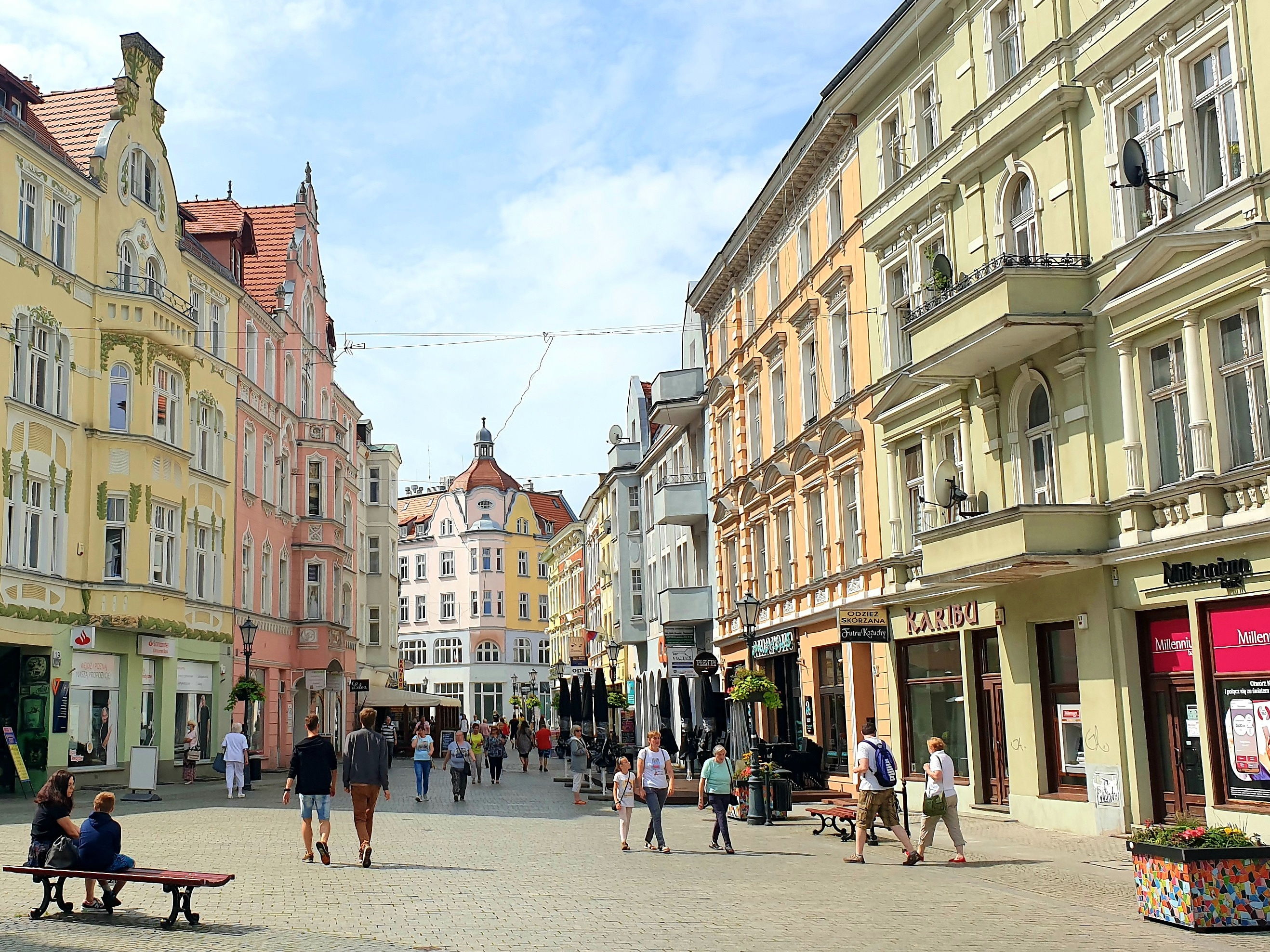
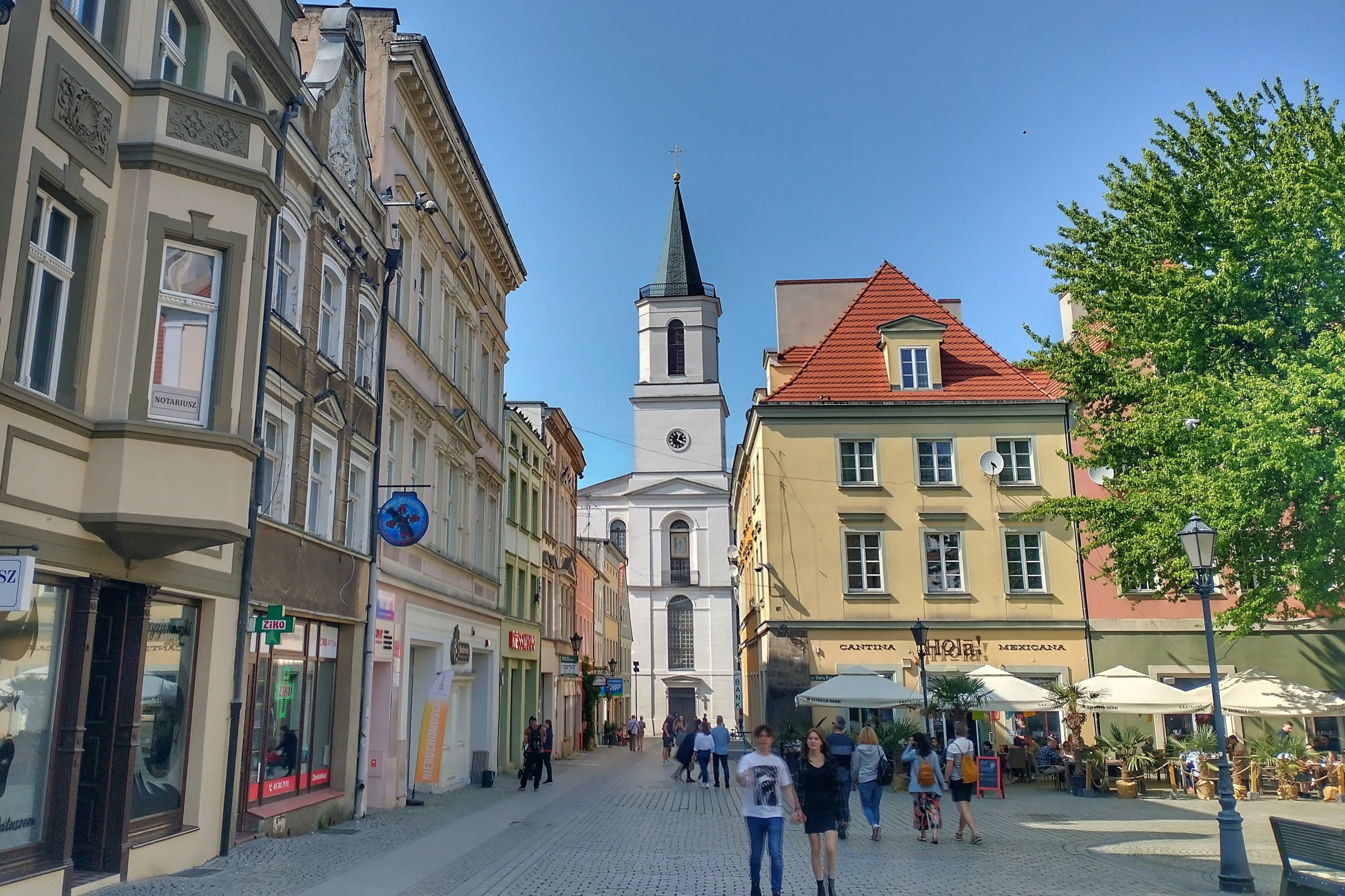
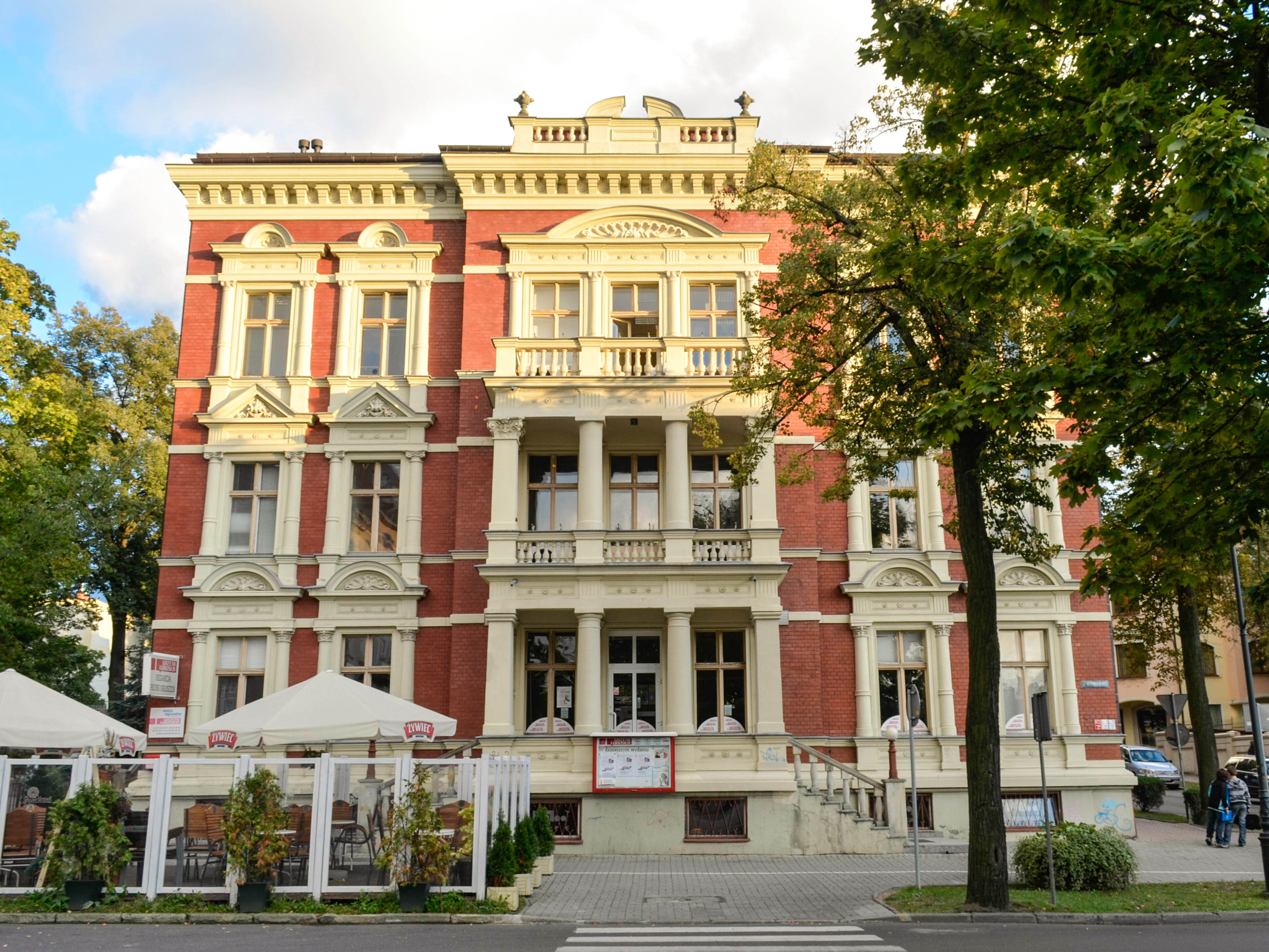
- Town Hall Co-Cathedral Żeromskiego Street Old Town Market Square Independence Avenue villa

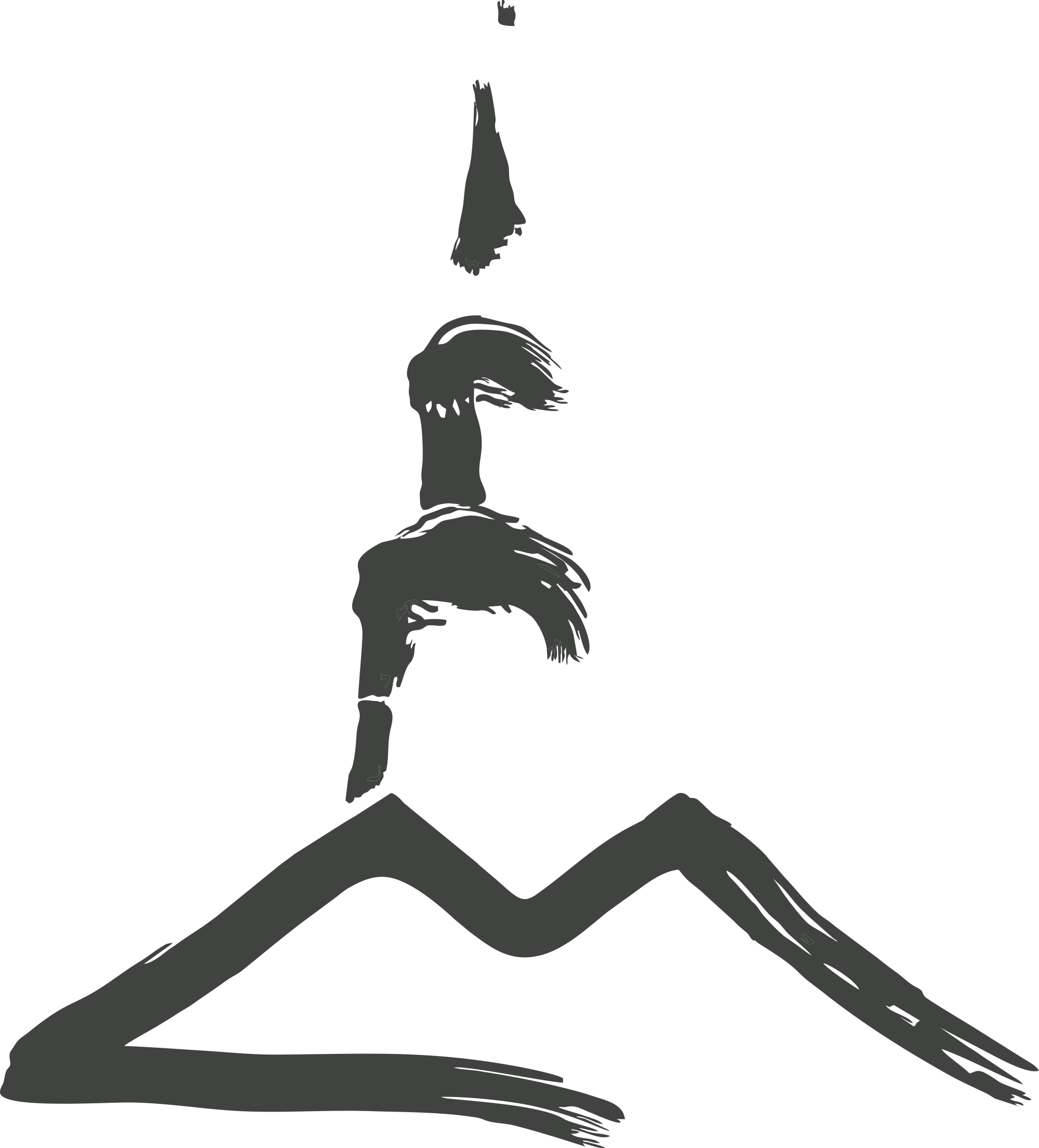
- Flag Coat of arms Brandmark
- Motto: Miasto przyszłości City of the future
- Location within Poland
- Coordinates: 51°56′N 15°30′E
- Country: Poland
- Voivodeship: Lubusz
- County: city county
- Established: 13th century
- Town rights: 1323

Government
  - Mayor: Marcin Pabierowski (KO)

Area
  - City county: 278.32 km^{2} (107.46 sq mi)
- Elevation: 71 m (233 ft)

Population (31 December 2021)
  - City county: 140,403 ▼ (24th)
  - Density: 510/km^{2} (1,300/sq mi)
  - Urban: 216,781
- Demonym(s): zielonogórzanin (male) zielonogórzanka (female) (pl)
- Time zone: UTC+1 (CET)
  - Summer (DST): UTC+2 (CEST)
- Postal code: 65-001 to 65-950
- Area code: +48 68
- Car plates: FZ/FZI
- Climate: Cfb
- GDP: 2017
  - Total: Nominal: €10 billion PPP: $14 billion
  - Per capita: Nominal: €17,300; PPP: $20,900
- Primary airport: Zielona Góra Airport
- Website: www.zielona-gora.pl

Zielona Góra (Polish: [ʑɛˈlɔna ˈɡura]; lit. 'Green Mountain'; German: Grünberg in Schlesien) is the largest city in Lubusz Voivodeship, located in western Poland, with 140,403 inhabitants (2021). The region is closely associated with vineyards and holds an annual Wine Fest. Zielona Góra is one of the two capital cities of Lubusz Voivodeship, hosting the province's elected assembly, while the seat of the centrally appointed governor is in the city of Gorzów Wielkopolski.

In 1222 Duke Henry the Bearded from the Piast dynasty brought the first settlers to the area. In 1323 Zielona Góra was granted town privileges. The town was incorporated into the Kingdom of Bohemia in 1506 and became part of the Habsburg Empire in 1526. It experienced a wave of witch trials in the 17th century. As a result of the First Silesian War, the city became part of the Kingdom of Prussia in 1742. It then was part of the North German Confederation and the German Reich until the end of World War II in 1945, when it became part of Poland.

== Toponymy ==
In the Silesian language, the city is called Źelůno Gůra (in Steuer's Silesian alphabet) or Grinberg; using the Silesian primer alphabet: Zielōnŏ Gōra or Grinberg; in Silesian German, the city was called Grienberg.

In the 16th century, pseudo-historical Latin names appeared for the city, such as Prasia Elysiorum and Thalloris.

== History ==
=== Middle Ages ===
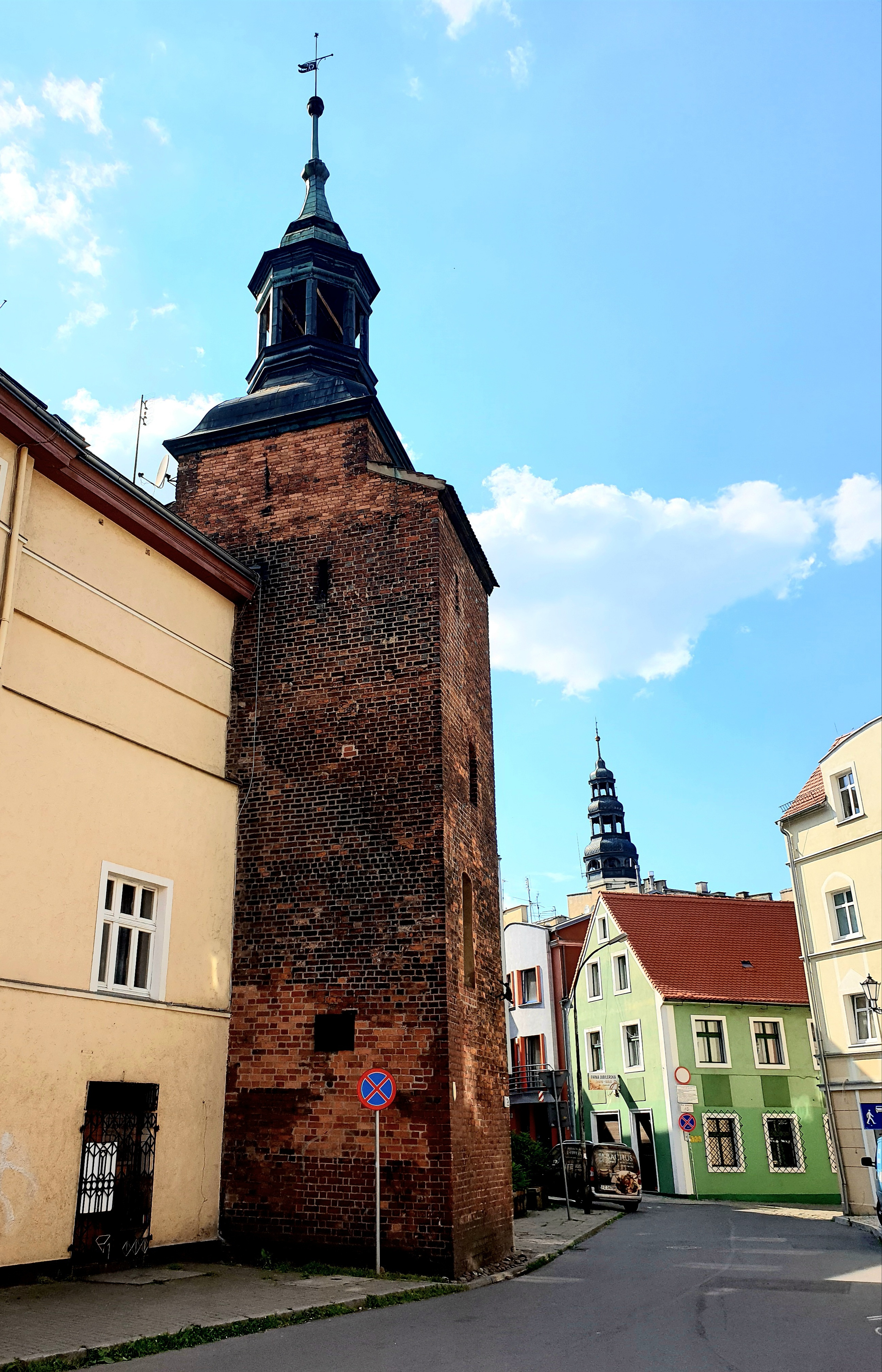
Medieval Łazienna Gate

The first settlement in the area of Zielona Góra was built in the valley near the Złota Łącza stream during the reign of the Polish ruler Mieszko I. The oldest settlement was agricultural. It later developed into a trading point along routes from Poznań to Żagań and further to Lusatia. The written records of the Slavic settlement date to 1222 and an increase of its population by Henry the Bearded. Other documents date the settlement to 1302.

The region received an influx of German burghers in the second half of the 13th century during the medieval Ostsiedlung. In 1323, the settlement became a city with Crossener Recht, a variation of Magdeburg rights. The earliest mention of the town's coat of arms is from 1421, although it is believed to have been arranged since the beginning of the 14th century. A document in the town archive of Thorn (Toruń) dating from before 1400 used a sigil with the name GRVNINBERG, an early form of the German name Grünberg.

In 1294, Duke Henryk III of the Duchy of Głogów, founded a church in honour of Saint Hedwig, the High Duchess consort of Poland and patron saint of Silesia. Now designated a co-cathedral, it is the oldest building in the city. A wooden castle near the city, built ca. 1272, was the residence of Duke John of Ścinawa from 1358 to 1365. Janusz had ceded his lands to Duke Henry V of Iron. In 1477 the town defeated a 5,000-strong army from neighbouring Brandenburg which attempted to seize it during the succession war to the Duchy of Głogów. In 1488, Duke John II of Żagań, destroyed the castle to prevent his enemies from using it.

The deposition of Duke John II of Żagań in 1488 marked the end of the long rule of the Piast dynasty in the Duchy of Głogów and the city of Zielona Góra. Later on, the duchy was ruled by the future Kings of Poland John I Albert and Sigismund I the Old. It was integrated with the Kingdom of Bohemia in 1506, although Polish king Sigismund I the Old still claimed his rights to the city in 1508.

=== Early modern period ===
The city flourished during the reign of Sigismund I the Old. In 1505 Sigismund issued a privilege allowing the sale of cloth products from Zielona Góra throughout Poland. In 1641, King Władysław IV Vasa of Poland confirmed these rights. Another important branch of the city's economy at this time was winemaking.

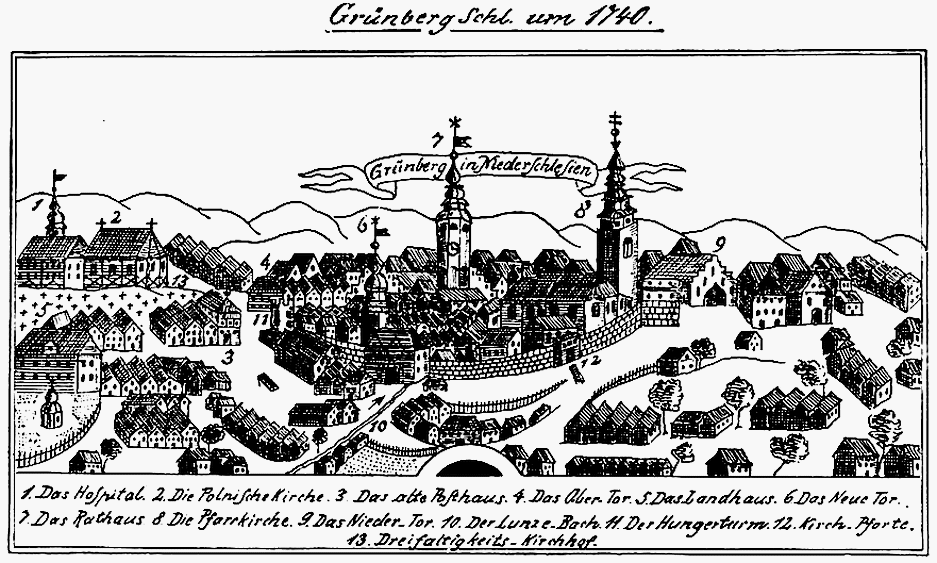
A panorama of the city in the mid-18th century

The city converted to Lutheranism during the Protestant Reformation through the efforts of Paul Lemberg, Abbot of Sagan. The city declined during the 17th century, especially during the Thirty Years' War (1618–1648) and following decades. Grünberg endured plundering, debts, emigration of burghers, and fires. In 1651 during the Counter Reformation, the Habsburg monarchy of Austria reintroduced Roman Catholicism and suppressed Protestantism.

The city was subjected to heavy Germanisation and German craftsmen banned Poles from attending any practice allowing them to work as members of guilds. A rebellion caused by conscription ended with many Poles being imprisoned. From 1640, witch trials took place, the number of which increased significantly in 1663–1665. As a result, in 1669 the local court was deprived of the right to impose the death penalty on women accused of witchcraft.

The city was incorporated into the Kingdom of Prussia by the 1742 Treaty of Breslau which ended the First Silesian War. The Prussians introduced religious toleration, leading to the construction of the Protestant parish church Zum Garten Christ from 1746 to 1747. Catholic Poles were later discriminated against, however. In 1758, during the Seven Years' War, POWs brought the plague to the city.

=== Late modern period ===
The city's textile industry was booming by the end of the 1700s. By 1800, large parts of the city walls had been dismantled to allow the city to expand. The textile industry suffered during the 1820s while adjusting to the Industrial Revolution and an import ban by the Russian Empire. The city's economy began to recover after many clothiers emigrated to Congress Poland. English industrialists were among the 19th-century economic reformers of Grünberg.

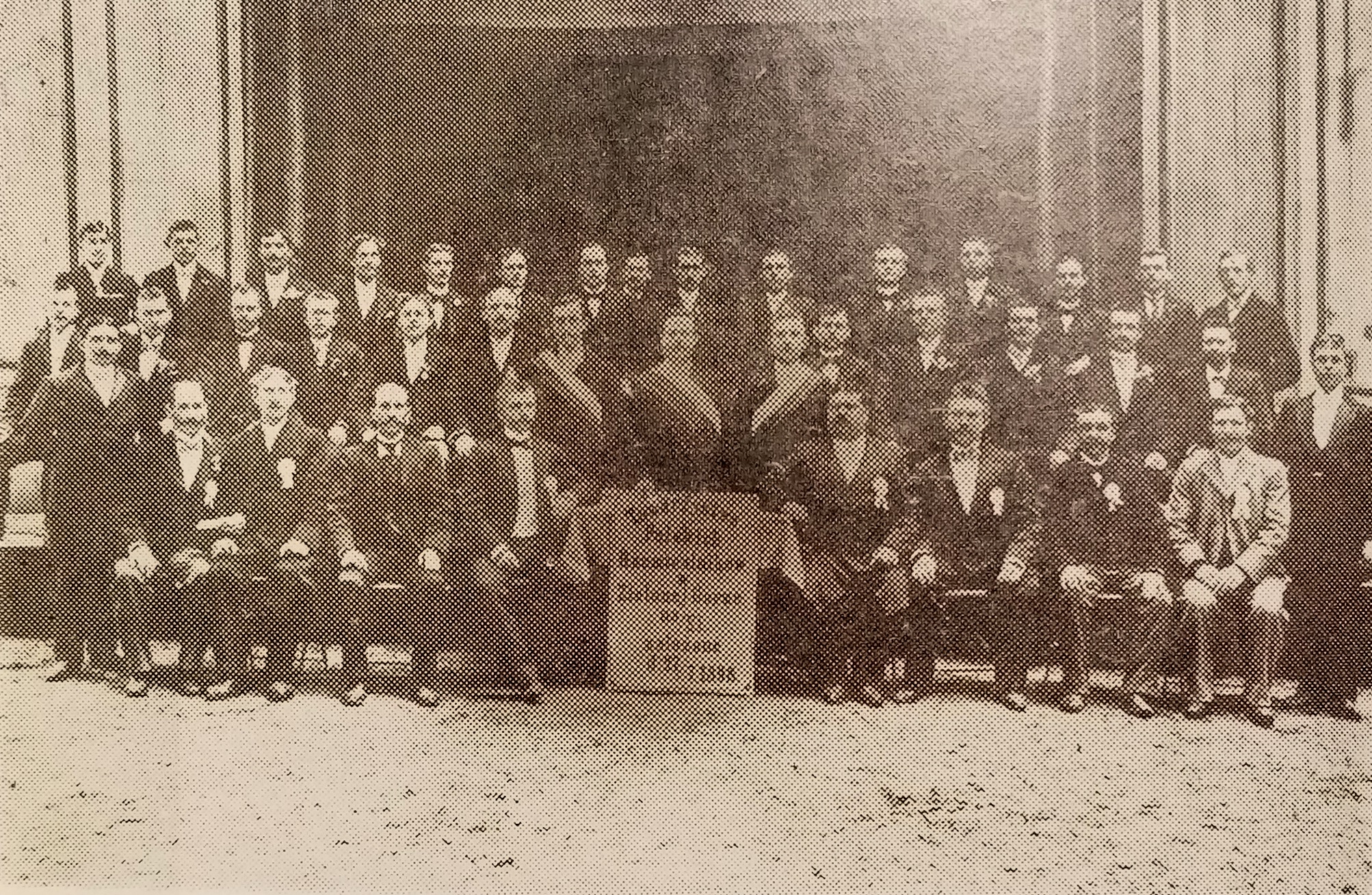
Polish Craftsmen Association

During industrialisation, many Germans from the countryside moved to large industrial cities and a large number of Poles came to German cities to work as well. The Polish population was pushed by Germanisation to rural villages, although some remained in the town contributed to the economic revival of the city. A Polish church remained functional until 1809 and the Polish Craftsmen Association (Towarzystwo Polskich Rzemieślników) was established by Kazimierz Lisowski in 1898; it existed till 1935 when Lisowski was murdered by the Gestapo. In 1923 a branch of the Union of Poles in Germany was established. In 1932 the German authorities did not allow the establishment of a Polish school.

Since 1816 after the Napoleonic Wars, Grünberg was administered within the district Landkreis Grünberg in the Province of Silesia. In 1871 it became part of the German Empire during the unification of Germany. English industrialists purchased some of the city's textile factories during the 1870s and 1880s. By 1885, most of Grünberg's population of 14,396 were Protestants. The city was first connected to the Glogau (Głogów)-Grünberg-Guben railway line in 1871, followed by connections to Christianstadt (Nowogród Bobrzański) in 1904, Wollstein (Wolsztyn) in 1905, and a local line to Sprottau (Szprotawa) in 1911. In 1919, Grünberg became part of the Province of Lower Silesia within Weimar Germany. On 1 April 1922 it became a district-free city. This status was revoked on 1 October 1933 while part of Nazi Germany. During the Kristallnacht in 1938, the Germans destroyed the synagogue.

=== World War II ===
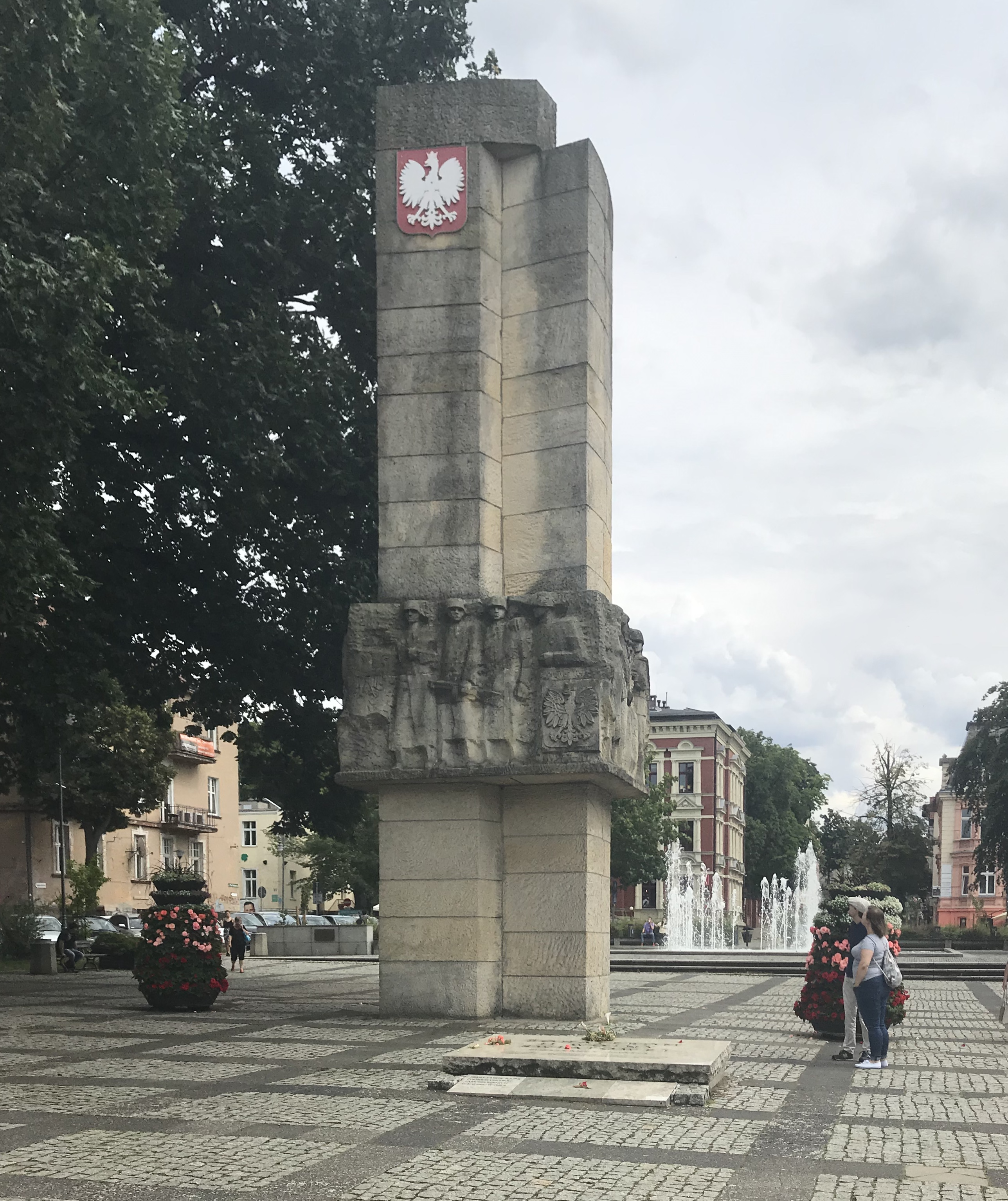
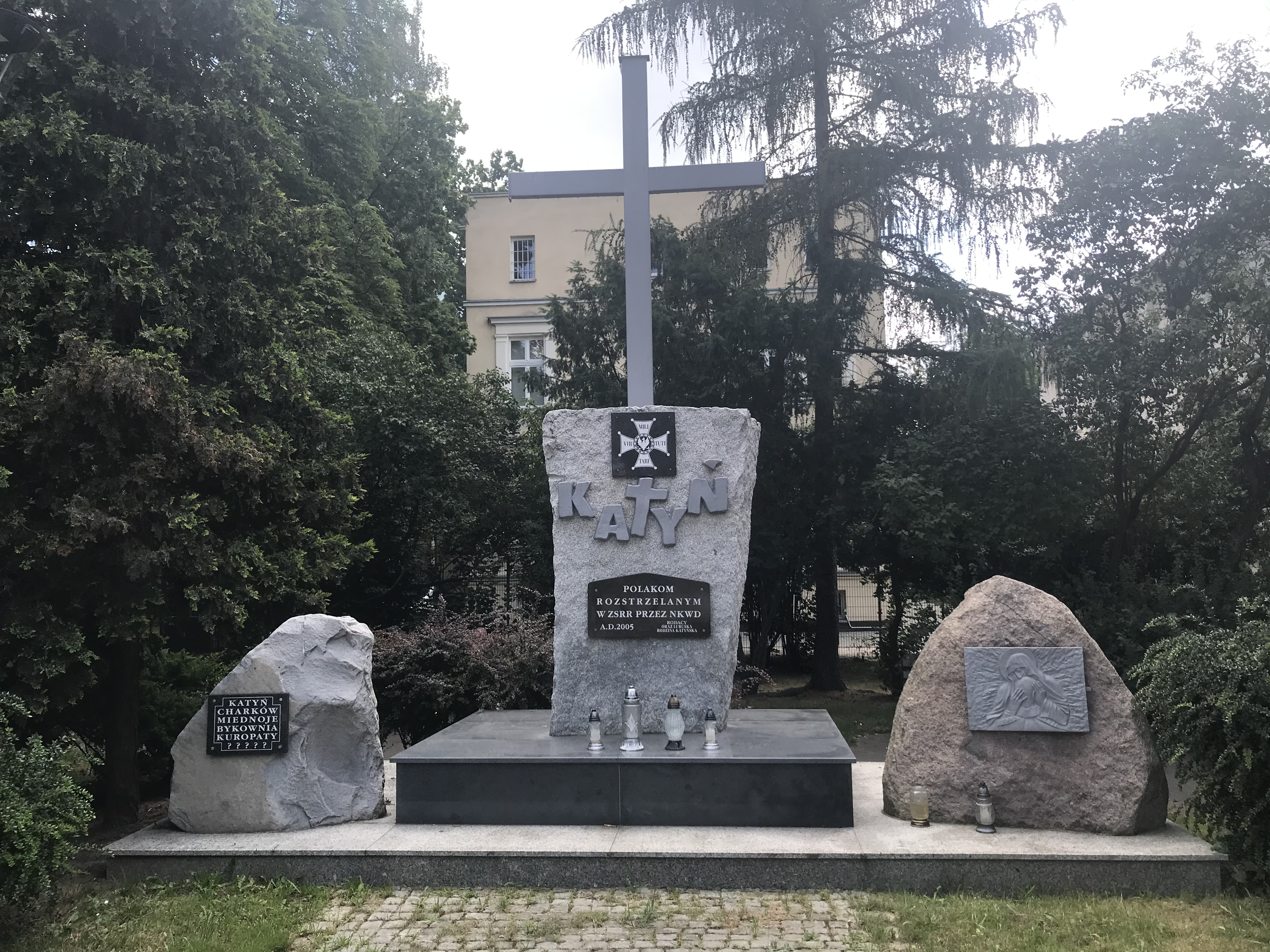
Memorials to the heroes of World War II and victims of the Katyn massacre

During World War II the German Nazi government operated 42 forced labour camps in armaments production in the city, intended initially for Polish men and women, and later also Russians, Ukrainians, Britons, French and Italians. There were also three subcamps of the Gross-Rosen concentration camp within the modern city limits for Jewish men and women. In January 1945, a German-perpetrated death march of Jewish women from Sława reached the city, and the remaining prisoners were also sent on death marches westwards.

On 11 February 1945, the authorities of Grünberg received a report about Russians in the vicinity of Neusalz. Wehrmacht soldiers and civilians organizing defense in cities were threatened with being cut off from the south-west. In this situation, the preparations of Grünberg for defense by regular troops were interrupted. On 11 February the Yalta Conference ended and it was not known exactly what would happen to Grünberg. On 12 February the most important German offices and management boards of larger enterprises were evacuated beyond the Lusatian Neisse.

On 13 February other residents were encouraged to leave the city through megaphones. The last train left in the evening. One of the previously sent transports was hit by an English air attack in Dresden and, according to some, about 900 inhabitants of Grünberg died at the local railway station. On 14 February. Hitler's ardent supporters called on the Hitler Youth to defend themselves. Previously, the so-called Sonderkommando, which from the morning started blowing up strategic objects and immobilizing various technical devices, e.g. power plants, gas plants and waterworks.

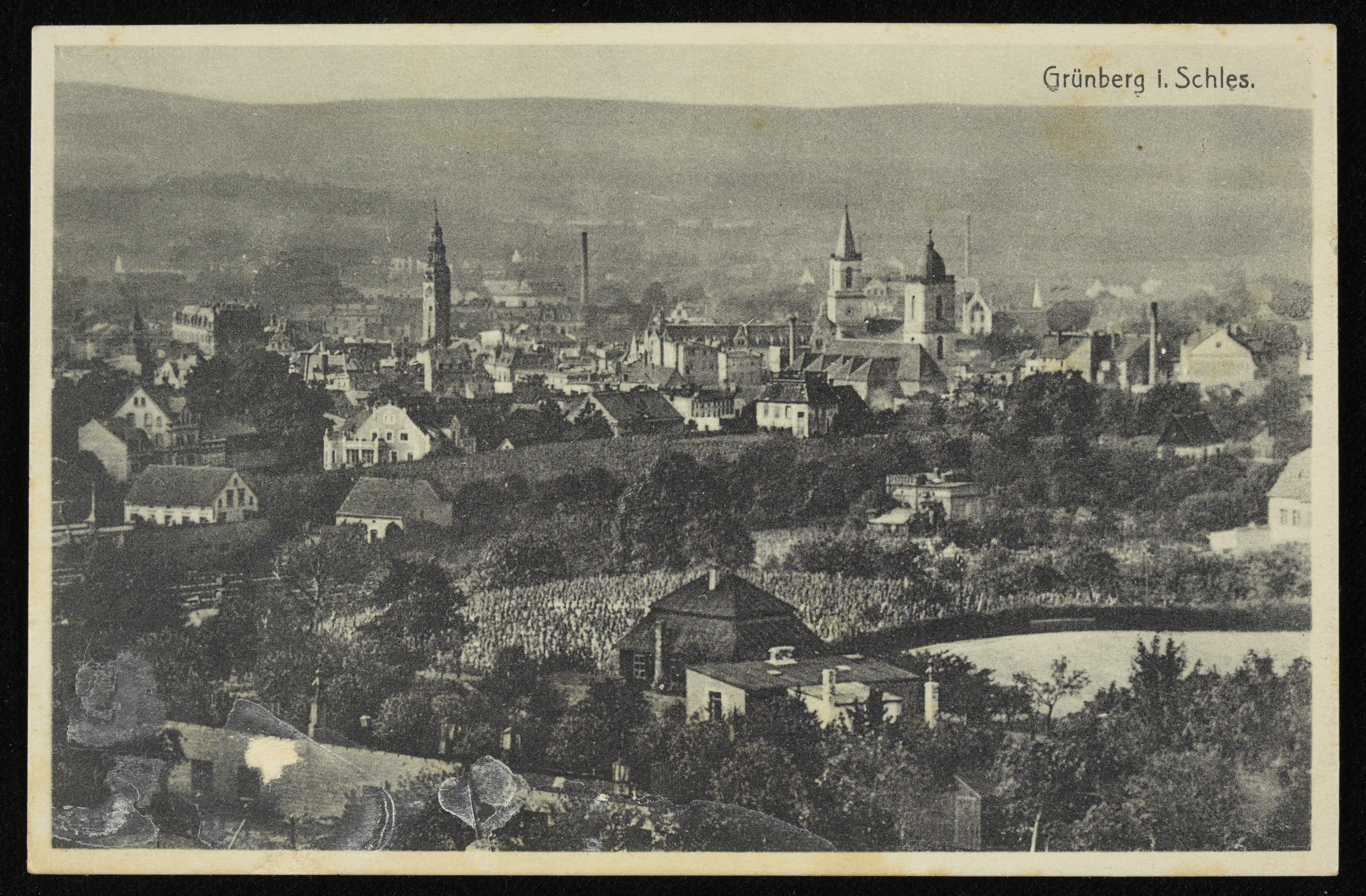
Panorama before 1945

The defenders set up two machine guns on the Branibor Hill. Having heard about the imminent threat from Neusalz, they withdrew to the city center. On the other hand, the supporters of a quick surrender, including the worker Alfred Kuntzel, the Nazi Friedrich Brucks and the communist Karl Laube formed a surrender committee. The Soviet Red Army occupied Grünberg with little fighting on 14 February 1945, during World War II.

The Red Army headed by the Third Army began artillery fire at 13:00 from cannons positioned on the hills south of Lawaldau (Racula). After reaching the northern border of this village, the reconnaissance units moved towards the city. Some of them, following an arc, ended up in Lawaldau, others in Altkessel (Stary Kisielin) and even in Jany, and still others took over Heinersdorf (Jędrzychów). The main unit entered the city along Breslauerstraße (today Wrocławska Street). Soon, small groups of Red Army soldiers began to appear from the side of Freystädter Chaussee (Kożuchowska Street). The 3rd Army established their headquarters in the Poviat Office building.

In that period, about 500 people committed suicide. The following month, according to the post-war Potsdam Agreement, the town was placed under Polish administration under territorial compensation for the territories of former Eastern Poland annexed by the Soviet Union. The remaining German inhabitants who had not fled their homes from the Eastern Front were expelled in accordance with the Potsdam Agreement.

The town was partly resettled with Poles transferred from Polish areas annexed by the Soviet Union. The city was briefly renamed Zielonogóra in 1945, before the Commission for the Determination of Place Names officially adopted Zielona Góra, a name first attested in a Polish-language schoolbook published in 1847. The 18th-century Protestant church was reconsecrated as a Catholic church (Kościół Matki Boskiej Częstochowskiej). The city's first post-war mayor was Tomasz Sobkowiak, a former prisoner of the Auschwitz concentration camp during the German occupation of Poland. He is remembered as an efficient administrator, with a friendly attitude towards Germans.

=== Recent history ===
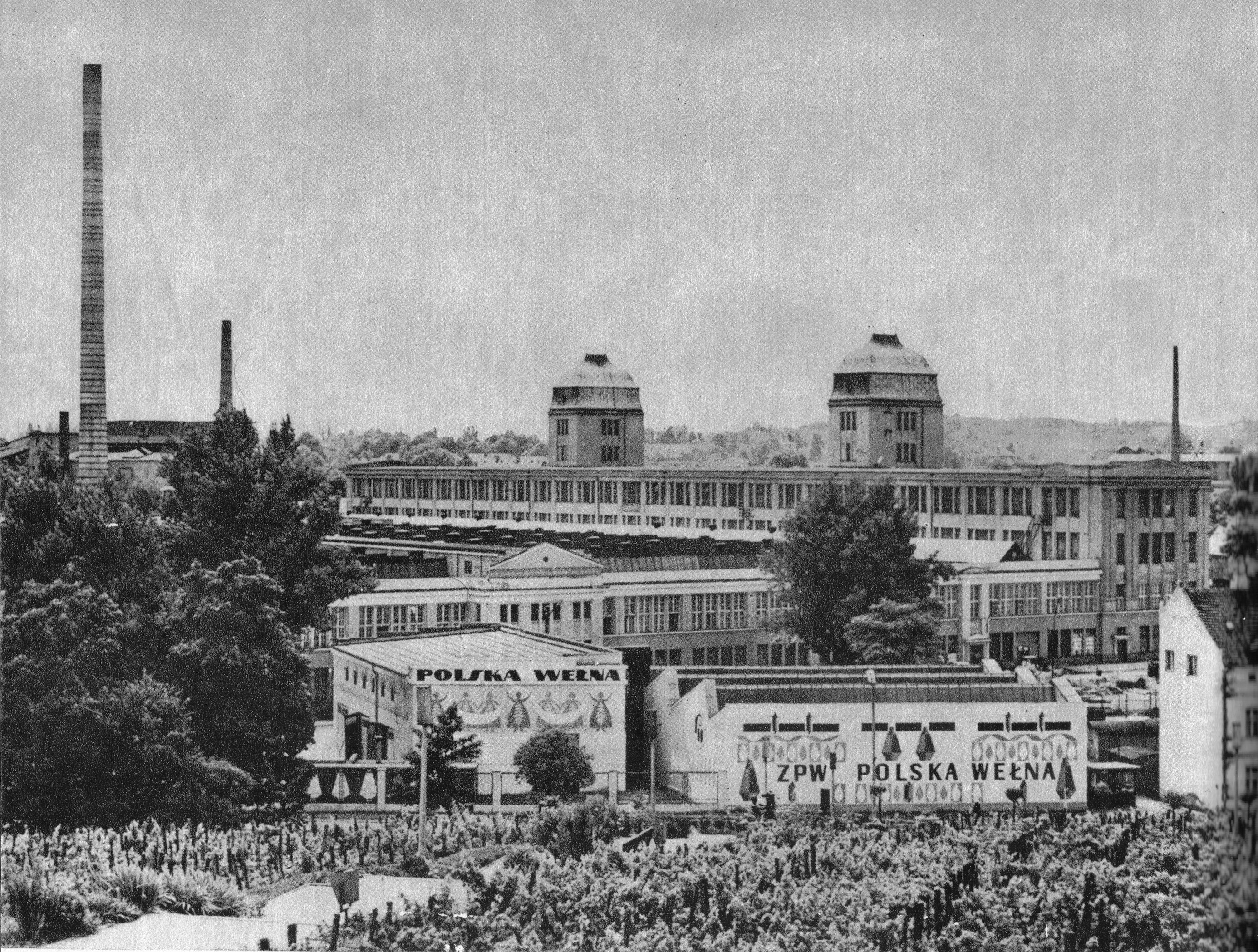
Wool factory in the 1960s

From 1950 to 1998 Zielona Góra was the capital of the Zielona Góra Voivodeship. The city's population rebounded quickly after the war. By 1950 it had more inhabitants than at any point in its history.

The University of Zielona Góra was opened in 2001. The city is also the seat of the Roman Catholic Diocese of Zielona Góra-Gorzów.

== Geography ==
Zielona Góra is surrounded by tree-covered hills. The adjacent woodland makes up approximately half of the city's total area. The name of the city translates to 'Green Mountain' in both Polish and German. Zielona Góra features several tourist attractions and important historical sites including the preserved medieval Old Town, 13th-century Market Square, tenements, palaces, parks and the famous Palm House on Wine Hill. Its strong connection to vineyards and grape-picking earned Zielona Góra the nickname "The City of Wine".

=== Wineries ===
The city has been known for its wines for centuries. It is now one of two places in Poland with wine grape cultivation mainly for white wines, the other being the wine growing region near the town of Warka in Masovia. The first wineries around the city were built in 1314. At the Paradyż Abbey near Zielona Góra, monks have been making wine since 1250. The number of vineyards at peak production is estimated at 4,000 in the region, with 2,500 in Zielona Góra itself.

During the communist era wine production was reduced, but since 1990 it has recovered. Since 1852, an annual wine festival has taken place in the town. Wine is no longer produced in Zielona Góra itself, with the last factory closed in the early 1990s.

Vodka Luksusowa (namely: Luxury vodka), made from potatoes rather than grain, is produced in distillery in Zielona Góra. Jarzębiak, a Polish fruit vodka made from rowan berries and other fruit ingredients, registered as a regional traditional beverage by the Ministry of Agriculture and Rural Development of Poland, is also produced in Zielona Góra.

Another officially designated traditional beverage is the Zielona Góra beer, with local brewing traditions dating back to the 18th century.

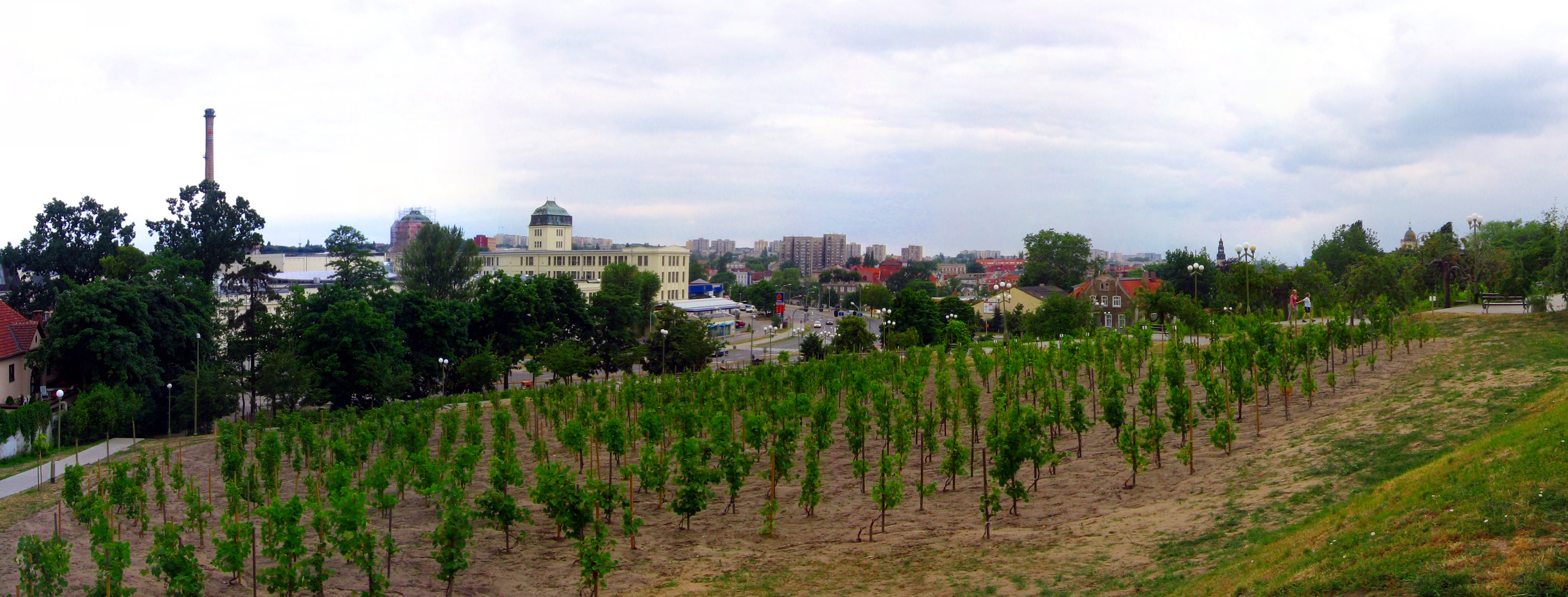
A panorama of the city from the vineyards

== Climate ==
The climate is oceanic (Köppen: Cfb). Despite being some distance from the sea, western standards as well as air masses are still predominant in the western than eastern, not very different from German cities near the border.

Climate data for Zielona Gora (Słowackiego), elevation: 192 m, 1991–2020 normals, extremes 1951–present
Month	Jan	Feb	Mar	Apr	May	Jun	Jul	Aug	Sep	Oct	Nov	Dec	Year
Record high °C (°F)	16.1 (61.0)	20.4 (68.7)	24.2 (75.6)	30.4 (86.7)	31.2 (88.2)	36.9 (98.4)	36.6 (97.9)	36.8 (98.2)	32.7 (90.9)	27.6 (81.7)	19.8 (67.6)	17.0 (62.6)	36.9 (98.4)
Mean daily maximum °C (°F)	2.2 (36.0)	3.8 (38.8)	8.0 (46.4)	14.5 (58.1)	19.2 (66.6)	22.4 (72.3)	24.5 (76.1)	24.2 (75.6)	18.9 (66.0)	13.0 (55.4)	6.8 (44.2)	3.1 (37.6)	13.4 (56.1)
Daily mean °C (°F)	0.1 (32.2)	0.7 (33.3)	4.0 (39.2)	9.6 (49.3)	14.0 (57.2)	17.3 (63.1)	19.3 (66.7)	19.1 (66.4)	14.4 (57.9)	9.3 (48.7)	4.2 (39.6)	0.8 (33.4)	9.4 (48.9)
Mean daily minimum °C (°F)	−2.0 (28.4)	−1.8 (28.8)	0.8 (33.4)	5.2 (41.4)	9.5 (49.1)	12.8 (55.0)	14.9 (58.8)	14.7 (58.5)	10.7 (51.3)	6.3 (43.3)	2.0 (35.6)	−1.4 (29.5)	5.9 (42.6)
Record low °C (°F)	−23.1 (−9.6)	−29.5 (−21.1)	−17.2 (1.0)	−5.9 (21.4)	−3.4 (25.9)	2.2 (36.0)	6.9 (44.4)	4.5 (40.1)	1.1 (34.0)	−5.8 (21.6)	−12.4 (9.7)	−20.1 (−4.2)	−29.5 (−21.1)
Average precipitation mm (inches)	44.2 (1.74)	35.6 (1.40)	45.2 (1.78)	30.6 (1.20)	52.7 (2.07)	55.7 (2.19)	90.1 (3.55)	65.3 (2.57)	48.3 (1.90)	41.0 (1.61)	40.5 (1.59)	39.7 (1.56)	588.8 (23.18)
Average extreme snow depth cm (inches)	6.2 (2.4)	6.3 (2.5)	4.0 (1.6)	1.5 (0.6)	0.0 (0.0)	0.0 (0.0)	0.0 (0.0)	0.0 (0.0)	0.0 (0.0)	0.3 (0.1)	1.9 (0.7)	4.2 (1.7)	6.3 (2.5)
Average precipitation days (≥ 0.1 mm)	17.97	14.66	14.63	10.90	12.47	13.17	13.90	12.37	11.23	13.53	15.57	17.17	167.56
Average snowy days (≥ 0 cm)	14.1	11.7	5.4	0.7	0.0	0.0	0.0	0.0	0.0	0.2	2.7	8.4	43.2
Average relative humidity (%)	87.7	83.1	76.3	65.7	66.5	67.1	67.3	68.3	76.3	83.2	89.2	89.4	76.6
Mean monthly sunshine hours	51.7	73.9	121.8	189.9	225.1	224.1	239.3	229.0	159.5	111.6	56.6	42.1	1,724.7
Source 1: Institute of Meteorology and Water Management
Source 2: Meteomodel.pl (records, relative humidity 1991–2020)

== Demographics ==
Historical population

Year	Pop.	±%
1740	3,494	—
1843	10,405	+197.8%
1900	20,983	+101.7%
1939	26,076	+24.3%
1946	15,738	−39.6%

Year	Pop.	±%
1950	31,634	+101.0%
1960	54,291	+71.6%
1970	73,485	+35.4%
1980	101,091	+37.6%
1990	114,126	+12.9%

Year	Pop.	±%
2000	118,103	+3.5%
2010	117,699	−0.3%
2020	140,892	+19.7%

== Sights ==
Among the landmarks of Zielona Góra are:

- Market Square (Rynek) with the town hall
- Co-cathedral church of St Hedwig of Silesia - Gothic with later modifications
- Our Lady of Częstochowa church - timber-framed from 18th century, formerly protestant
- Łaziebna tower - part of the former city walls
- Palm house
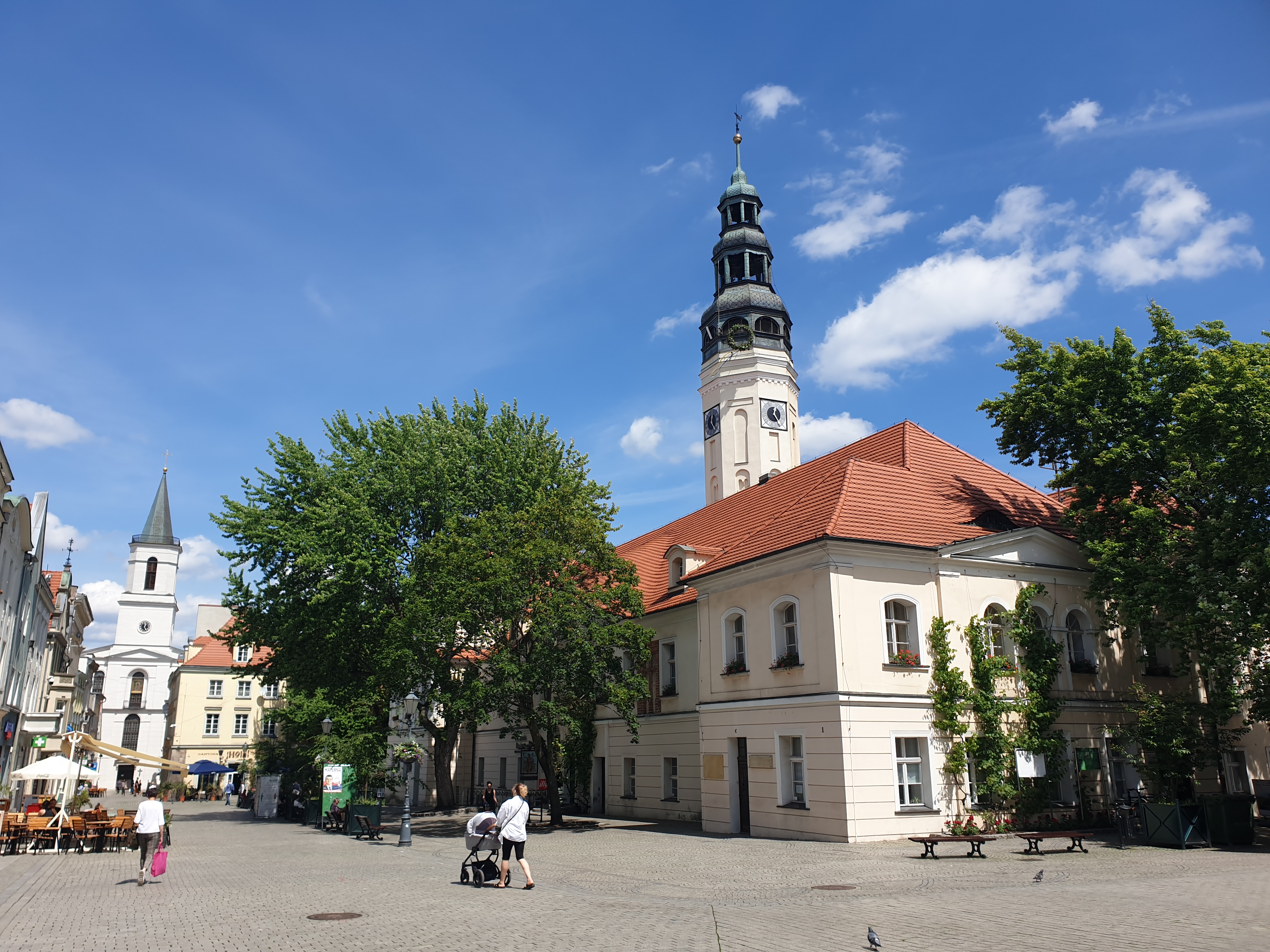
Market Square (Rynek) with the town hall

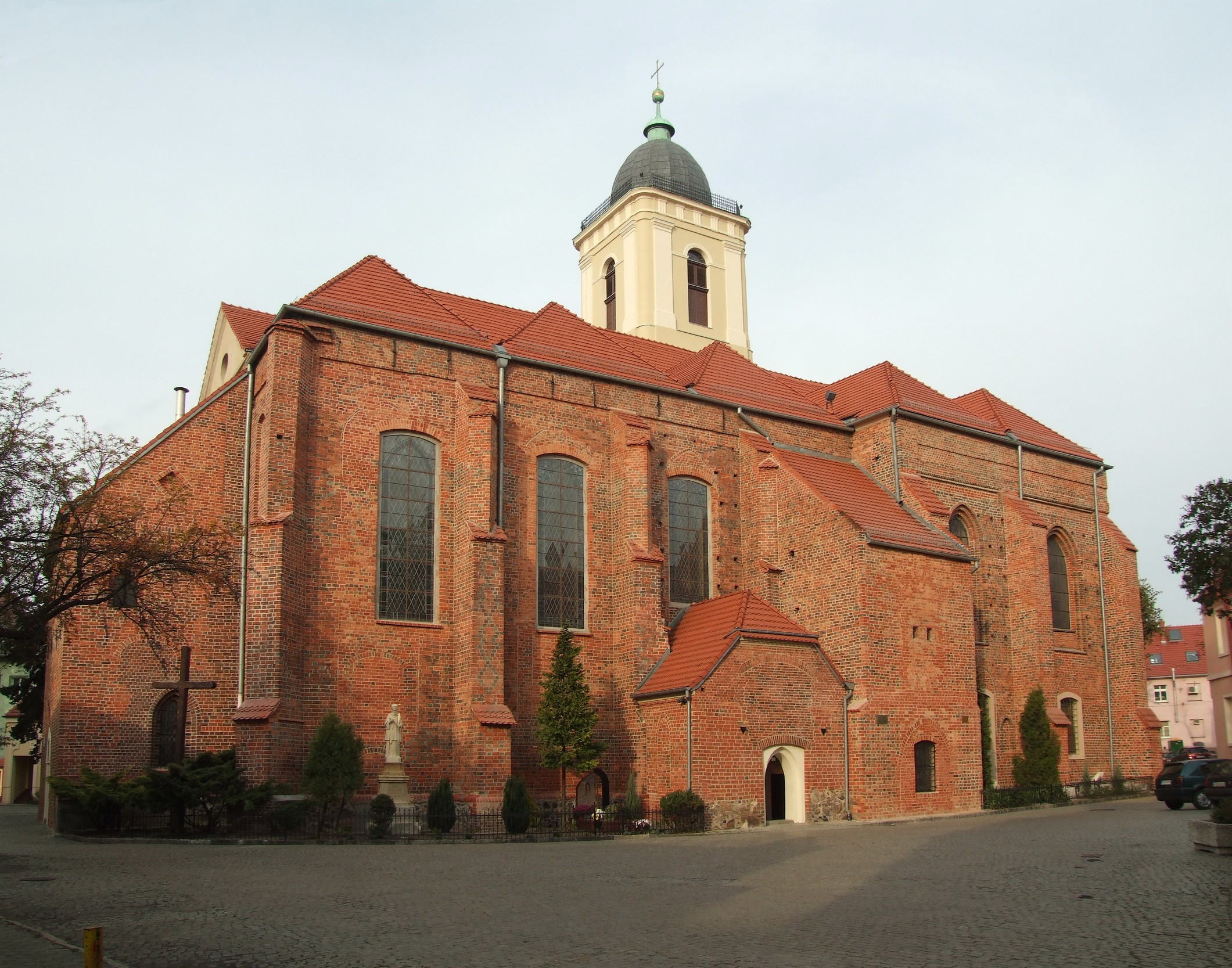
Co-cathedral church of St Hedwig of Silesia

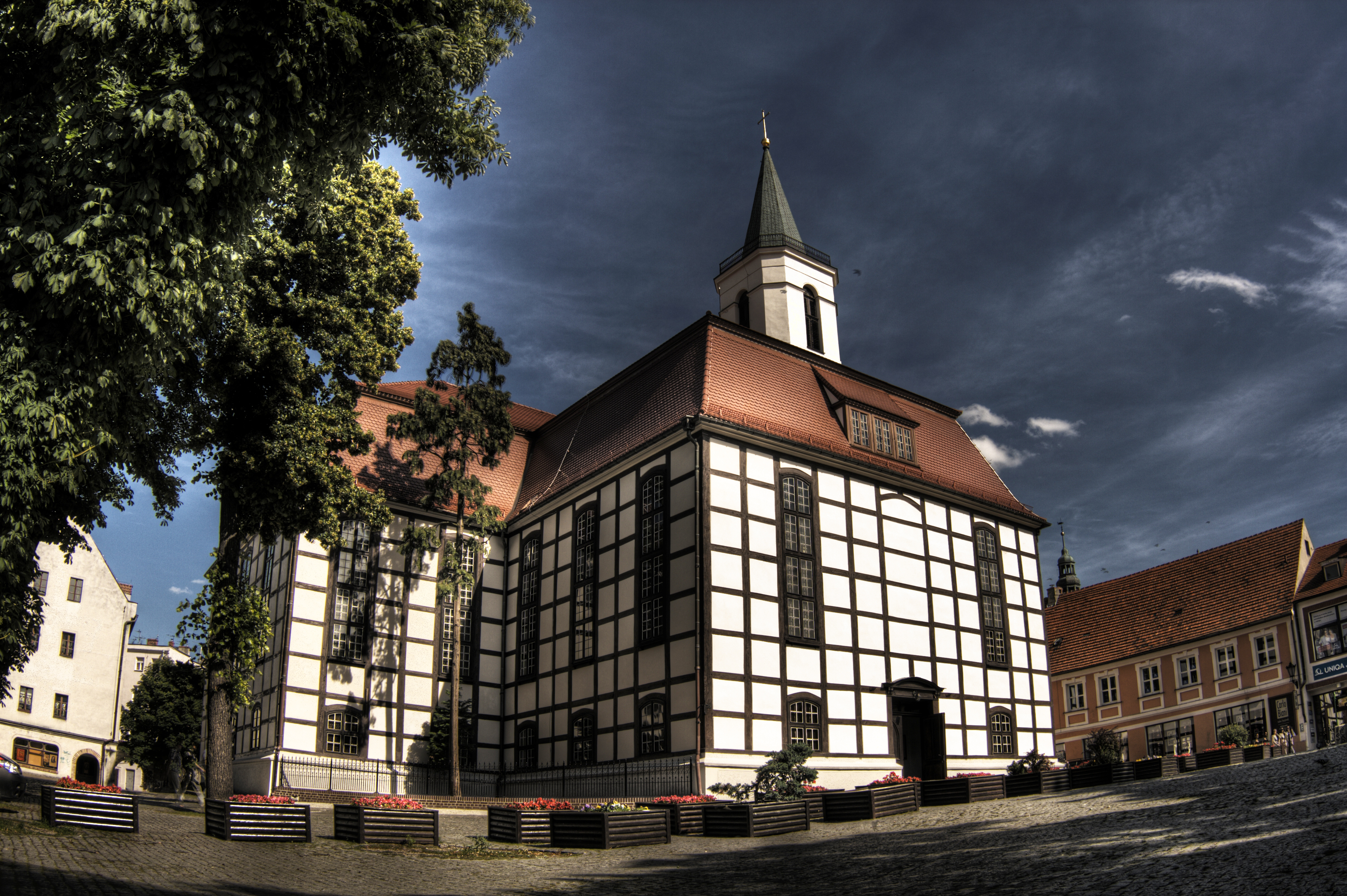
Our Lady of Częstochowa church

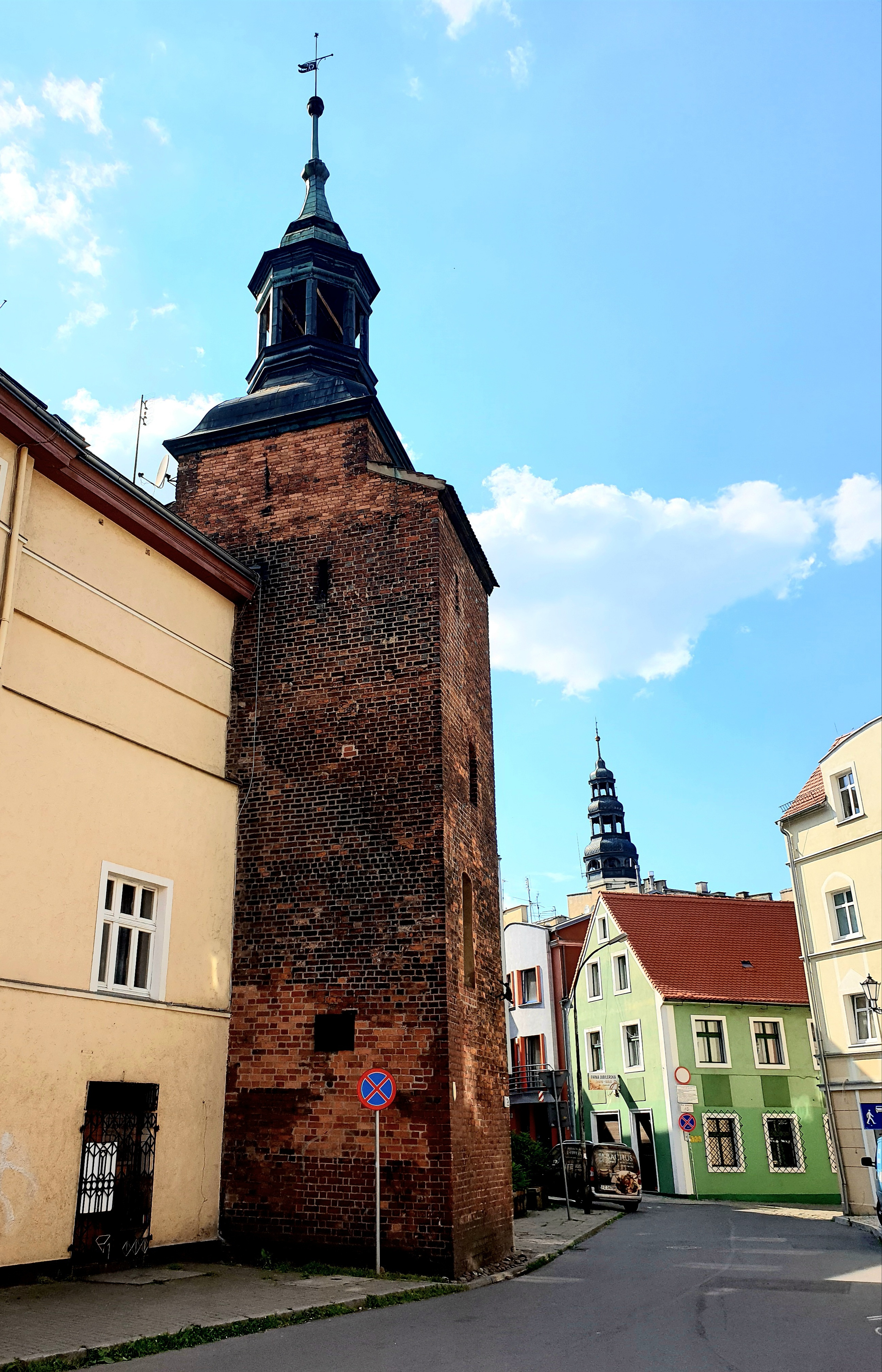
Łaziebna tower

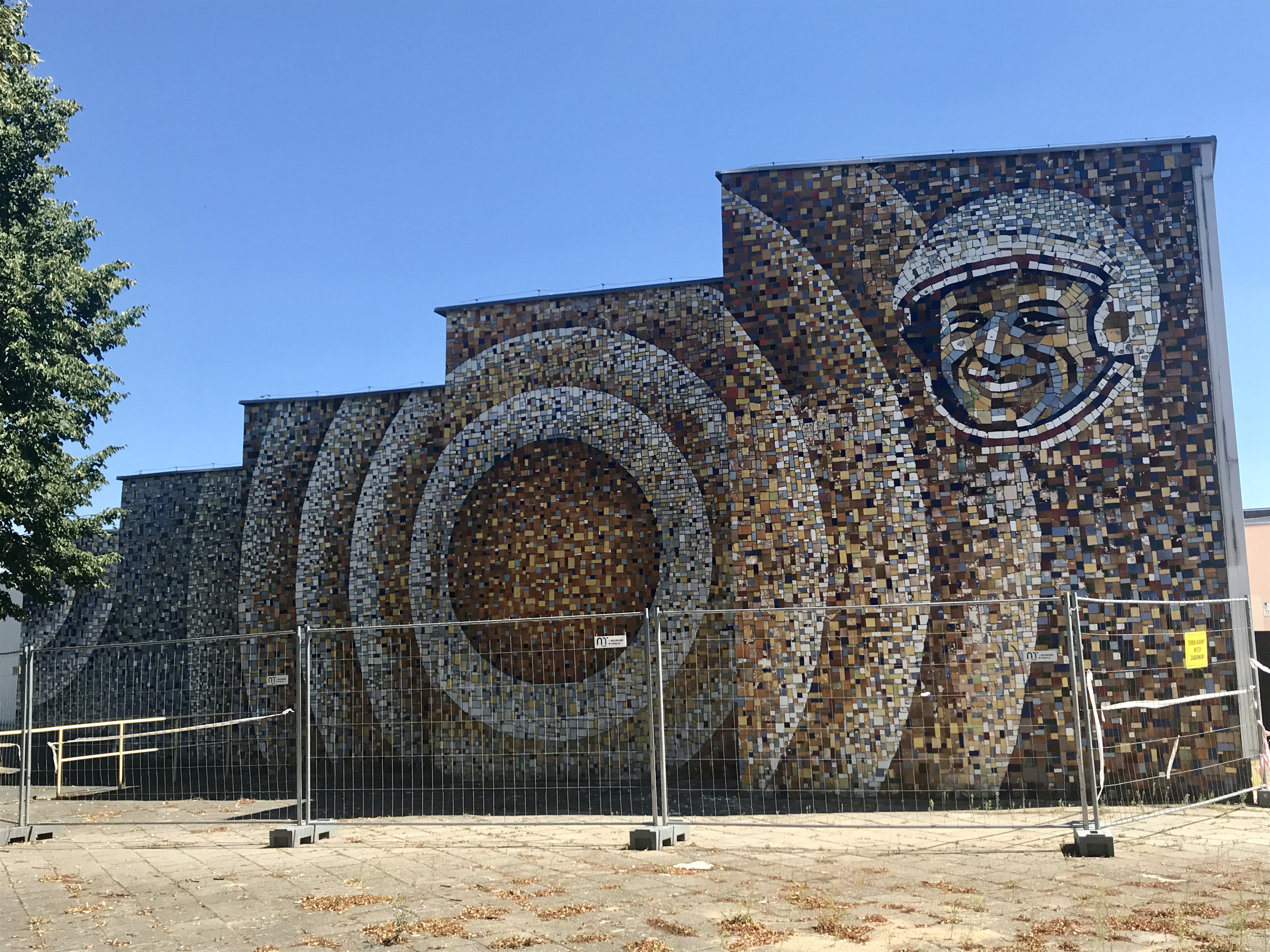
Gagarin mosaic on the aula of the University of Zielona Góra

== Education ==
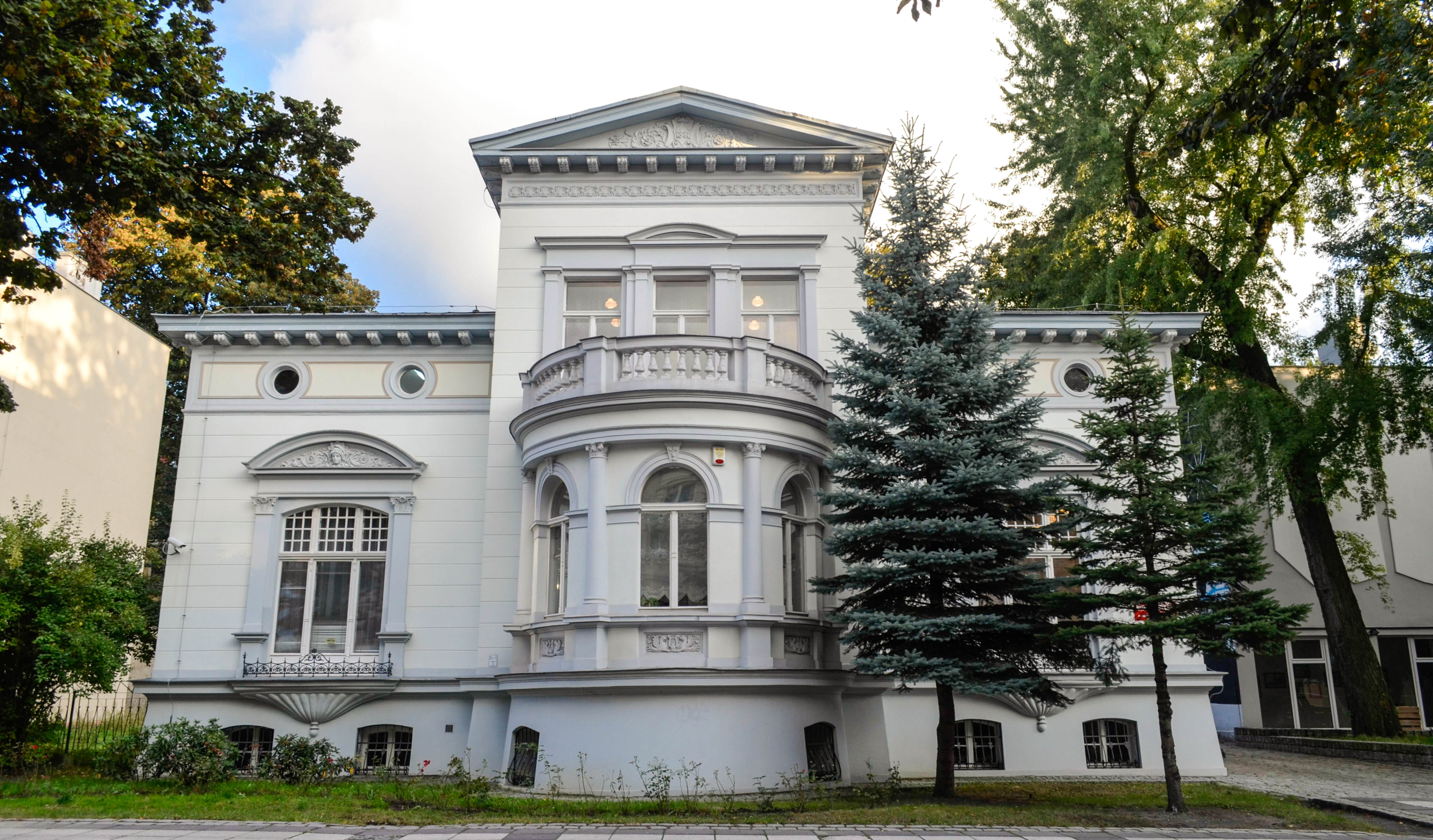
Music school

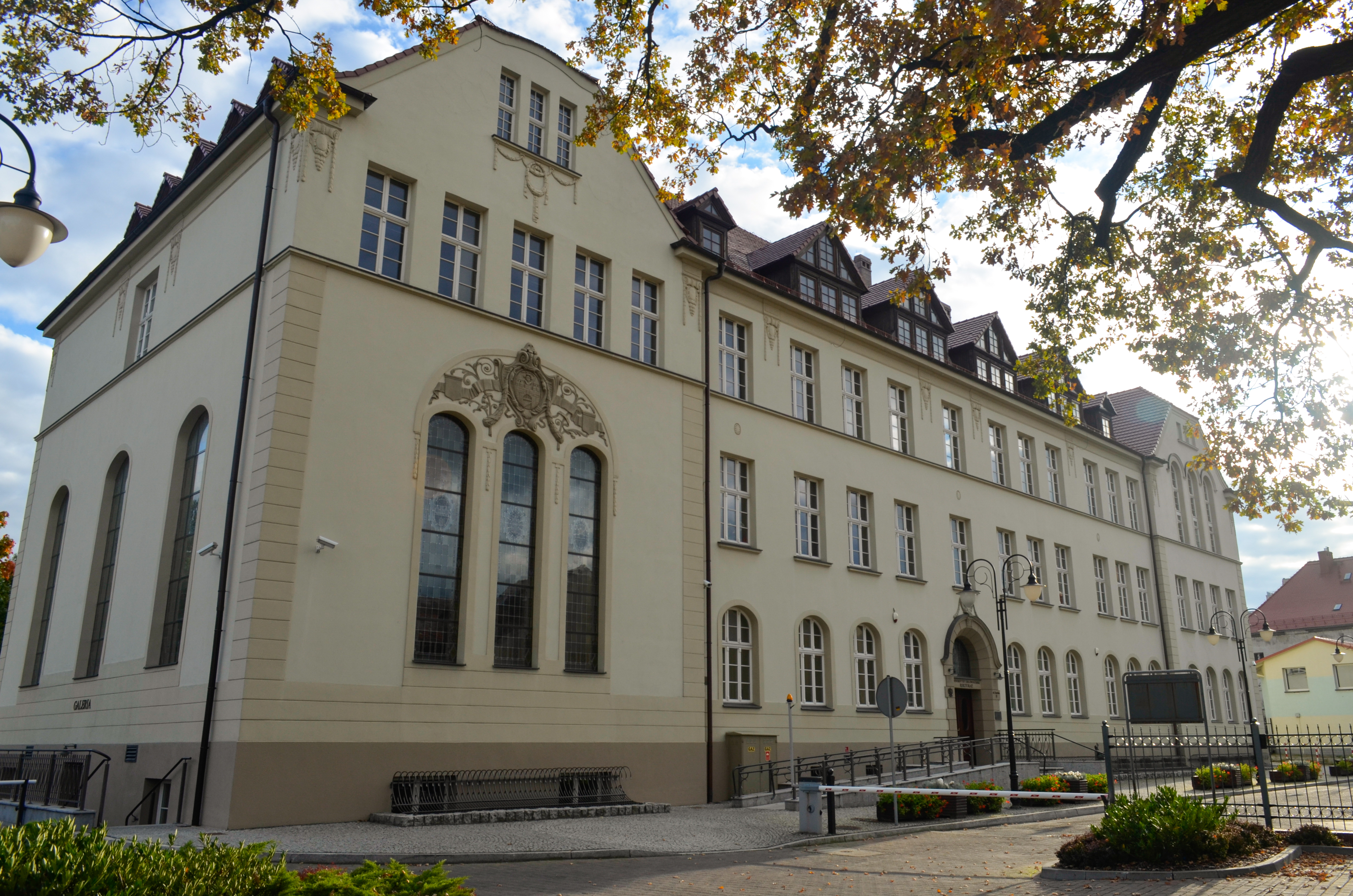
University of Zielona Góra

The city has a university and a College of International Trade and Finance. Currently there are 18,000 students studying in the city.

=== Secondary education ===
Secondary education is based on the high school type of educational facility.

- I High School
- III High School
- IV High School
- V High School
- Seventh General Lyceum
- Schools of Electronics
- Schools of Economics

=== Universities and colleges ===
- University of Zielona Góra Uniwersytet Zielonogórski
- From 1997 until 2014: College of International Trade and Finance

== Transport ==
Zielona Góra Airport is located at Babimost, north-east of the city. It is currently the eleventh busiest airport in Poland, in terms of traffic size. Formerly a military base, it has become an important transport hub for western Poland. LOT Polish Airlines currently offers daily flights to Warsaw.

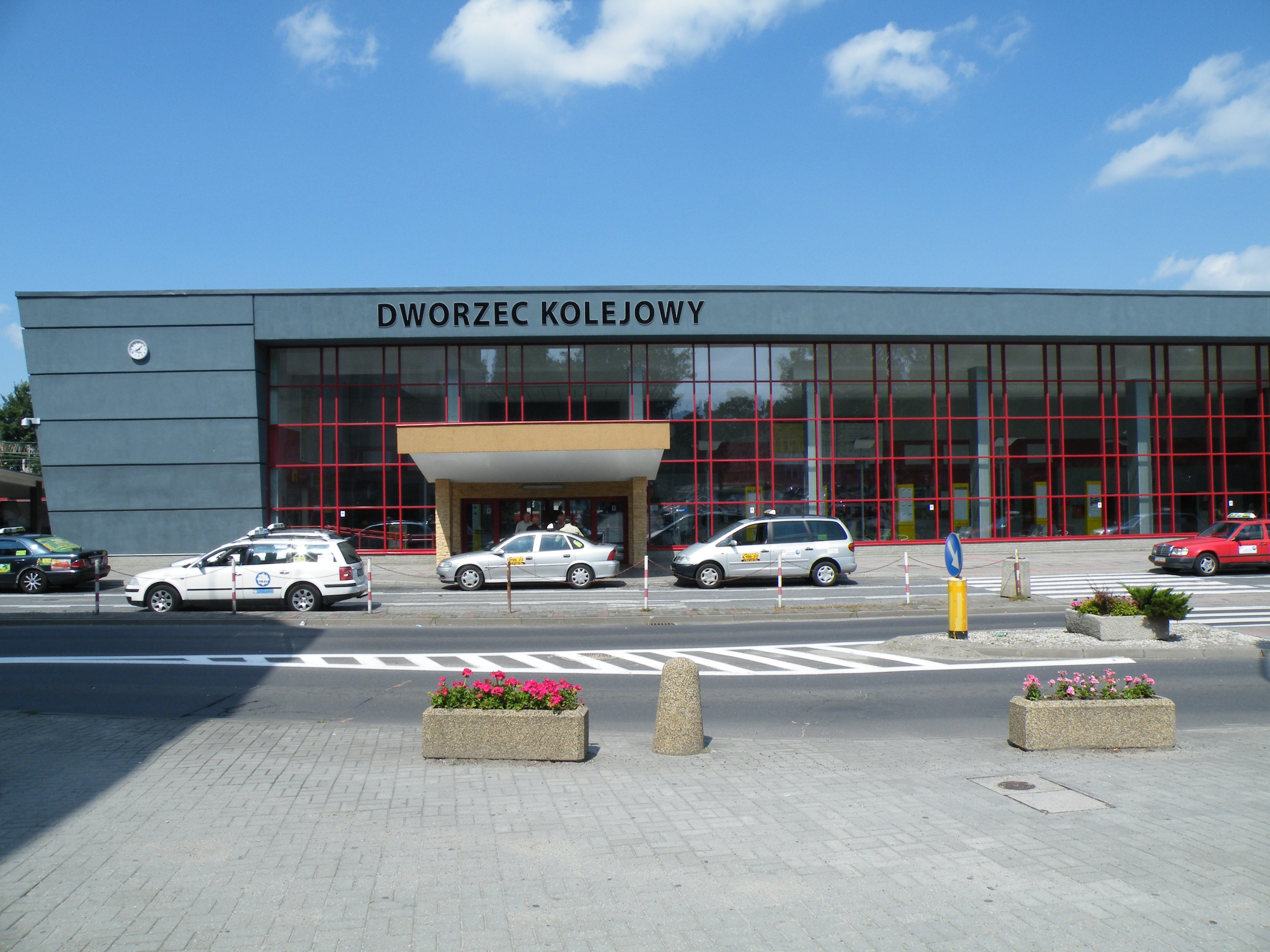
Zielona Góra Główna railway station

The city lies at the junction of National Road 3, National Road 27 and National Road 32 and is a major interchange on S3 Expressway along European route E65.

Zielona Góra Główna railway station is the most important railway station of Zielona Góra. It has train connections to Gorzów Wielkopolski, Zbąszynek, Rzepin, Warsaw, Frankfurt (Oder) and Kraków, main cities of the surrounding regions: Poznań, Szczecin and Wrocław as well as direct international connections to Berlin, Vienna.

== Events ==
- June/July: Busker Bus Festival
- August: Folk Song and Dance Festival Folk Festival
- September: Winobranie (Wine Fest)

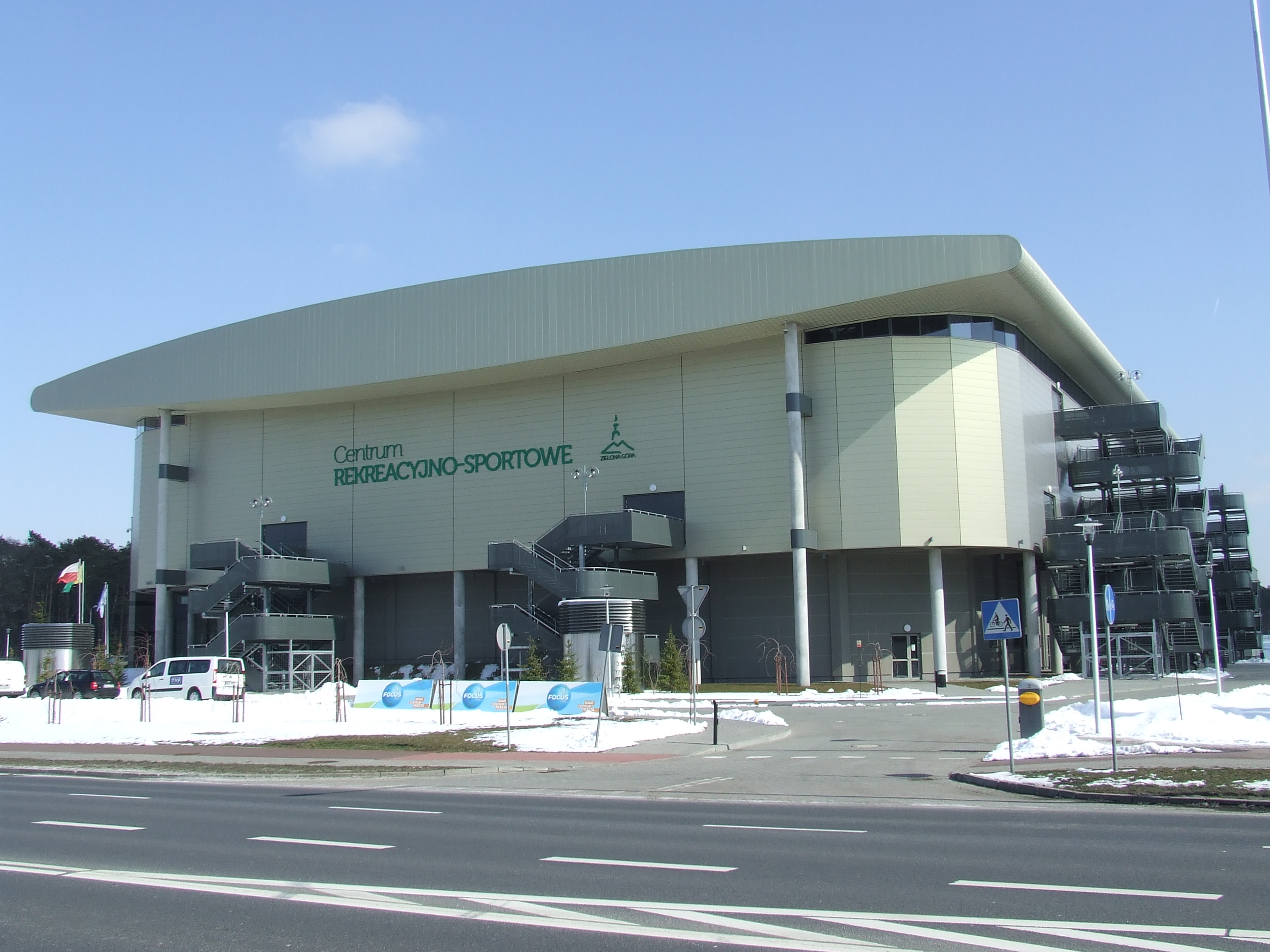
CRS Hall Zielona Góra, the city's main indoor hall, home venue of the Zastal Zielona Góra basketball team

== Sports ==
Zielona Góra is home to many sports teams, both professional and amateur. Motorcycle speedway is considered the most popular sport in the city, with the local club, Falubaz Zielona Góra, being one of the most historic, successful, and well-supported teams in the country. The city is also represented by Zastal Zielona Góra, a basketball club that has enjoyed a period of significant success in recent years. In football, Lechia Zielona Góra competes in II Liga, the third tier of the Polish league pyramid.

Professional sports teams in Zielona Góra
Club	Sport	League	Honours	Venue
Falubaz Zielona Góra	Speedway	PGE Ekstraliga	7 Polish Championships (1981, 1982, 1985, 1991, 2009, 2011, 2013)	Swiss Krono Arena
Zastal Zielona Góra	Basketball	Orlen Basket Liga	5 Polish Championships (2013, 2015, 2016, 2017, 2020) 3 Polish Cups (2015, 2017, 2021)	CRS Hall Zielona Góra
Lechia Zielona Góra	Football	Betclic II Liga	None	Stadion Piłkarski "Dołek"

== Notable people ==
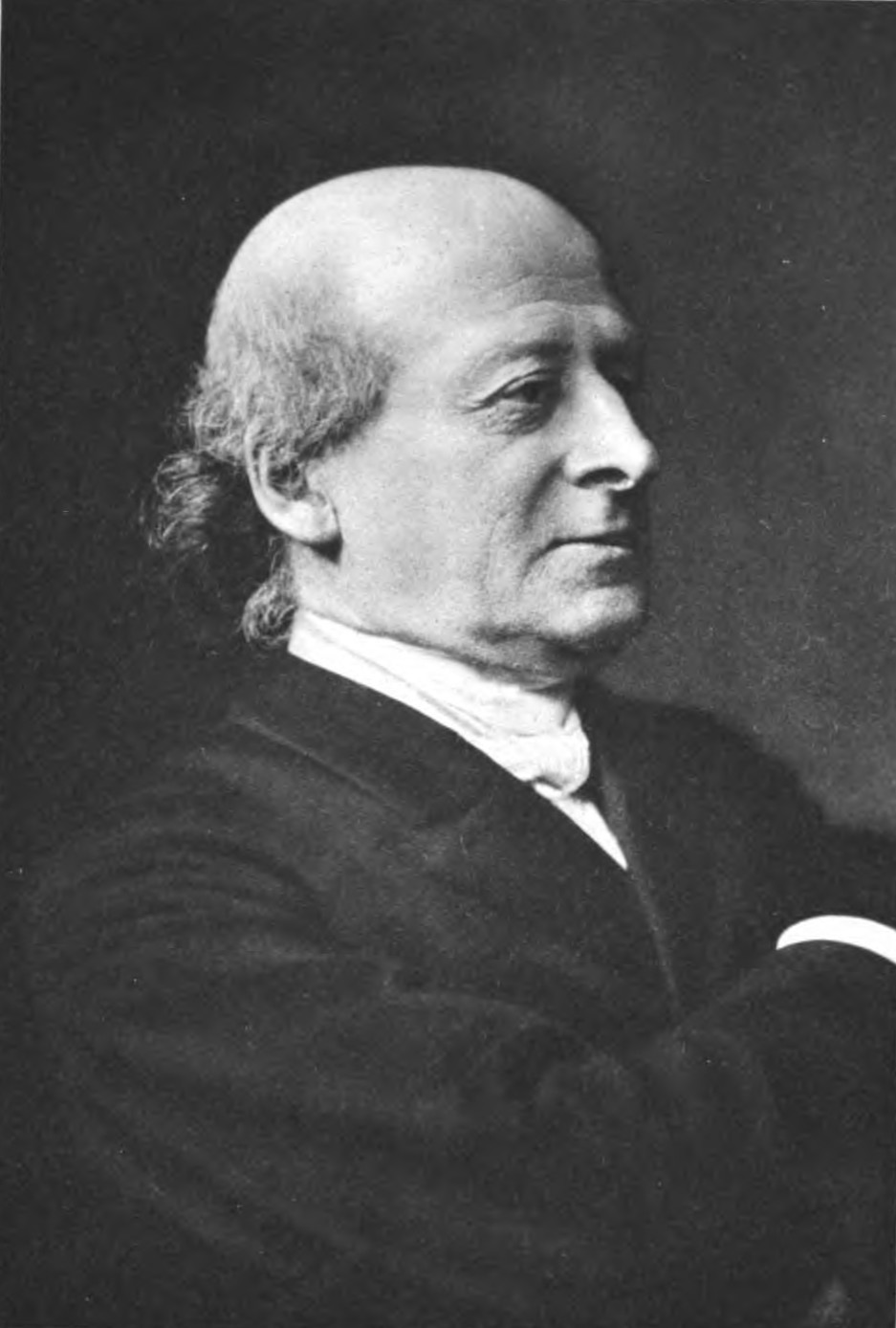
Rudolf Haym, 1902

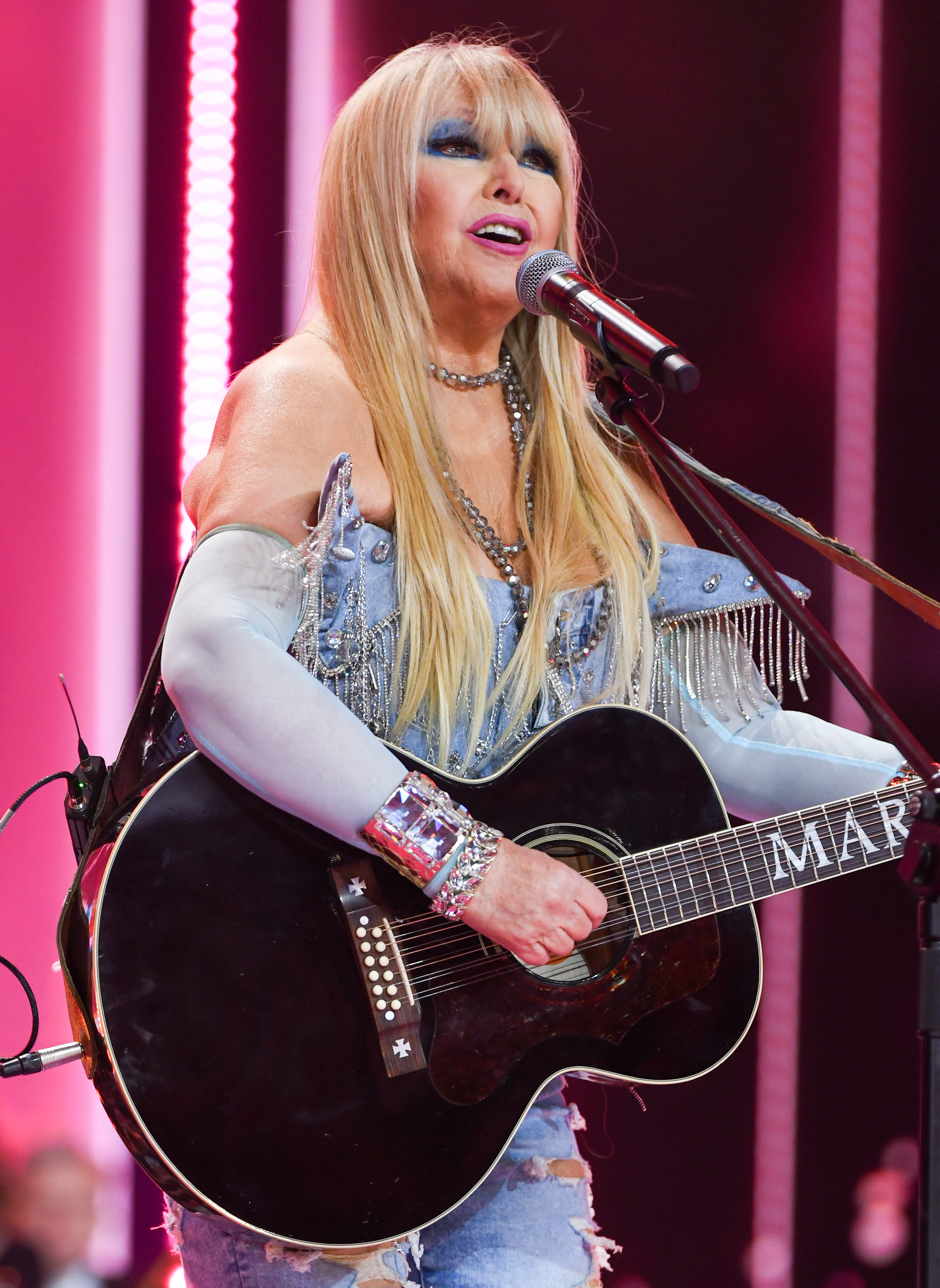
Maryla Rodowicz, 2023

- Bartholomaeus Pitiscus (1561–1613), mathematician, theologian, astronomer
- Abraham Scultetus (1566–1625), theologian
- Tadeusz Kuntze (1727–1793), painter
- Rudolf Haym (1821–1901), philosopher
- Wilhelm Foerster (1832–1921), astronomer
- Otto Julius Bierbaum (1865–1910), writer
- Susanne Dessoir (1869–1953), soprano
- Franz Mattenklott (1884–1954), general
- Józef Zych (born 1938), lawyer and politician
- Prince Franz Wilhelm of Prussia (born 1943) great-grandson of Kaiser Wilhelm II
- Maryla Rodowicz (born 1945), singer
- Jürgen Colombo (born 1949), bicyclist
- Janusz C. Szajna (born 1954), entrepreneur and University of Zielona Góra professor
- Andrew Andrzej Twardon (born 1956), psychologist
- Maria Gładkowska (born 1957), actress
- Olga Tokarczuk (born 1962), writer (laureate of Nobel Prize in Literature)
- Tomasz Lis (born 1966), journalist
- Mariusz Linke (1969–2022), mixed martial arts fighter and world-class grappler
- Grzegorz Halama (born 1970), comedian
- Agnieszka Haupe-Kalka (born 1970), writer
- Piotr Protasiewicz (born 1975), speedway rider
- L.U.C (born 1981), rapper
- Grzegorz Zengota (born 1988), speedway rider
- Mateusz Kieliszkowski (born 1993), top international strongman competitor, 5 time Poland's Strongest Man
- Igor Waliłko (born 1997), racing driver
- Antoni Kowalski (born 2004), first Polish man to compete at the World Snooker Championship

== Twin towns – sister cities ==
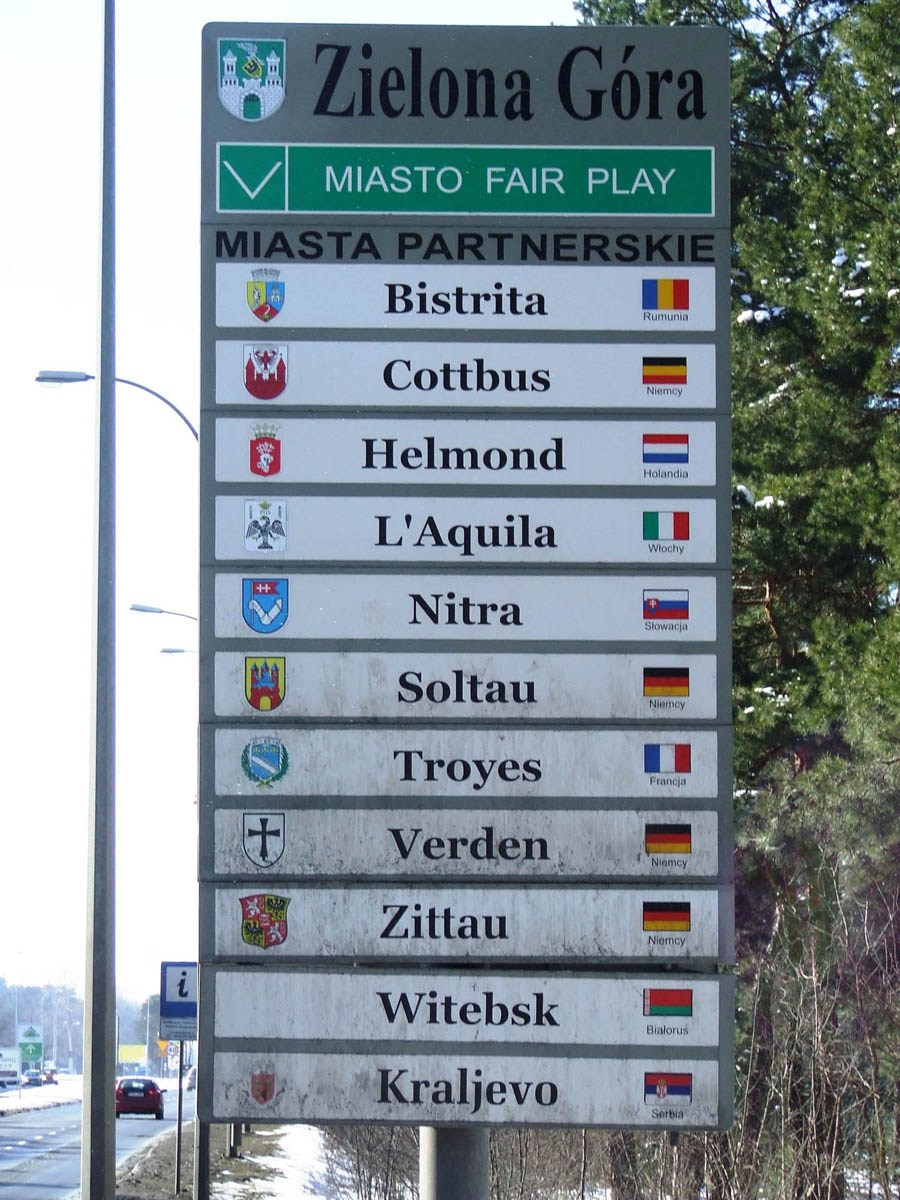
Zielona Góra's twin towns in 2013

Zielona Góra is twinned with:

- L'Aquila, Italy (1996)
- Bistriţa, Romania (2001)
- Cottbus, Germany (1990)
- Helmond, Netherlands (1993)
- Ivano-Frankivsk, Ukraine (2000)
- Kraljevo, Serbia (1974)
- Nitra, Slovakia (1992)
- Troyes, France (1970)
- Verden an der Aller, Germany (1993)
- (Georgia (country)) Batumi, Georgia (2022)
- Wuxi, China (2009)
- Zittau, Germany (2010)

=== Friendly cities ===
- Soltau, Germany (1997)

== Gallery ==
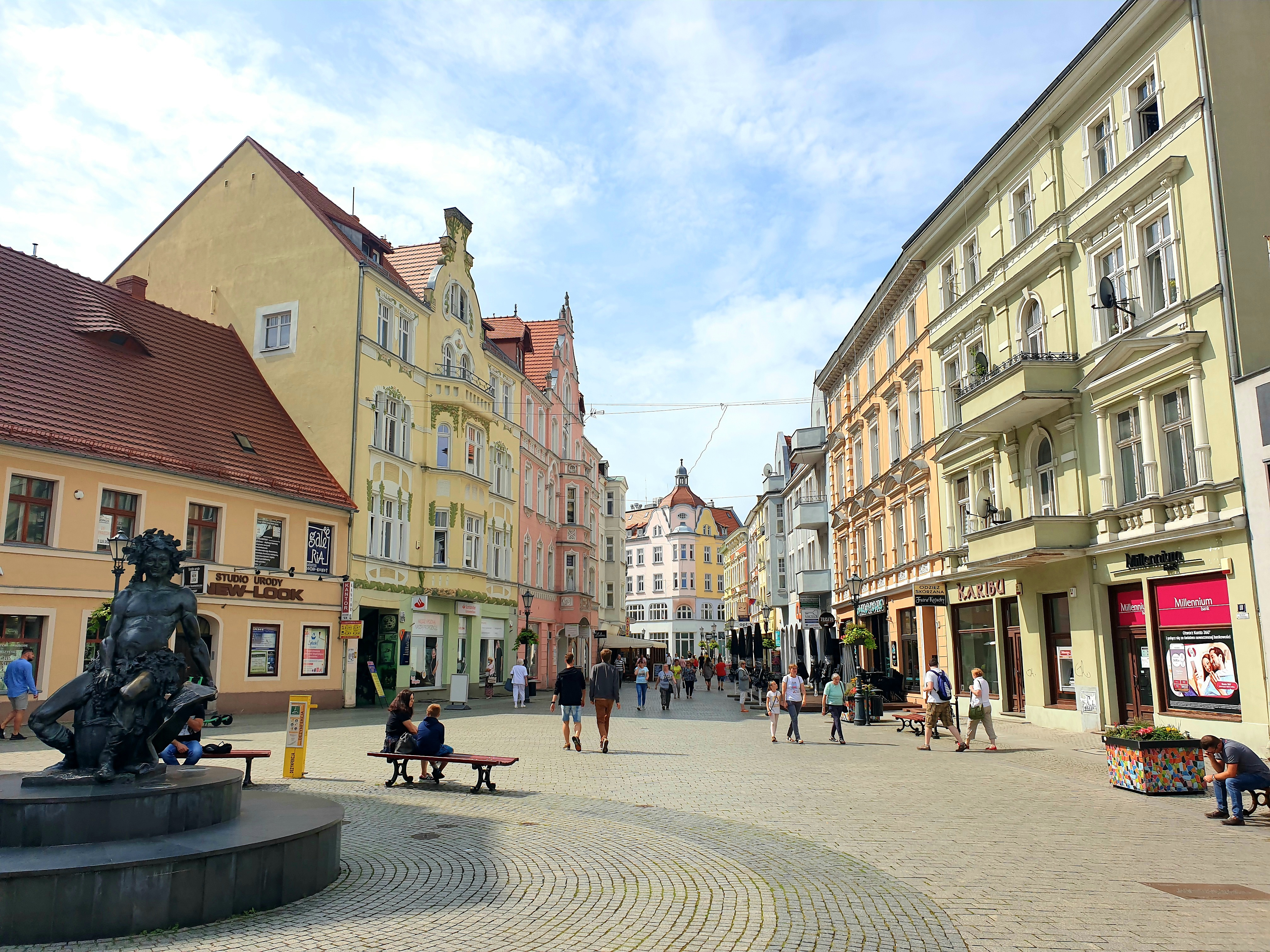
Żeromskiego Street in the Old Town

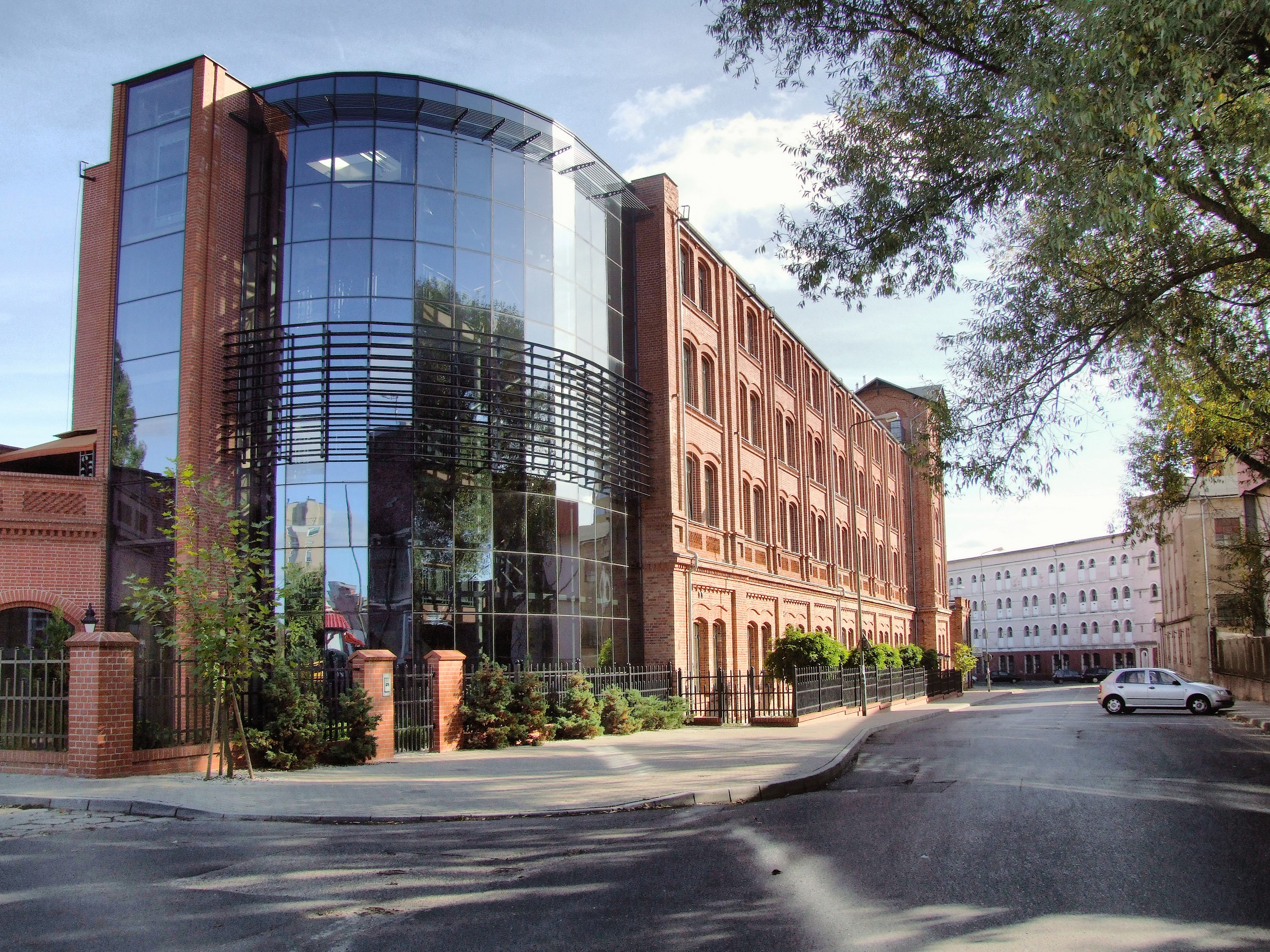
Lofts in Zielona Góra

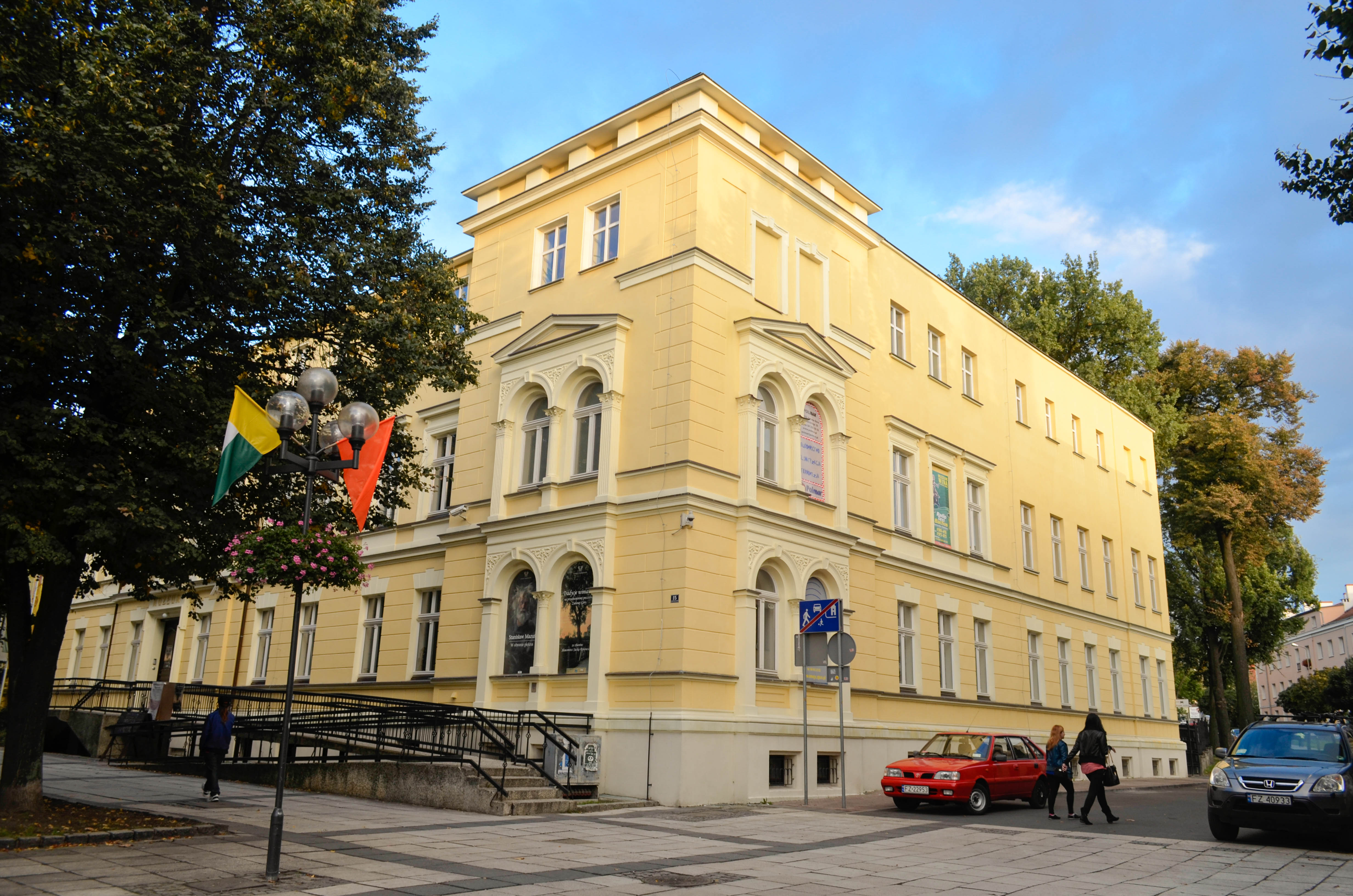
Local museum

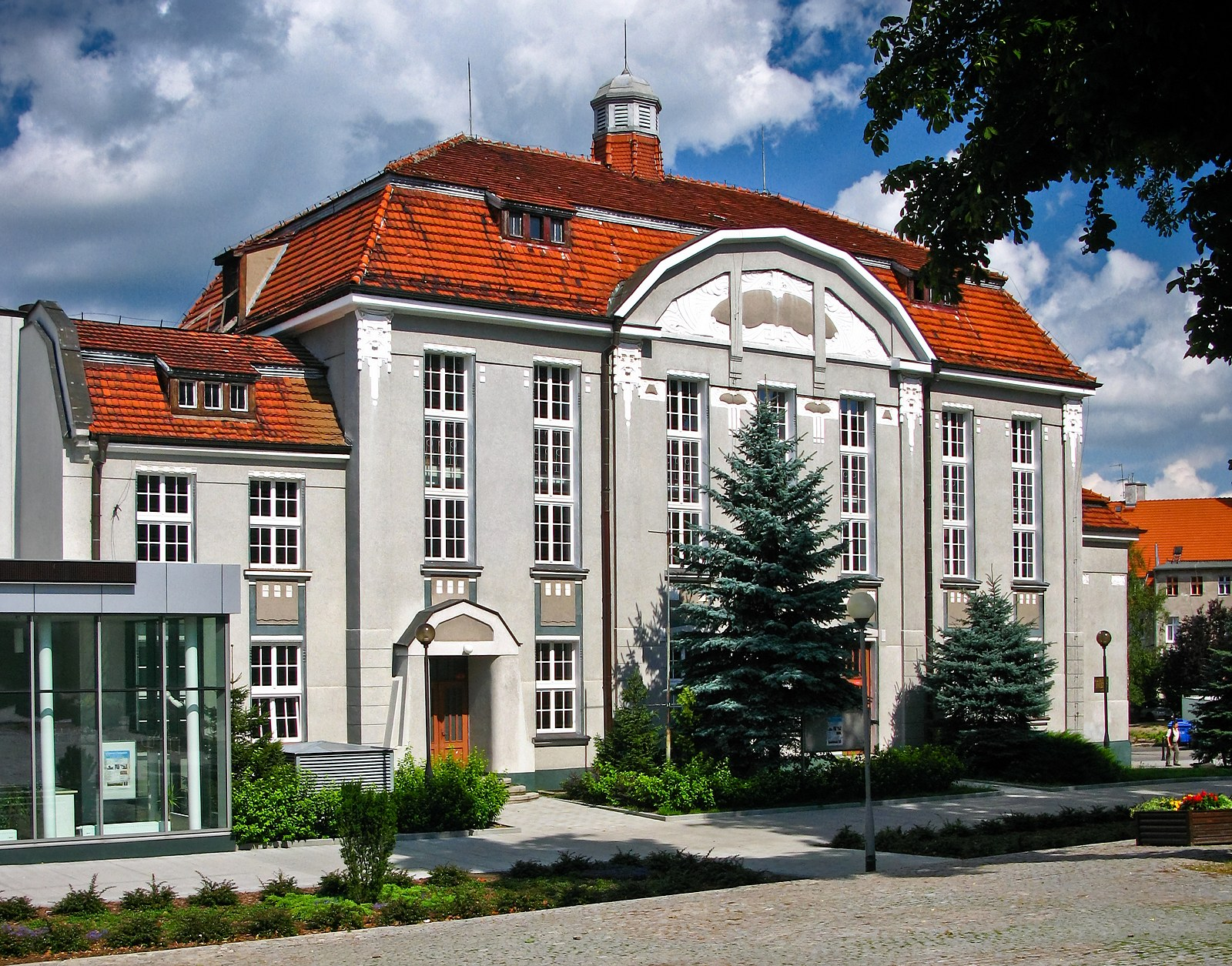
Zielona Góra Philharmonic

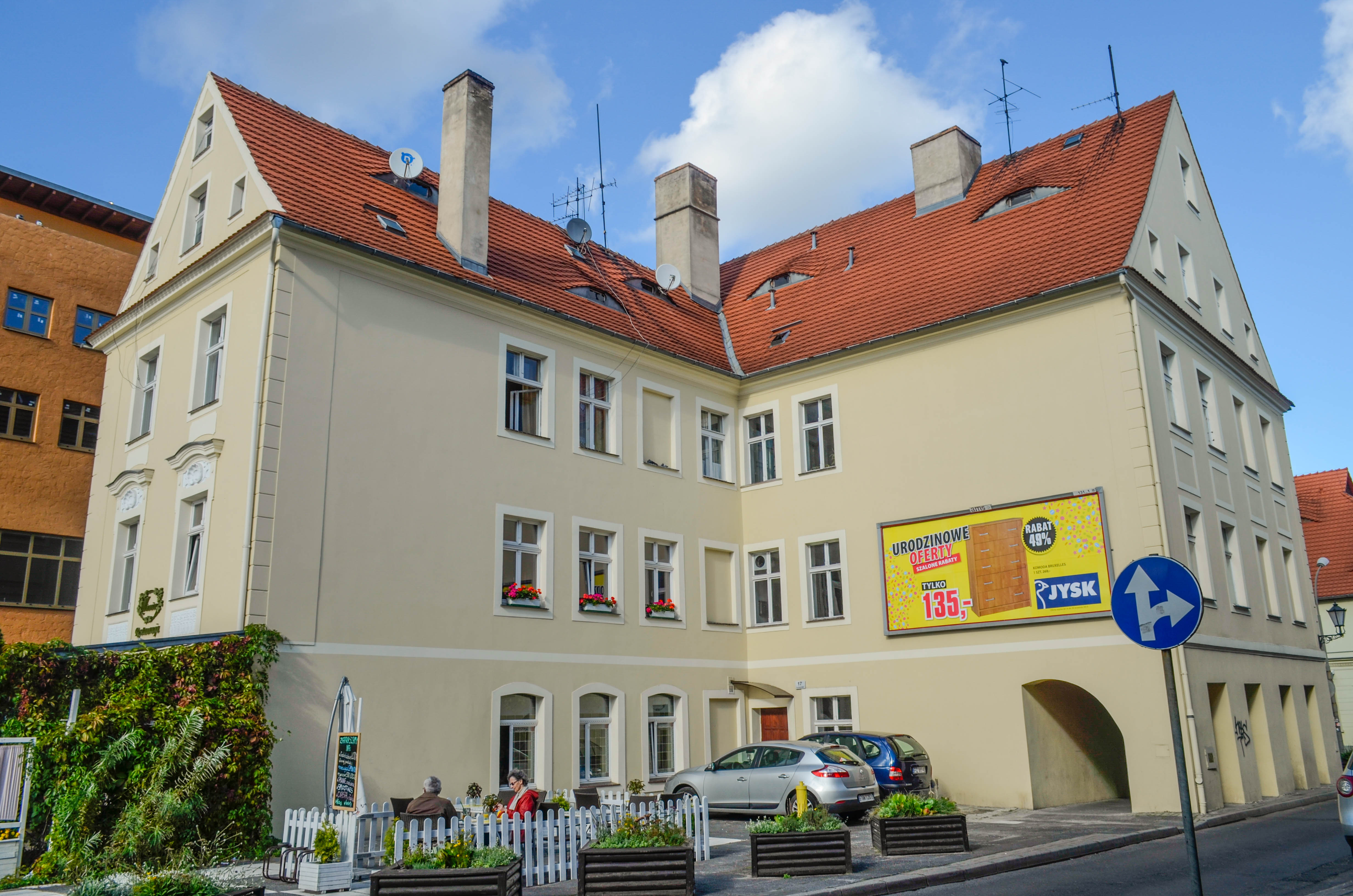
Tenement at Plac Pocztowy (Postal Square)

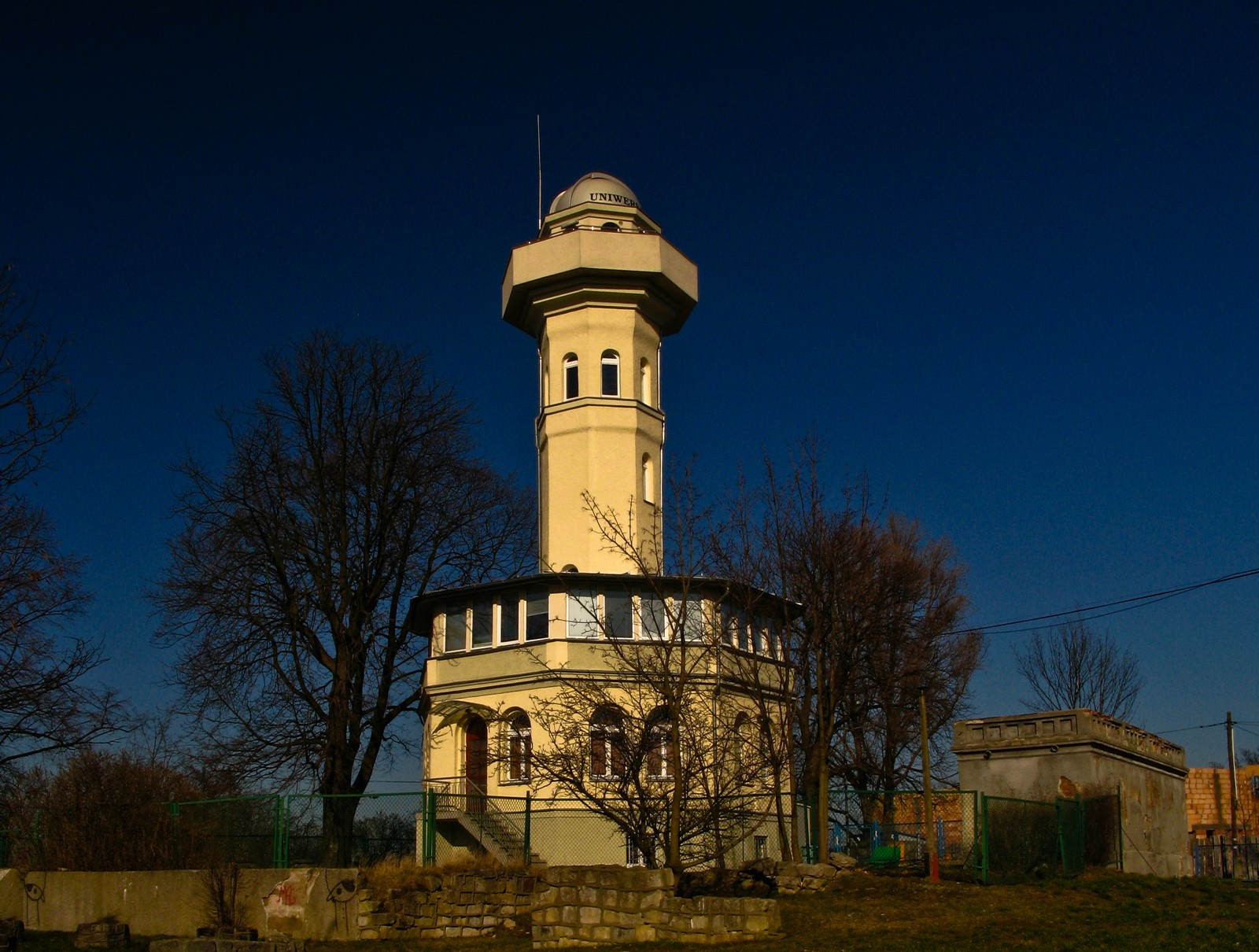
Astronomical observatory

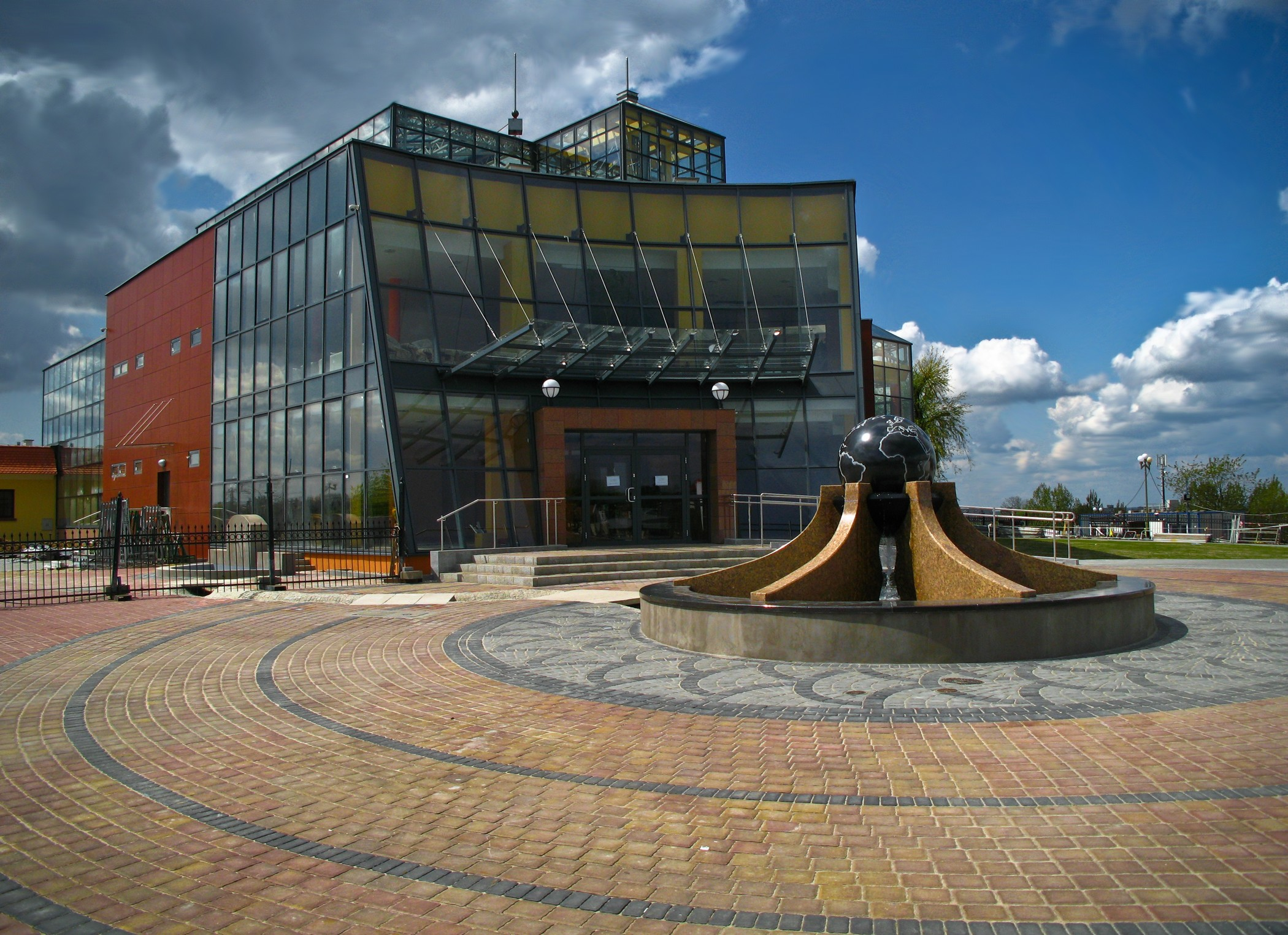
Palm house with restaurant on Wine Hill

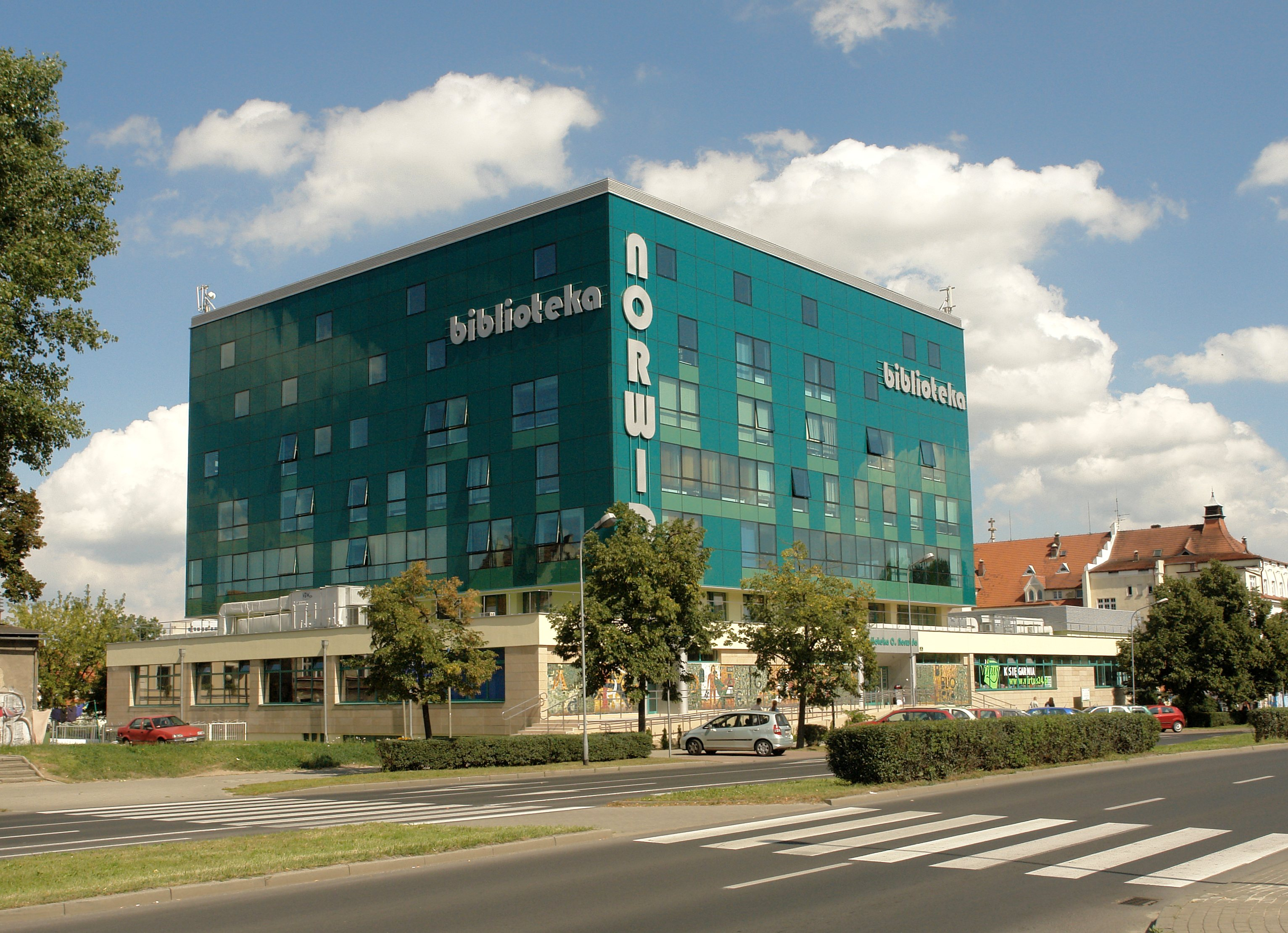
Cyprian Norwid Provincial and Municipal Public Library

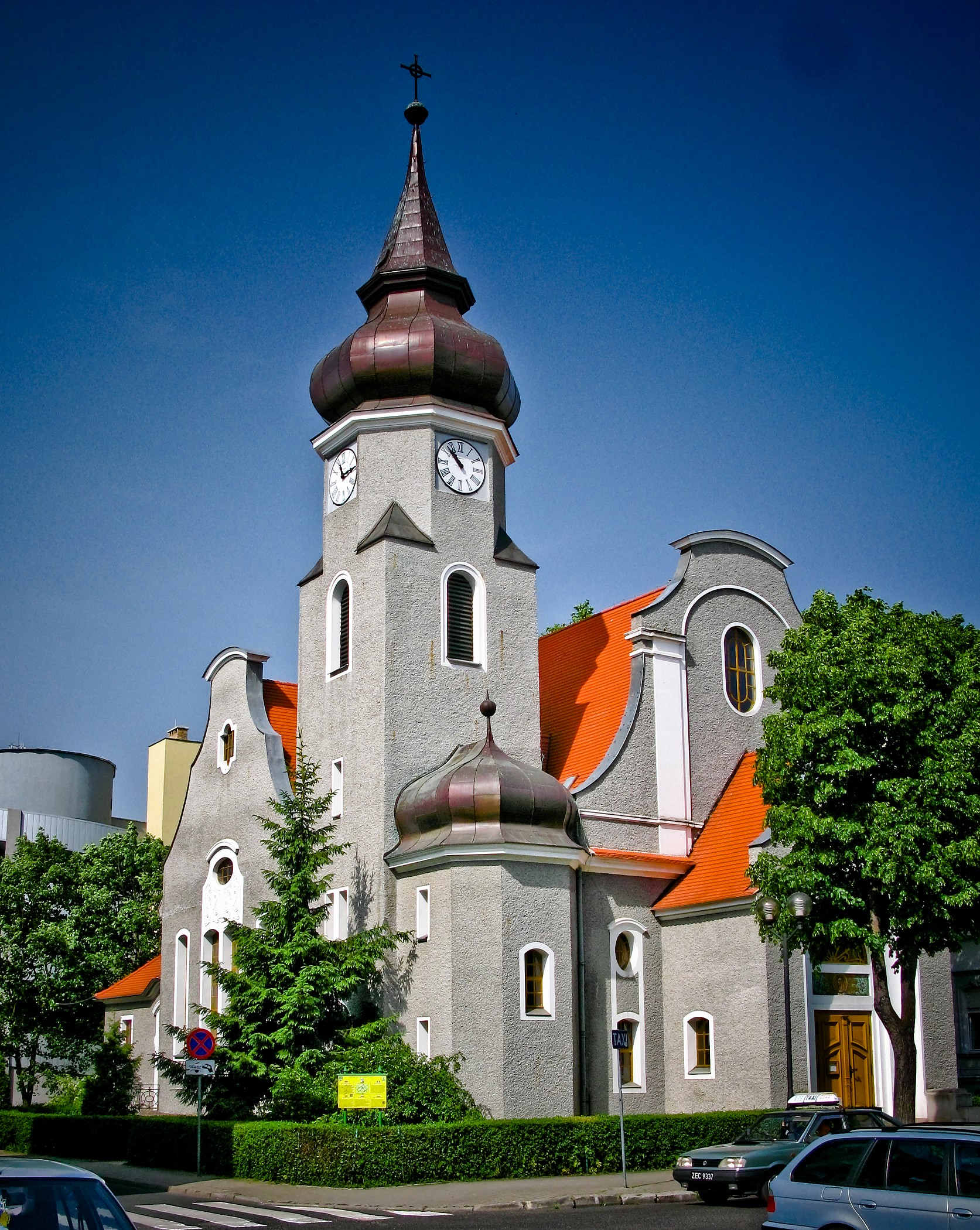
Lutheran church

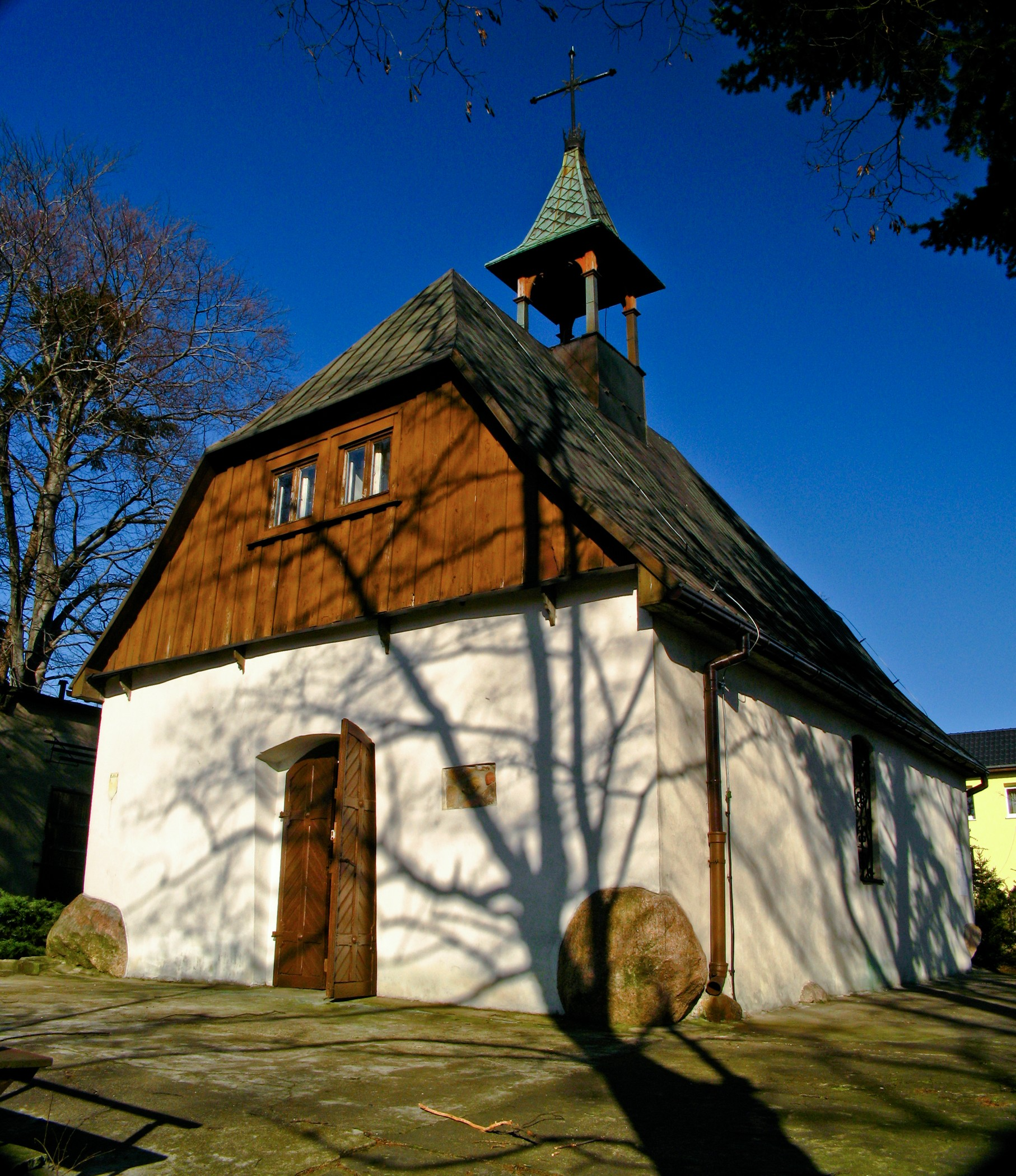
14th-century chapel on Wine Hill

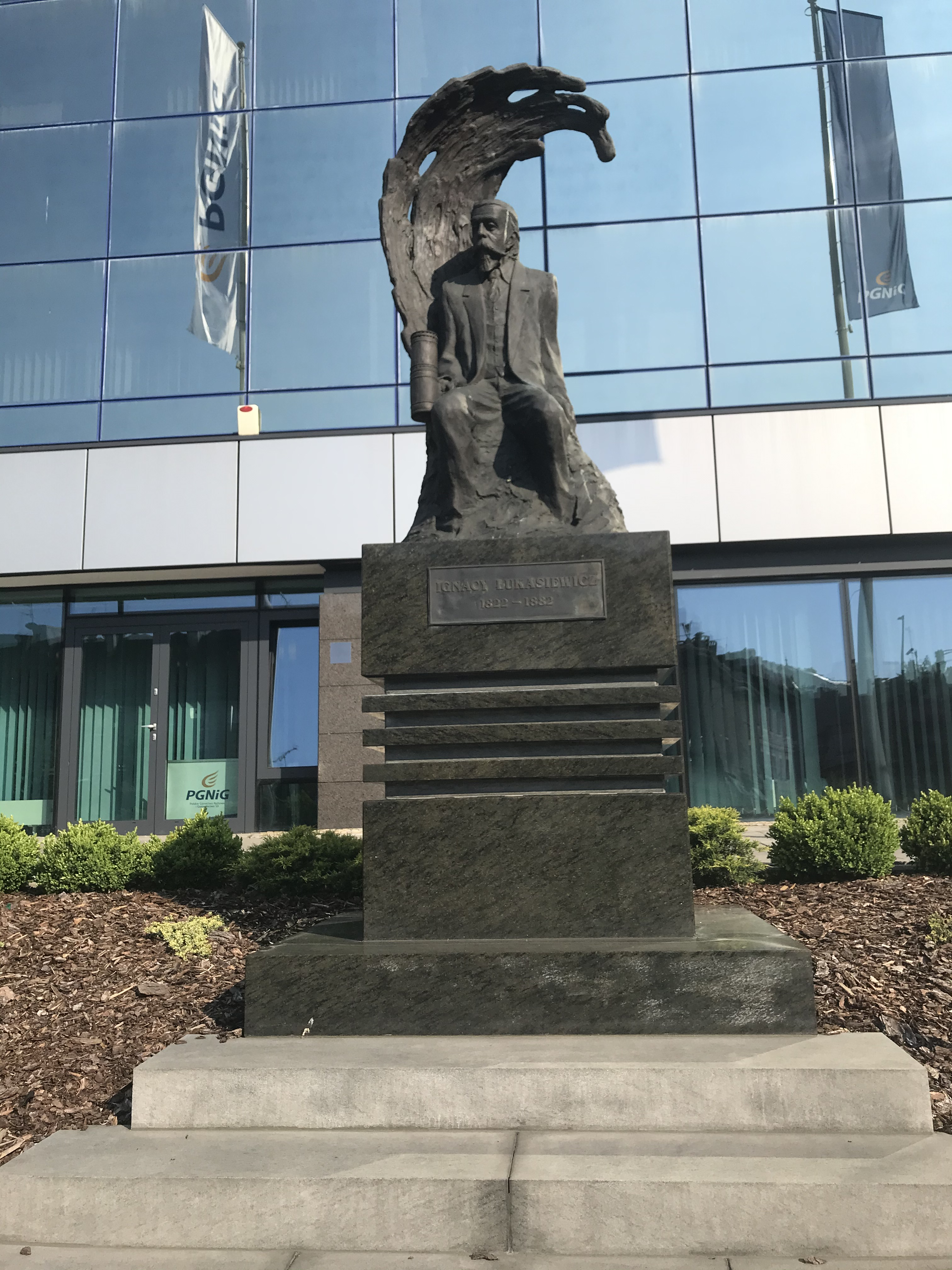
Ignacy Łukasiewicz Monument

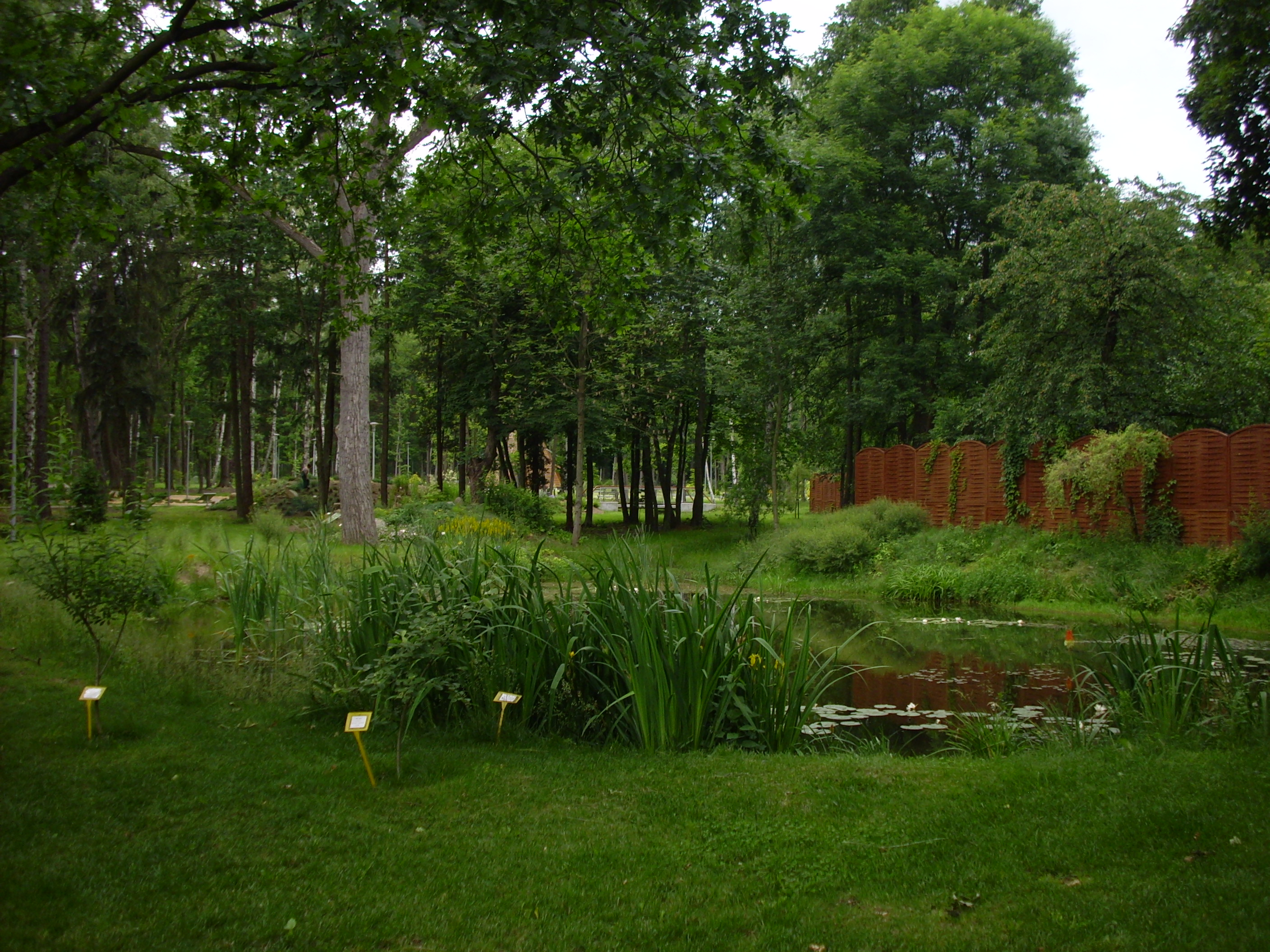
Botanical Garden

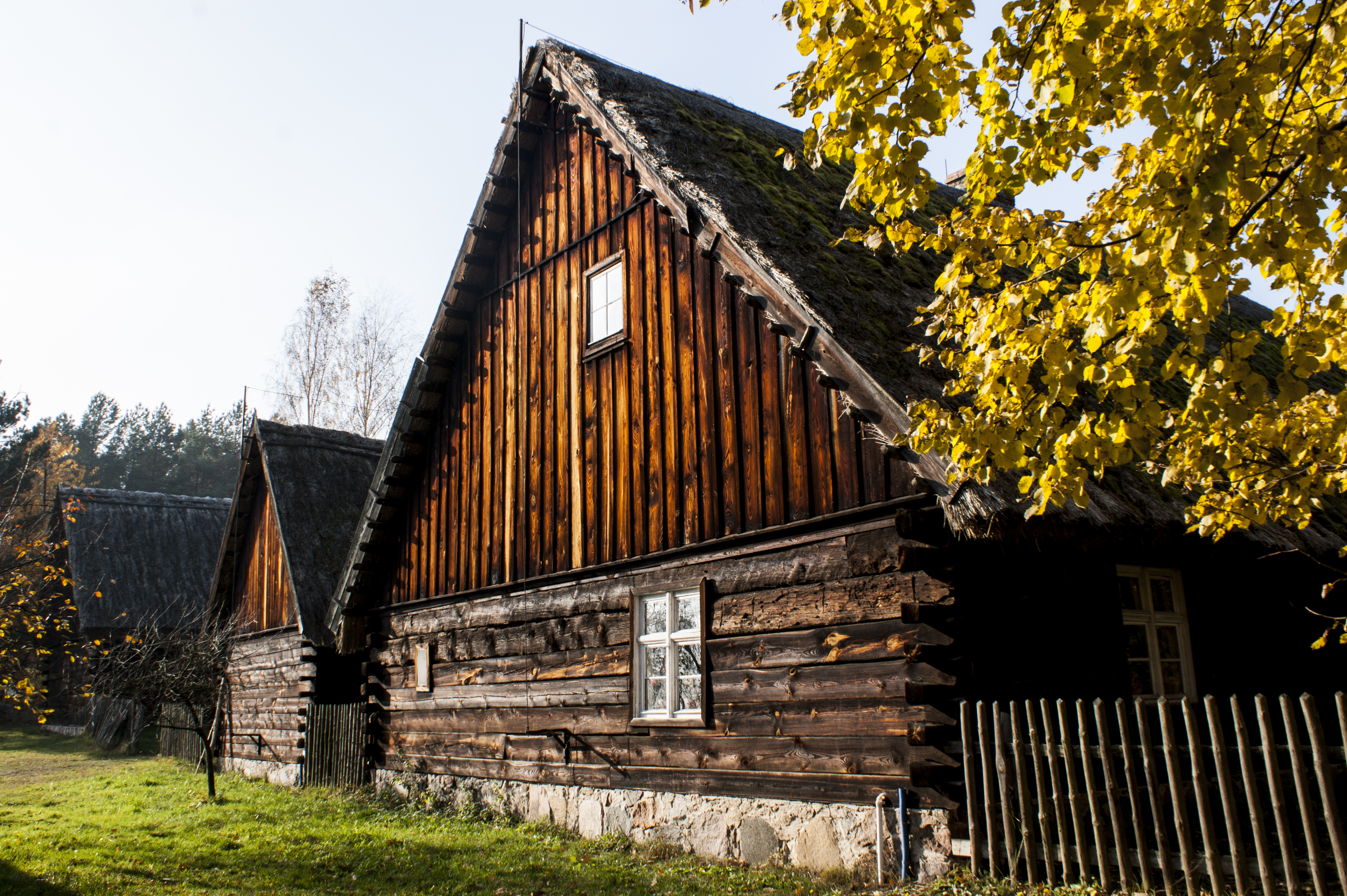
Ethnographic Open-Air Museum

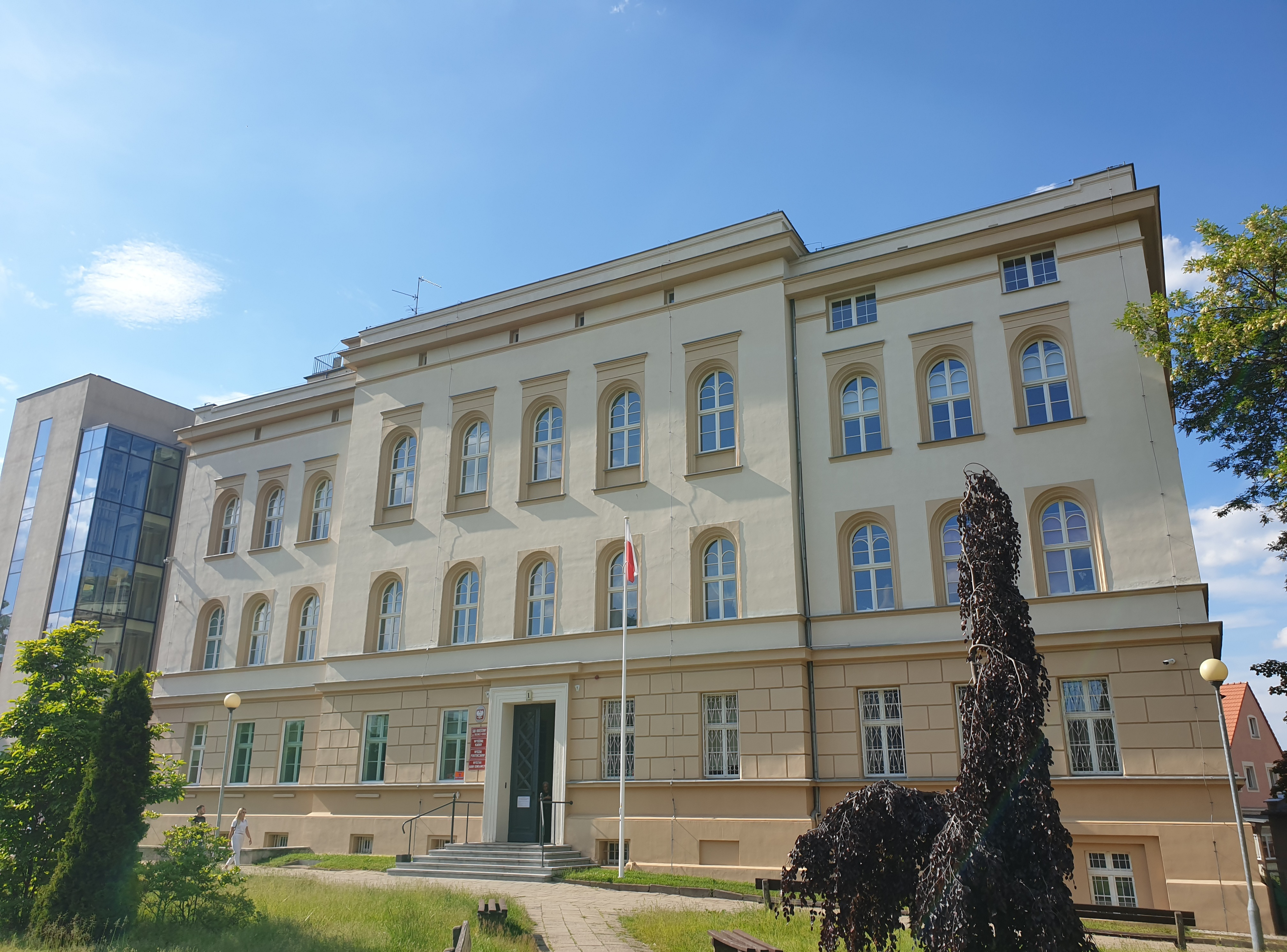
Courthouse

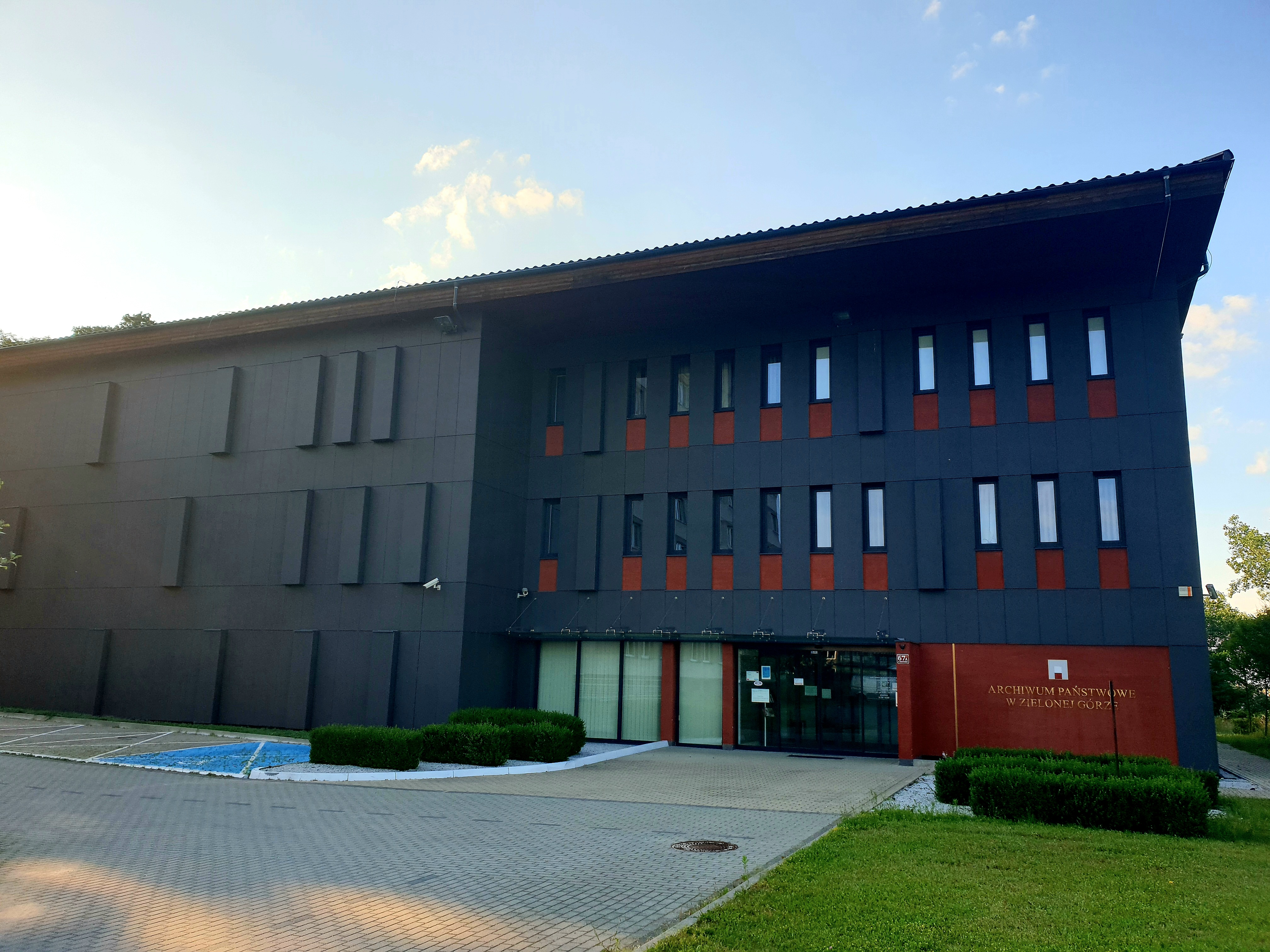
State Archives
