= Gmina Zielona Góra =

Gmina Zielona Góra Zielona Góra Commune
- Gmina
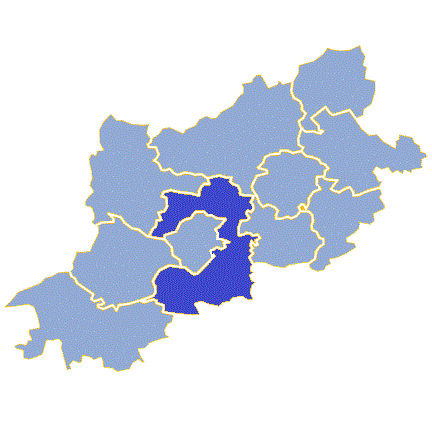
- Gmina Zielona Góra in Zielona Góra County

- Location within Poland
- Coordinates (Zielona Góra): 51°56′23″N 15°30′18″E
- Country: Poland
- Voivodeship: Lubusz
- County: Zielona Góra
- Seat: Zielona Góra

Area
  - Total: 220.45 km^{2} (85.12 sq mi)

Population (2011)
  - Total: 18,798
  - Density: 85.271/km^{2} (220.85/sq mi)
- Website: www.zielona-gora.pl

Gmina Zielona Góra was a rural gmina (administrative district) in Zielona Góra County, Lubusz Voivodeship, in western Poland. Its seat was the city of Zielona Góra. Since January 1, 2015 the gmina is a dzielnica of the city. The gmina covered an area of 220.45 square kilometres (85.1 sq mi), and as of 2011 its total population was 18,798.

== Villages ==
Gmina Zielona Góra contained the villages and settlements of Barcikowice, Barcikowiczki, Drzonków, Jany, Jarogniewice, Jeleniów, Kiełpin, Krępa, Krępa Mała, Łężyca, Ługowo, Nowy Kisielin, Ochla, Przydroże, Przylep, Racula, Stary Kisielin, Stożne, Sucha, Zatonie and Zawada.

== Neighbouring gminas ==
Gmina Zielona Góra was bordered by the city of Zielona Góra and by the gminas of Czerwieńsk, Kożuchów, Nowogród Bobrzański, Otyń, Sulechów, Świdnica, Trzebiechów and Zabór.
