= Popowice, Lubusz Voivodeship =

Popowice
- Village
- Location within Poland
- Coordinates: 51°45′28″N 15°15′45″E
- Country: Poland
- Voivodeship: Lubusz
- County: Zielona Góra
- Gmina: Nowogród Bobrzański
- Time zone: UTC+1 (CET)
  - Summer (DST): UTC+2 (CEST)
- Vehicle registration: FZI

Popowice [pɔpɔˈvit͡sɛ] is a village in the administrative district of Gmina Nowogród Bobrzański, within Zielona Góra County, Lubusz Voivodeship, in western Poland.

== History ==
The territory became a part of the emerging Polish state in the 10th century. In 1217, Duke Henry the Bearded granted Popowice to the Augustianian canons abbey in nearby Nowogród Bobrzański. The donation was later confirmed by bishop of Wrocław Tomasz I in 1263, and Silesian dukes in 1410.
