= Leśniów Mały =

- Village
- Location within Poland
- Coordinates: 52°1′N 15°17′E
- Country: Poland
- Voivodeship: Lubusz
- County: Zielona Góra
- Gmina: Czerwieńsk

Leśniów Mały [ˈlɛɕɲuf ˈmawɨ] (German: Klein-Lessen) is a village in the administrative district of Gmina Czerwieńsk, within Zielona Góra County, Lubusz Voivodeship, in western Poland.
