= Drągowina =

- Village
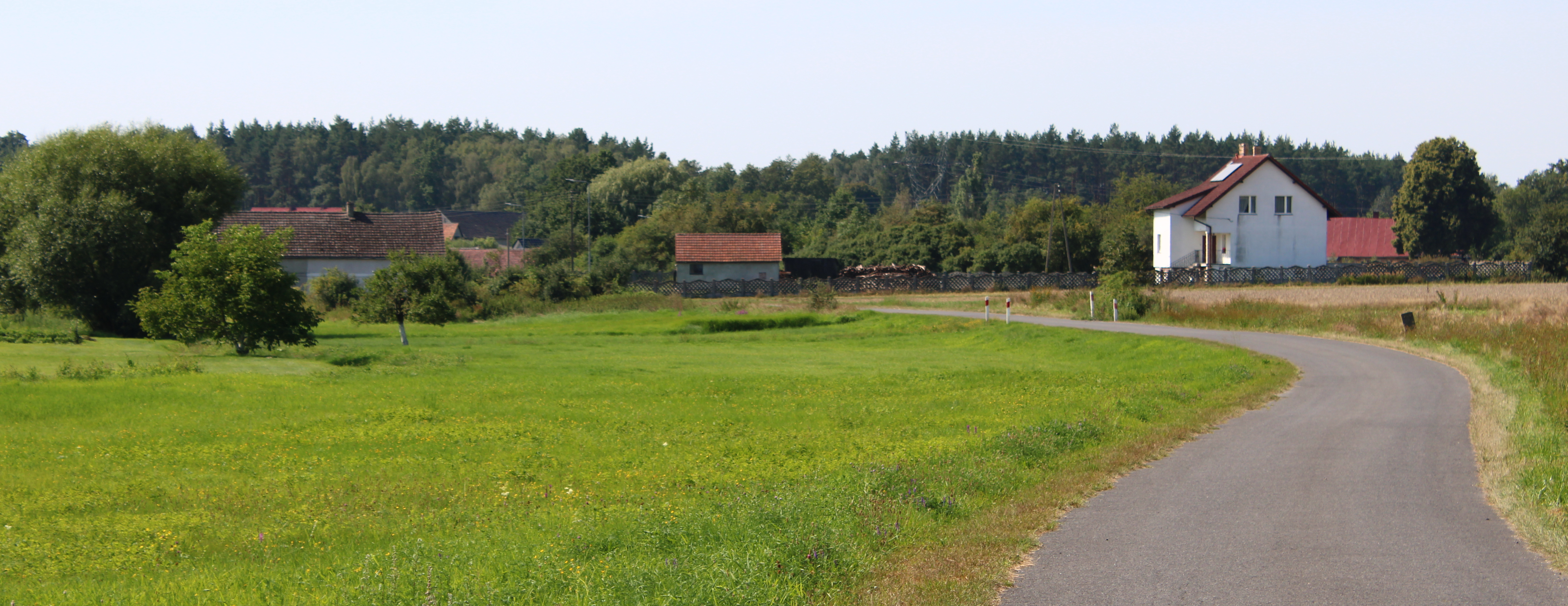

- Location within Poland
- Coordinates: 51°46′35″N 15°19′16″E
- Country: Poland
- Voivodeship: Lubusz
- County: Zielona Góra
- Gmina: Nowogród Bobrzański
- Population (approx.): 600
- Website: http://www.dragowina.info

Drągowina [drɔnɡɔˈvina] is a village in the administrative district of Gmina Nowogród Bobrzański, within Zielona Góra County, Lubusz Voivodeship, in western Poland.
