= Pielice, Zielona Góra County =

Village in Gmina Nowogród Bobrzański, Poland

Pielice
- Village
- Location within Poland
- Coordinates: 51°49′58″N 15°25′52″E
- Country: Poland
- Voivodeship: Lubusz
- County: Zielona Góra
- Gmina: Nowogród Bobrzański
- Population: 7

Pielice [pjɛˈlit͡sɛ] is a village in the administrative district of Gmina Nowogród Bobrzański, within Zielona Góra County, Lubusz Voivodeship, in western Poland.
