= Dobroszów Wielki =

- Village
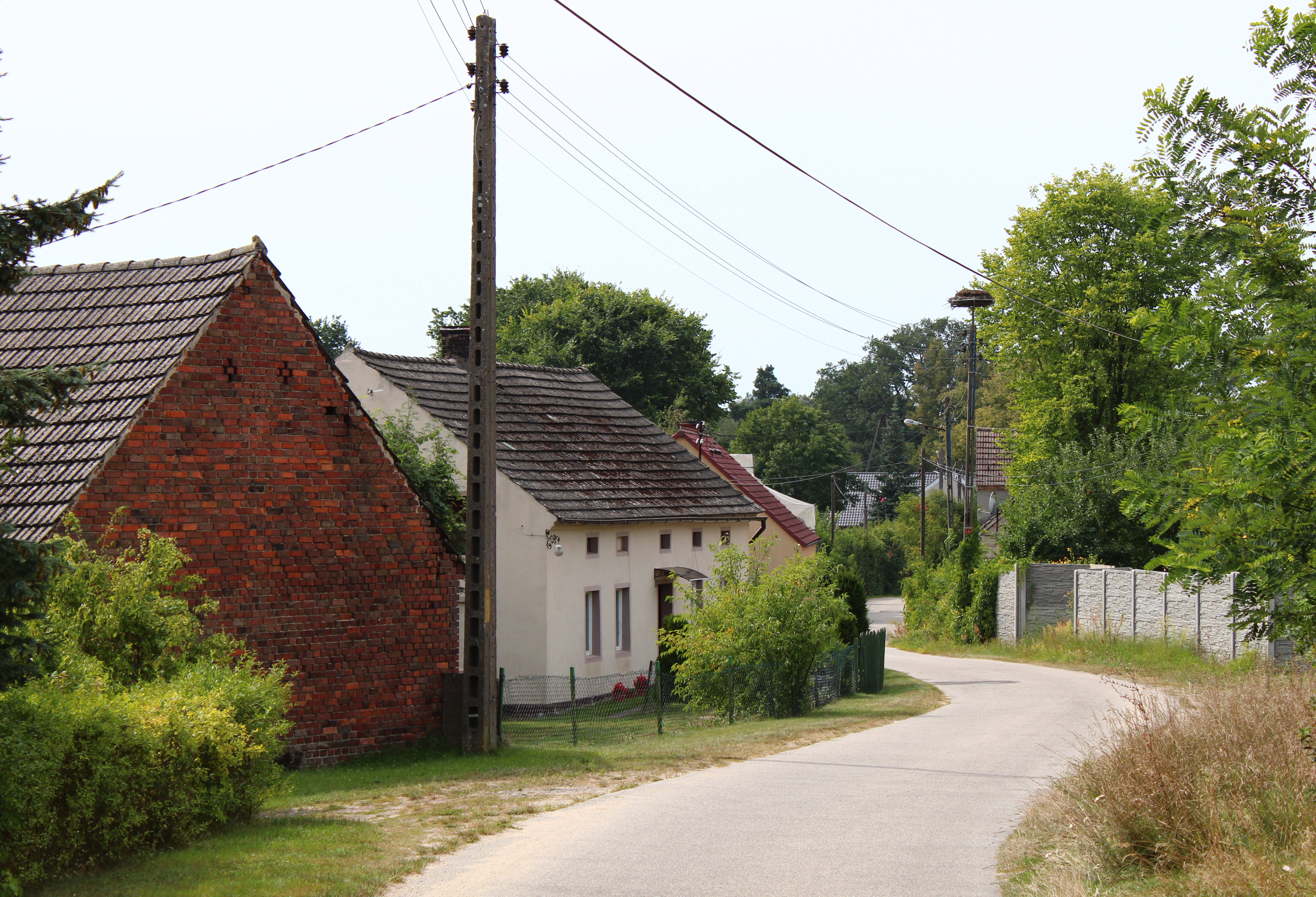

- Location within Poland
- Coordinates: 51°46′33″N 15°15′38″E
- Country: Poland
- Voivodeship: Lubusz
- County: Zielona Góra
- Gmina: Nowogród Bobrzański

Dobroszów Wielki (Polish pronunciation: [dɔˈbrɔʂuv ˈvjɛlkʲi]) is a village in the administrative district of Gmina Nowogród Bobrzański, within Zielona Góra County, Lubusz Voivodeship, in western Poland.
