= Nietkowice =

- Village
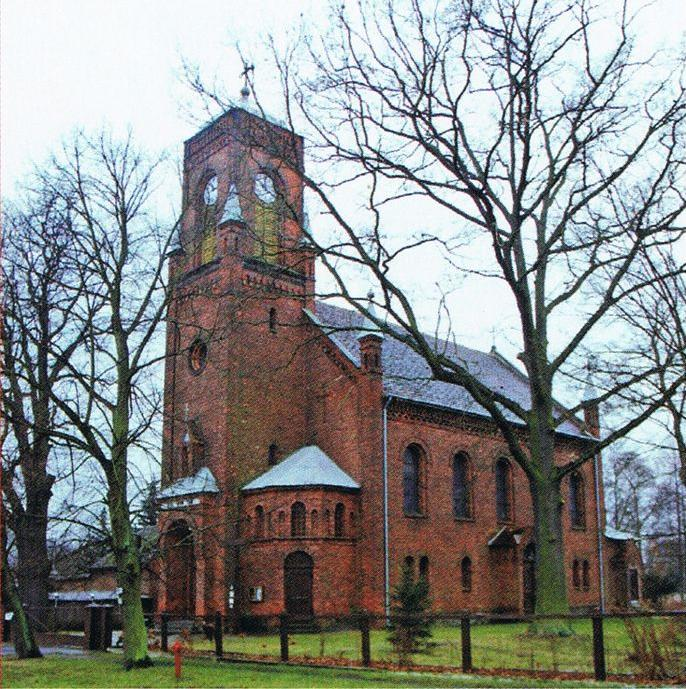
- Church of the Sacred Heart

- Location within Poland
- Coordinates: 52°4′N 15°22′E
- Country: Poland
- Voivodeship: Lubusz
- County: Zielona Góra
- Gmina: Czerwieńsk

Population
  - Total: 700

Nietkowice [ɲɛtkɔˈvit͡sɛ] (German: Deutsch Nettkow) is a village in the administrative district of Gmina Czerwieńsk, within Zielona Góra County, Lubusz Voivodeship, in western Poland.
