= Karczemka, Lubusz Voivodeship =

Karczemka
- Village
- Location within Poland
- Coordinates: 51°56′22″N 15°48′6″E
- Country: Poland
- Voivodeship: Lubusz
- County: Zielona Góra
- Gmina: Bojadła

Karczemka [karˈt͡ʂɛmka] is a village in the administrative district of Gmina Bojadła, within Zielona Góra County, Lubusz Voivodeship, in western Poland.
