= Turów, Lubusz Voivodeship =

Turów
- Village
- Location within Poland
- Coordinates: 51°49′N 15°14′E
- Country: Poland
- Voivodeship: Lubusz
- County: Zielona Góra
- Gmina: Nowogród Bobrzański

Turów [ˈturuf] is a village in the administrative district of Gmina Nowogród Bobrzański, within Zielona Góra County, Lubusz Voivodeship, in western Poland.
