= Pierzwin =

Village in Lubusz Voivodeship, western Poland

- Village
- Location within Poland
- Coordinates: 51°49′10″N 15°26′10″E
- Country: Poland
- Voivodeship: Lubusz
- County: Zielona Góra
- Gmina: Nowogród Bobrzański
- Population: 64

Pierzwin [ˈpjɛʐvin] is a village in the administrative district of Gmina Nowogród Bobrzański, within Zielona Góra County, Lubusz Voivodeship, in western Poland.
