= Sosnówka, Lubusz Voivodeship =

Sosnówka
- Village
- Location within Poland
- Coordinates: 51°58′9″N 15°50′44″E
- Country: Poland
- Voivodeship: Lubusz
- County: Zielona Góra
- Gmina: Bojadła
- Time zone: UTC+1 (CET)
  - Summer (DST): UTC+2 (CEST)
- Vehicle registration: FZI
- Primary airport: Zielona Góra Airport

Sosnówka [sɔsˈnufka] is a village in the administrative district of Gmina Bojadła, within Zielona Góra County, Lubusz Voivodeship, in western Poland.

The name of the village is of Polish origin and comes from the word sosna which means "pine".
