= Bogaczów, Zielona Góra County =

Bogaczów
- Village
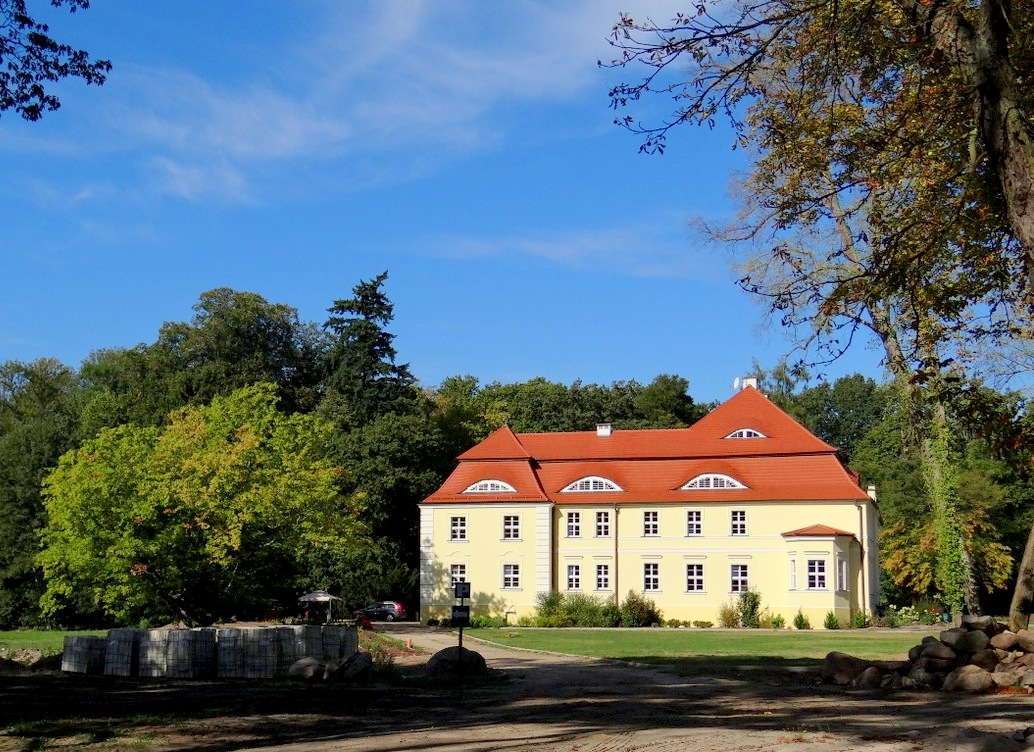
- Manor

- Location within Poland
- Coordinates: 51°51′N 15°15′E
- Country: Poland
- Voivodeship: Lubusz
- County: Zielona Góra
- Gmina: Nowogród Bobrzański

Bogaczów [bɔˈɡat͡ʂuf] is a village in the administrative district of Gmina Nowogród Bobrzański, within Zielona Góra County, Lubusz Voivodeship, in western Poland.
