= Dobrzęcin =

- Village
- Location within Poland
- Coordinates: 52°2′N 15°26′E
- Country: Poland
- Voivodeship: Lubusz
- County: Zielona Góra
- Gmina: Czerwieńsk

Dobrzęcin [dɔˈbʐɛnt͡ɕin] is a village in the administrative district of Gmina Czerwieńsk, within Zielona Góra County, Lubusz Voivodeship, in western Poland.
