= Kamionka, Lubusz Voivodeship =

Kamionka
- Village
- Location within Poland
- Coordinates: 51°48′N 15°27′E
- Country: Poland
- Voivodeship: Lubusz
- County: Zielona Góra
- Gmina: Nowogród Bobrzański

Kamionka [kaˈmjɔnka] is a village in the administrative district of Gmina Nowogród Bobrzański, within Zielona Góra County, Lubusz Voivodeship, in western Poland.
