= Bródki, Lubusz Voivodeship =

Bródki
- Village
- Location within Poland
- Coordinates: 52°4′14″N 15°23′40″E
- Country: Poland
- Voivodeship: Lubusz
- County: Zielona Góra
- Gmina: Czerwieńsk
- Population: 128

Bródki [ˈbrutki] is a village in the administrative district of Gmina Czerwieńsk, within Zielona Góra County, Lubusz Voivodeship, in western Poland.
