= Pyrnik =

- Village
- Location within Poland
- Coordinates: 51°55′N 15°48′E
- Country: Poland
- Voivodeship: Lubusz
- County: Zielona Góra
- Gmina: Bojadła

Pyrnik [ˈpɨrnik] is a village in the administrative district of Gmina Bojadła, within Zielona Góra County, Lubusz Voivodeship, in western Poland.
