= Wysoka, Zielona Góra County =

Wysoka
- Village
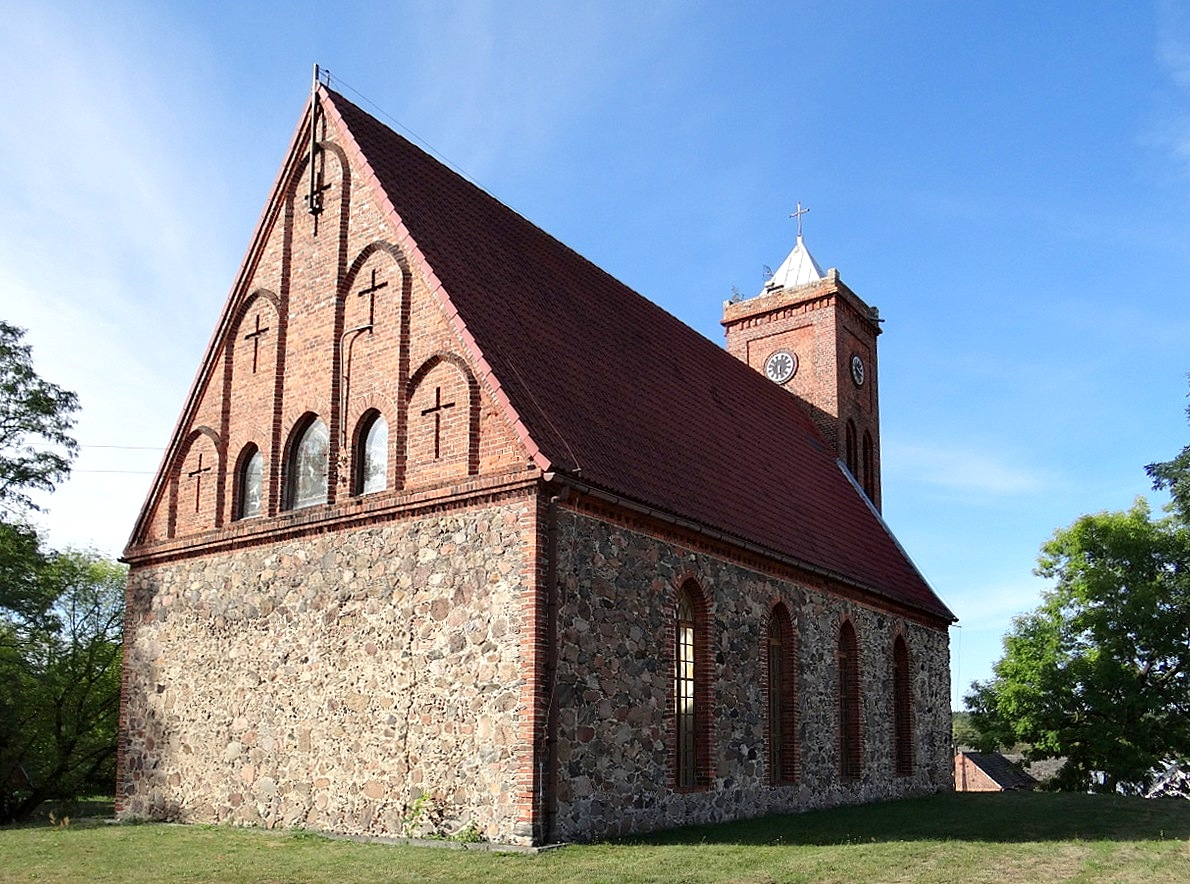
- Saint Therese church in Wysoka

- Location within Poland
- Coordinates: 51°52′N 15°11′E
- Country: Poland
- Voivodeship: Lubusz
- County: Zielona Góra
- Gmina: Nowogród Bobrzański
- Time zone: UTC+1 (CET)
  - Summer (DST): UTC+2 (CEST)
- Vehicle registration: FZI

Wysoka [vɨˈsɔka] is a village in the administrative district of Gmina Nowogród Bobrzański, within Zielona Góra County, Lubusz Voivodeship, in western Poland.

The name of the village is of Polish origin and comes from the word wysoka, which means "high", referring to the elevation of the village.

== Monuments ==
The branch church of St. Teresa of the Child Jesus was built of stone with the addition of brick and bog iron, probably in the 14th century. At the end of the 19th century, the church was rebuilt. At that time, the window openings were modified and a square brick tower with a clock and gables were erected. The rectangular body is covered with a gable roof. Window panes with an outline resembling window openings decorate the eastern brick gable wall. In the interior, covered with a ceiling, a gallery supported by two wooden pillars has been preserved, and of the original furnishings, a stone Renaissance baptismal font from 1611 has survived. On the external southern façade, there is a tombstone from the turn of the 17th and 18th centuries.

== Demography ==
In 1840 Wysoka had 63 houses and 513 inhabitants. Number of inhabitants of the town in particular years:

Year	Number of inhabitants
1840	513
1998	137
2002	136
2009	133
2011	133
2021	124
