= Cieszów =

Cieszów may refer to the following places in Poland:

- Cieszów, Lower Silesian Voivodeship (south-west Poland)
- Cieszów, Lubusz Voivodeship (west Poland)
