= Zagórze, Zielona Góra County =

Zagórze
- Village
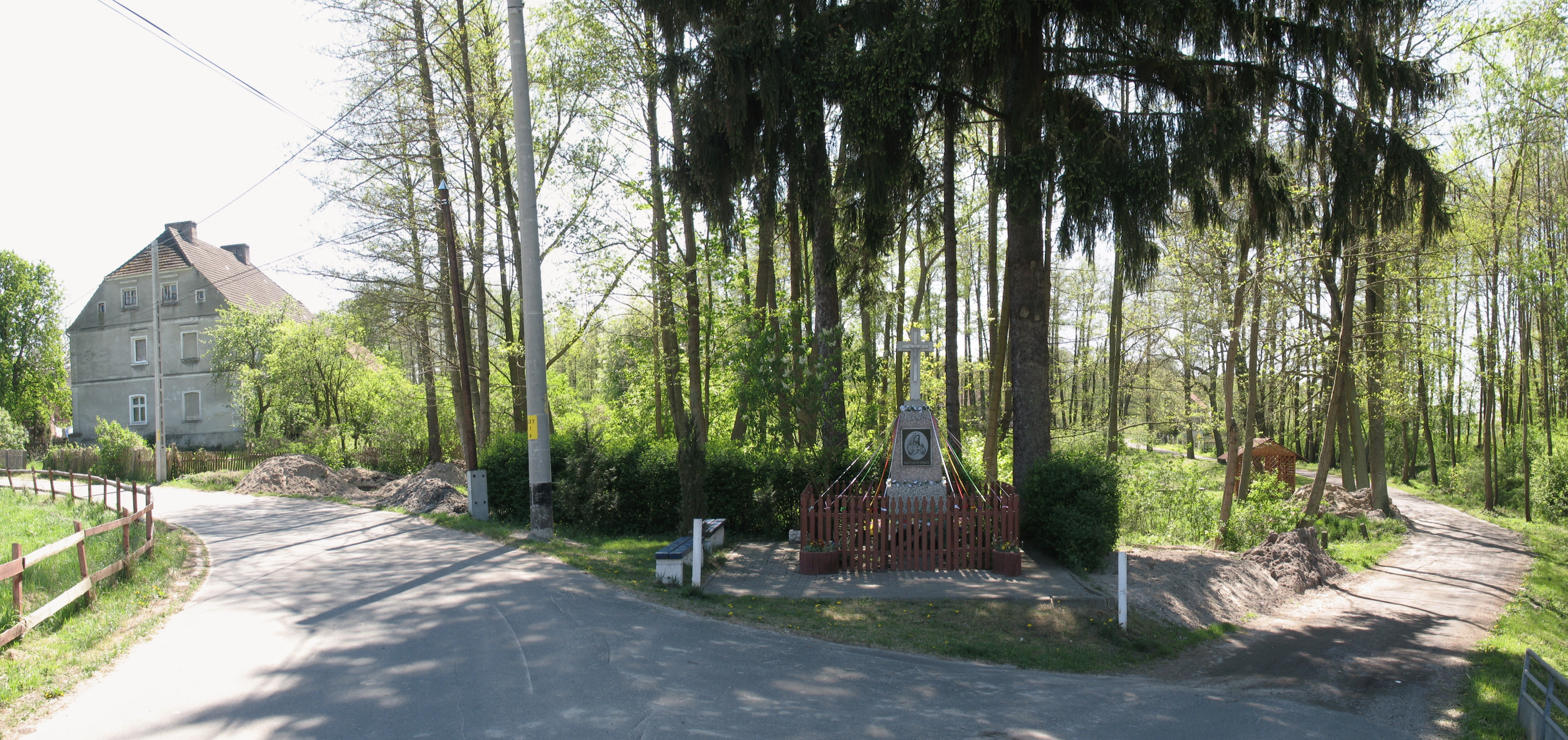

- Location within Poland
- Coordinates: 51°58′N 15°24′E
- Country: Poland
- Voivodeship: Lubusz
- County: Zielona Góra
- Gmina: Czerwieńsk
- Population: 113

Zagórze [zaˈɡuʐɛ] is a village in the administrative district of Gmina Czerwieńsk, within Zielona Góra County, Lubusz Voivodeship, in western Poland.
