= Będów =

- Village
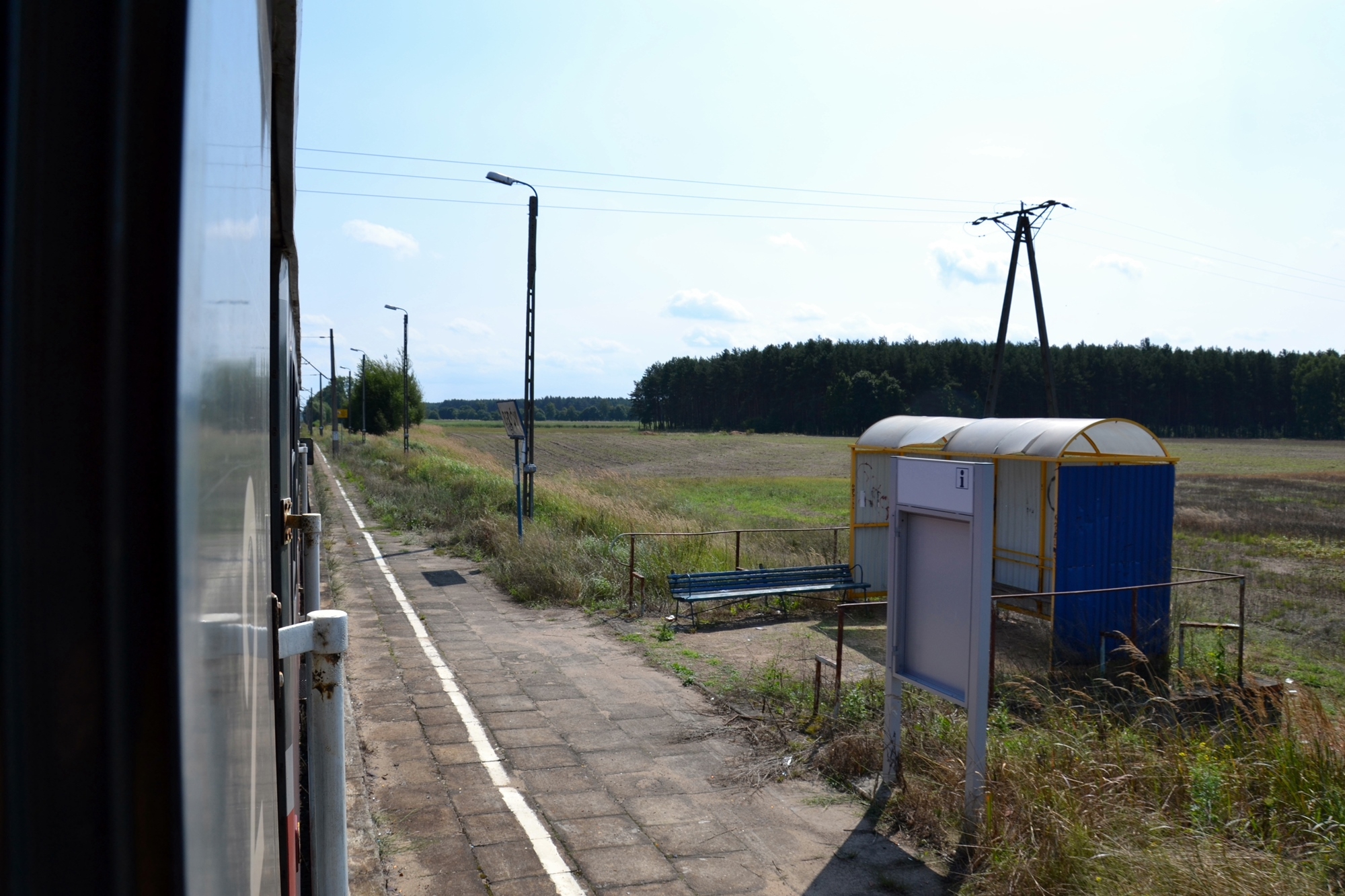
- Railway station

- Location within Poland
- Coordinates: 52°4′N 15°18′E
- Country: Poland
- Voivodeship: Lubusz
- County: Zielona Góra
- Gmina: Czerwieńsk

Będów [ˈbɛnduf] is a village in the administrative district of Gmina Czerwieńsk, within Zielona Góra County, Lubusz Voivodeship, in western Poland.
