= Siadcza, Lubusz Voivodeship =

Siadcza
- Village
- Location within Poland
- Coordinates: 52°0′N 15°51′E
- Country: Poland
- Voivodeship: Lubusz
- County: Zielona Góra
- Gmina: Bojadła

Siadcza [ˈɕatt͡ʂa] is a village in the administrative district of Gmina Bojadła, within Zielona Góra County, Lubusz Voivodeship, in western Poland.
