= Dobroszów Mały =

- Village
- Location within Poland
- Coordinates: 51°45′37″N 15°14′37″E
- Country: Poland
- Voivodeship: Lubusz
- County: Zielona Góra
- Gmina: Nowogród Bobrzański

Dobroszów Mały [dɔˈbrɔʂuf ˈmawɨ] is a village in the administrative district of Gmina Nowogród Bobrzański, within Zielona Góra County, Lubusz Voivodeship, in western Poland.
