= Sterków =

- Village
- Location within Poland
- Coordinates: 51°51′N 15°13′E
- Country: Poland
- Voivodeship: Lubusz
- County: Zielona Góra
- Gmina: Nowogród Bobrzański

Sterków [ˈstɛrkuf] is a village in the administrative district of Gmina Nowogród Bobrzański, within Zielona Góra County, Lubusz Voivodeship, in western Poland.
