= Susłów =

Village in Lubusz Voivodeship, Poland

- Village
- Location within Poland
- Coordinates: 51°59′33″N 15°52′46″E
- Country: Poland
- Voivodeship: Lubusz
- County: Zielona Góra
- Gmina: Bojadła

Susłów [ˈsuswuf] is a village in the administrative district of Gmina Bojadła, within Zielona Góra County, Lubusz Voivodeship, in western Poland.
