= Sycowice =

- Village
- Location within Poland
- Coordinates: 52°6′N 15°19′E
- Country: Poland
- Voivodeship: Lubusz
- County: Zielona Góra
- Gmina: Czerwieńsk
- Population: 275

Sycowice [sɨt͡sɔˈvit͡sɛ] is a village in the administrative district of Gmina Czerwieńsk, within Zielona Góra County, Lubusz Voivodeship, in western Poland.
