= Płoty, Lubusz Voivodeship =

Village in Gmina Czerwieńsk, Poland

Płoty
- Village
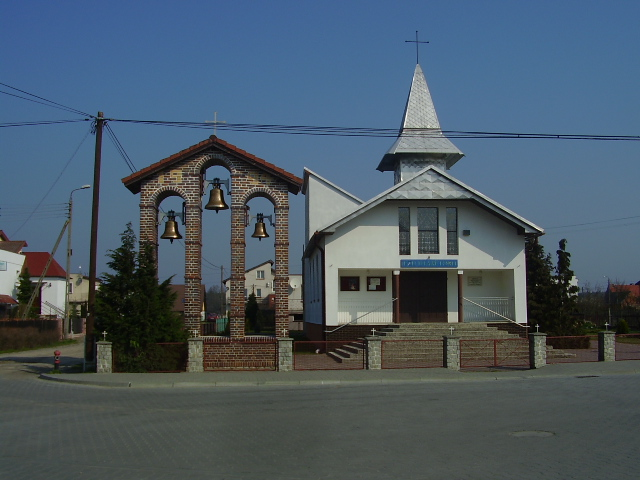
- Catholic church

- Location within Poland
- Coordinates: 51°59′20″N 15°24′46″E
- Country: Poland
- Voivodeship: Lubusz
- County: Zielona Góra
- Gmina: Czerwieńsk
- Population: 786

Płoty [ˈpwɔtɨ] is a village in the administrative district of Gmina Czerwieńsk, within Zielona Góra County, Lubusz Voivodeship, in western Poland.
