= Theodor Nette =

Soviet diplomatic courier (1895–1926)

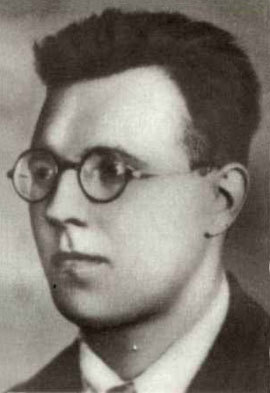

Theodor Ivanovich Nette (Russian: Теодор Иванович Нетте, born 1895 or 1896 – died February 5, 1926, Moscow-Riga train, Latvia) was a Soviet diplomatic courier of NKID, who died in a terrorist attack on the Soviet train while delivering diplomatic mail to Berlin. Vladimir Mayakovsky published a poem praising his death – "To Comrade Nette, the Man and the Ship" (1926) saying he wants to die like Nette.

== Biography ==
Born in Latvia (possible version). Son of the shoemaker. Learned German. Joined the Social Democratic Party when he was 17. After World War I both him and his father were arrested. Imprisoned at Riga Central, later transported to Nowogród bobrzański Krzywaniec . Released in March 1917 and returned to Latvia. Official version says that he worked underground since August 1917 when German troops occupied Riga.

Since the beginning of 1918 worked in Petrograd as the secretary of the visa department of RSFSR Narkomindel, later became a politcommissar of the second battalion of the 1st Red Latvian Riflemen regiment. After Soviet Latvia was declared in 1919 he was appointed as Chairman of the Jelgava revolutionary tribunal. Participated in the Civil War Southern Front. Since 1922 he became an official diplomatic courier of RSFSR Narkomindel.

On February 5, 1926, Moscow – Riga train was assaulted between the Ikšķile and Salaspils station. Armed men required the trainman to show courier's compartment and attacked the Soviet trade representative Pecherskiy. Nette and his partner Johann Mahmastal (1891–1942) took their guns but failed to close the door. Nette shot first and hits one attacker, but was instantly killed by a headshot. Mahmastal was wounded in the abdomen and right arm. Two attackers were also wounded and retreated (they were later found dead), while at least one could escape. Mahmastal stayed in the coupe and guarded the diplomatic cargo until Riga, where USSR Plenipotentiary Officers arrived.

Buried at Vagankovo.

== Legacy ==
The attacks echoed wide around the USSR.

- A year after the tragic events Alexander Dovzhenko releases a film The Diplomatic Pouch (Russian: Сумка дипкурьера, 1927).
- Nette was posthumously awarded with the Order of the Red Banner together with his wounded colleague Iogann Mahmastal
- The steamship Tver was renamed in his honour (which in turn inspired the Mayakovsky's poem). Later his name was given to the two ships of the Soviet Northern Sea Steamship Line (Sovtorgflot) consequently – gas-turbine ship of 1963 and the timber ship of 1990 (Pavlin Vinogradov class was similar to the Iogann Mahmastal timber ship (currently, Northern Shipping Company). Currently, no ship bears his name.
- Nette's daughter, who was only 1-year old at time of father's death, was cared by State.
- February 5 became an official remembrance day of fallen diplomatic couriers.
- Odessa Film released a film in 1977 named Red Dipcouriers based on the story of the attack on Nette and Mahmastal.
- The man and the [steam]ship became a strong cliché in Russia after use by Eduard Uspensky's novel Winter in Prostokvashino and in subsequent animation film (in the form of Kruzenshtern, the man and the ship, 1984). In general, the expression refers to someone with 'gravitas'.
