= Sudoł =

Sudół
- Village
- Location within Poland
- Coordinates: 51°59′33″N 15°20′49″E
- Country: Poland
- Voivodeship: Lubusz
- County: Zielona Góra
- Gmina: Czerwieńsk
- Population: 144

Sudoł [ˈsudɔu̯] is a village in the administrative district of Gmina Czerwieńsk, within Zielona Góra County, Lubusz Voivodeship, in western Poland.
