= Leśniów Wielki =

- Village
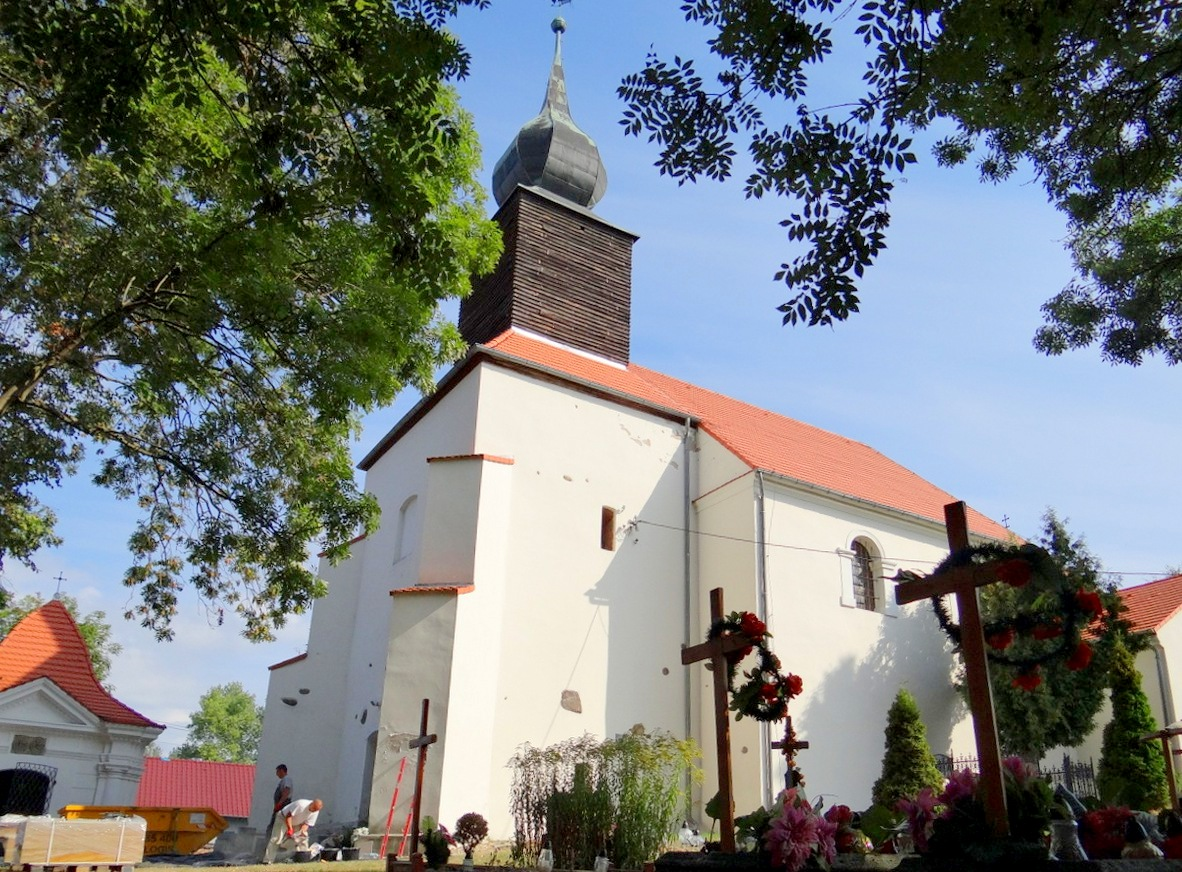
- Church of the Assumption of the Virgin Mary

- Location within Poland
- Coordinates: 51°59′12″N 15°18′38″E
- Country: Poland
- Voivodeship: Lubusz
- County: Zielona Góra
- Gmina: Czerwieńsk
- Elevation: 19 m (62 ft)

Population
  - Total: 536

Leśniów Wielki (Polish pronunciation: [ˈlɛɕɲuv ˈvjɛlkʲi], German: Groß-Lessen) is a village in the administrative district of Gmina Czerwieńsk, within Zielona Góra County, Lubusz Voivodeship, in western Poland.
