= Podgórzyce, Lubusz Voivodeship =

Podgórzyce
- Village
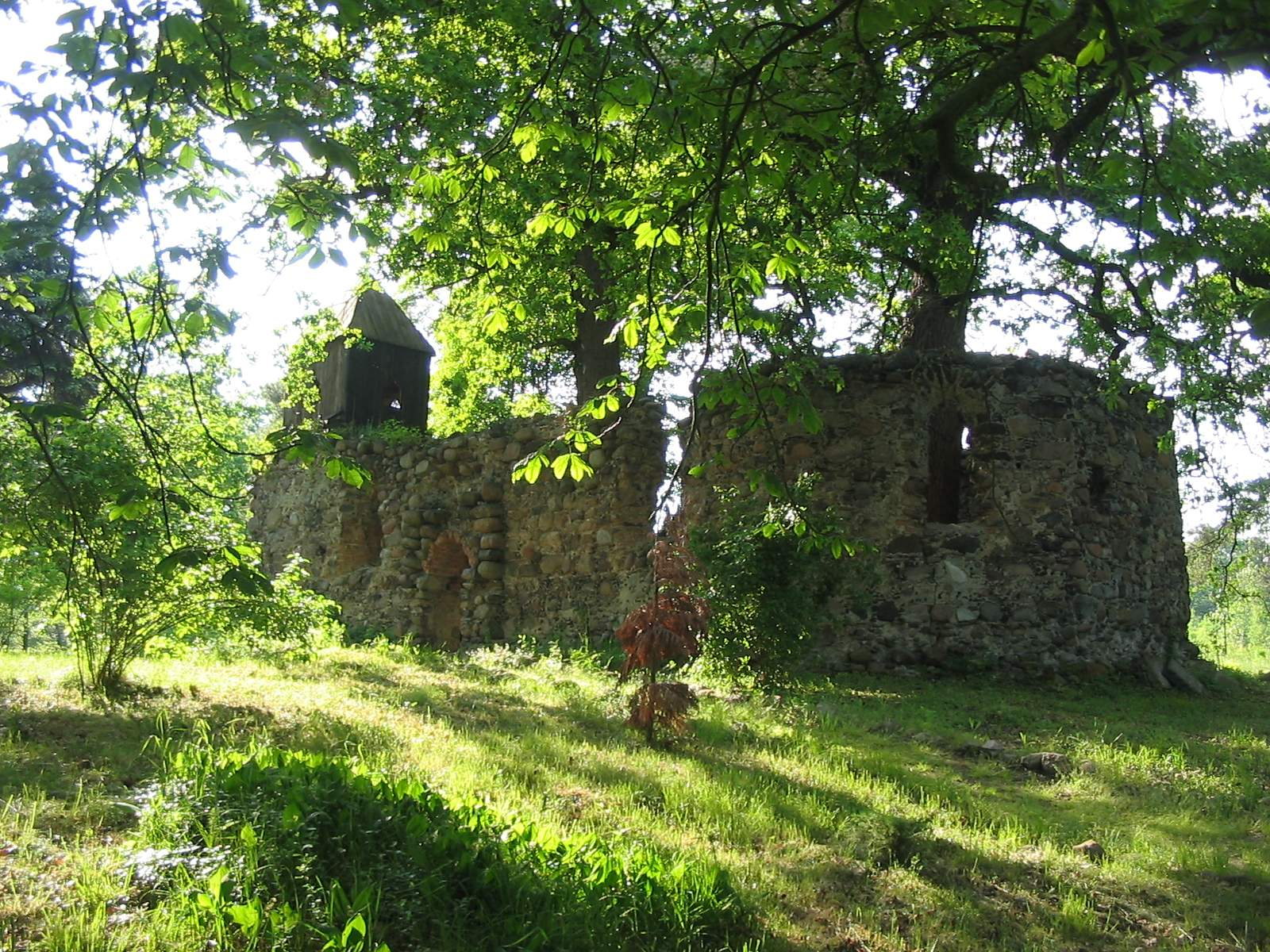
- Podgorzyce church

- Location within Poland
- Coordinates: 51°50′33″N 15°12′53″E
- Country: Poland
- Voivodeship: Lubusz
- County: Zielona Góra
- Gmina: Nowogród Bobrzański
- Population: 100

Podgórzyce [pɔdɡuˈʐɨt͡sɛ] is a village in the administrative district of Gmina Nowogród Bobrzański, within Zielona Góra County, Lubusz Voivodeship, in western Poland.
