= Pajęczno, Lubusz Voivodeship =

Pajęczno
- Village
- Location within Poland
- Coordinates: 51°52′44″N 15°12′53″E
- Country: Poland
- Voivodeship: Lubusz
- County: Zielona Góra
- Gmina: Nowogród Bobrzański

Pajęczno [paˈjɛnt͡ʂnɔ] is a village in the administrative district of Gmina Nowogród Bobrzański, within Zielona Góra County, Lubusz Voivodeship, in western Poland.
