= Klępina =

- Village
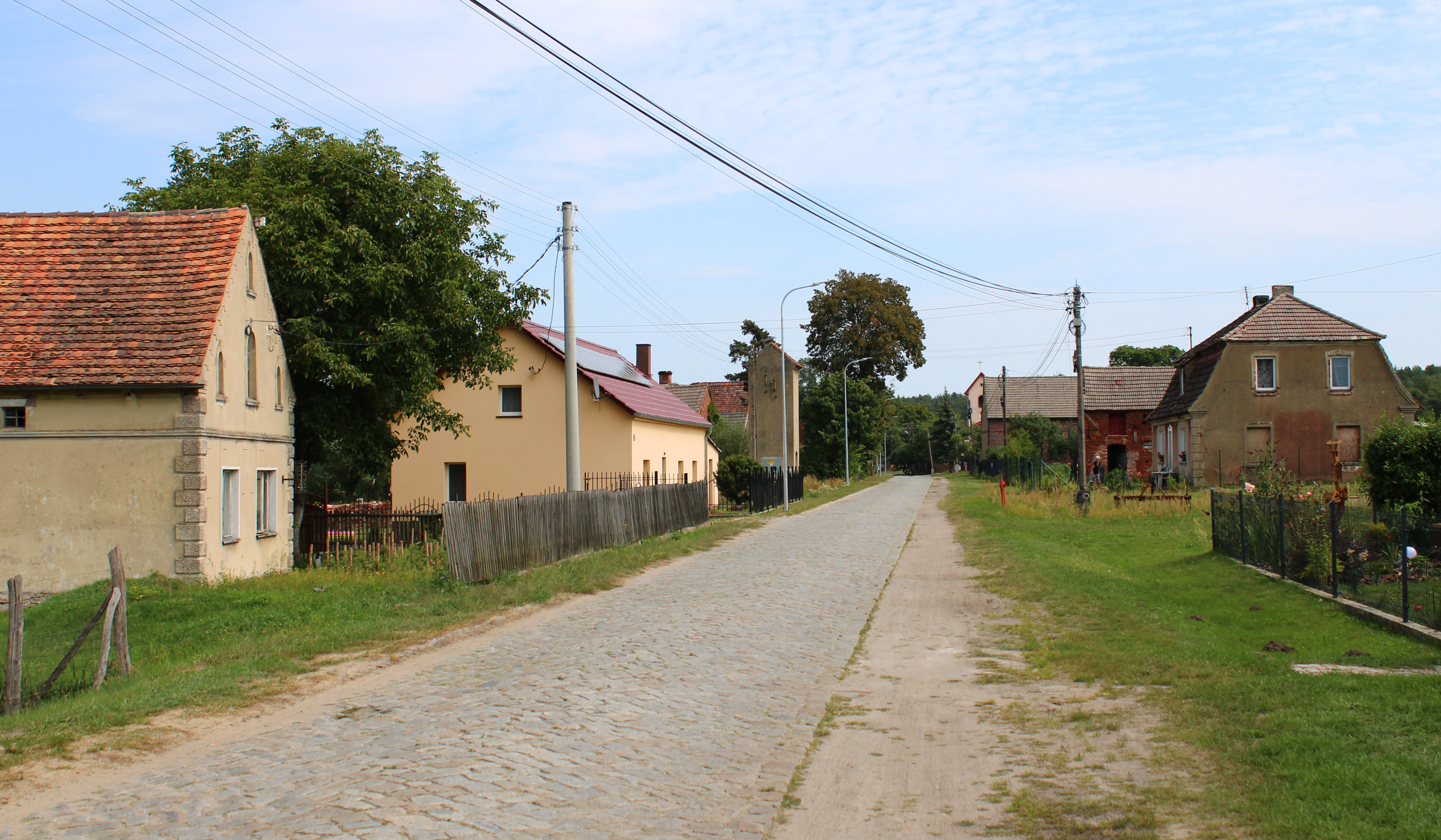

- Location within Poland
- Coordinates: 51°48′N 15°17′E
- Country: Poland
- Voivodeship: Lubusz
- County: Zielona Góra
- Gmina: Nowogród Bobrzański

Klępina [klɛmˈpina] is a village in the administrative district of Gmina Nowogród Bobrzański, in Zielona Góra County, Lubusz Voivodeship, in western Poland.
