= Kotowice, Lubusz Voivodeship =

Kotowice
- Village
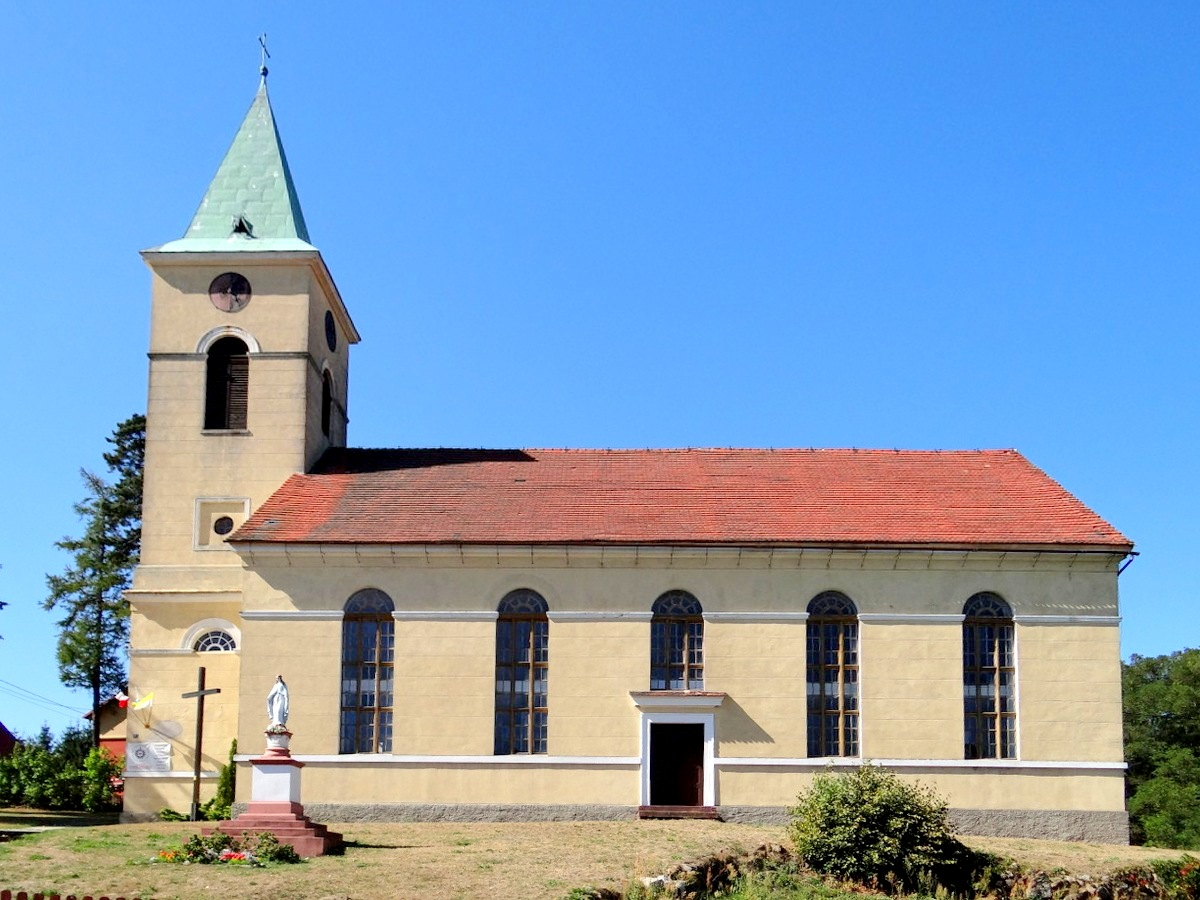
- Catholic church

- Location within Poland
- Coordinates: 51°48′N 15°21′E
- Country: Poland
- Voivodeship: Lubusz
- County: Zielona Góra
- Gmina: Nowogród Bobrzański

Kotowice [kɔtɔˈvit͡sɛ] is a village in the administrative district of Gmina Nowogród Bobrzański, within Zielona Góra County, Lubusz Voivodeship, in western Poland.
