= Krzywa, Lubusz Voivodeship =

Krzywa
- Village
- Location within Poland
- Coordinates: 51°50′29″N 15°11′10″E
- Country: Poland
- Voivodeship: Lubusz
- County: Zielona Góra
- Gmina: Nowogród Bobrzański

Krzywa [ˈkʂɨva] is a village in the administrative district of Gmina Nowogród Bobrzański, within Zielona Góra County, Lubusz Voivodeship, in western Poland.
