= Zatonie =

- Village
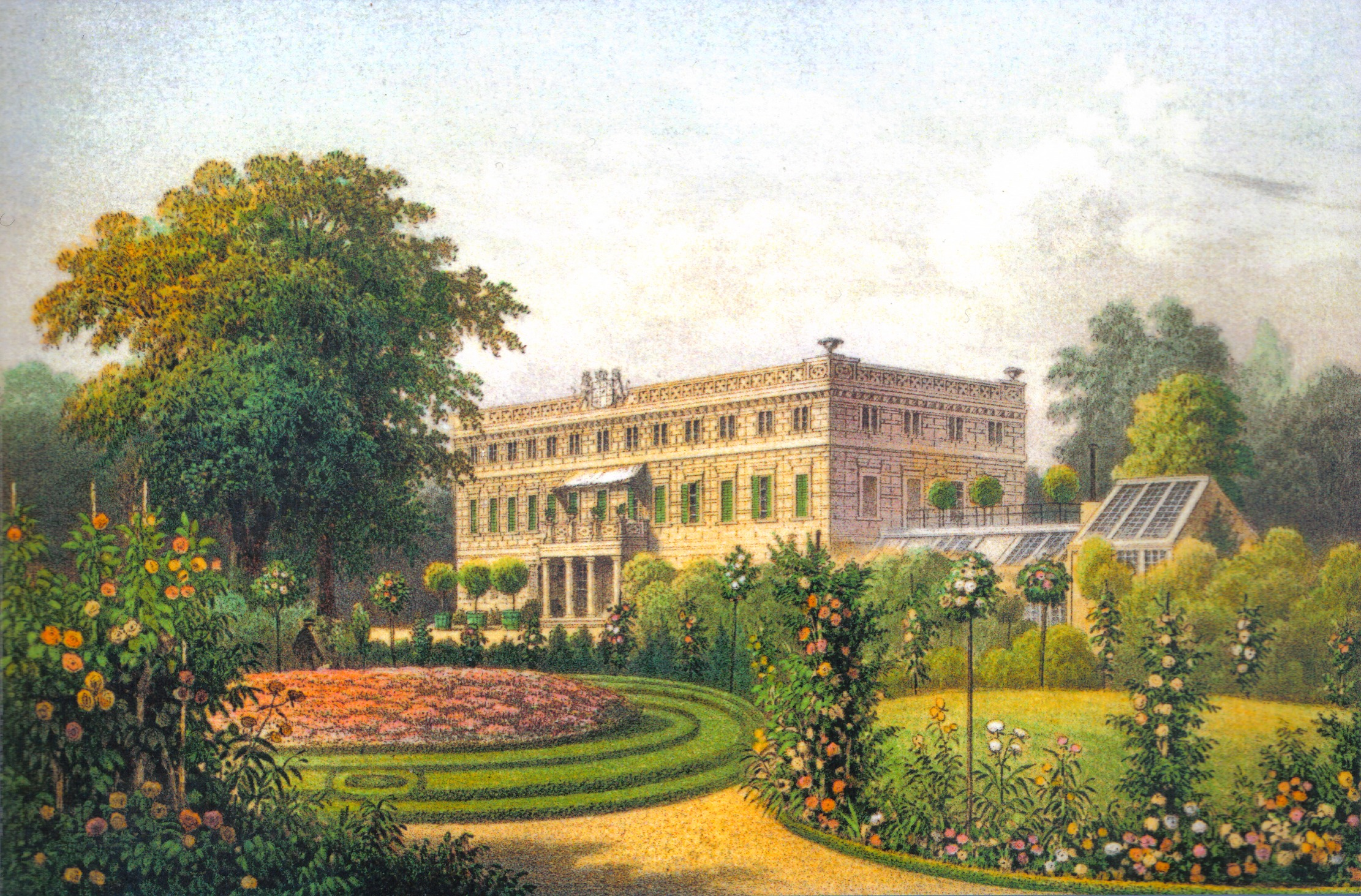
- 19th-century palace in Zatonie

- Location within Poland
- Coordinates: 51°52′N 15°34′E
- Country: Poland
- Voivodeship: Lubusz
- County: Zielona Góra County
- Gmina: Gmina Zielona Góra
- Population: 392

Zatonie [zaˈtɔɲɛ] is a village in the administrative district of Gmina Zielona Góra, within Zielona Góra County, Lubusz Voivodeship, in western Poland. It lies approximately 10 km (6 mi) south-east of Zielona Góra.

Formerly a part of the Duchy of Sagan, the village has existed since the 13th century. It became a significant political and cultural centre of the region in the middle of the 19th century when the palace in Günthersdorf was inherited by Princess Dorothea of Courland. After 1945, the region became Polish and was given its current name.
