= Sobolice, Zielona Góra County =

Sobolice
- Village
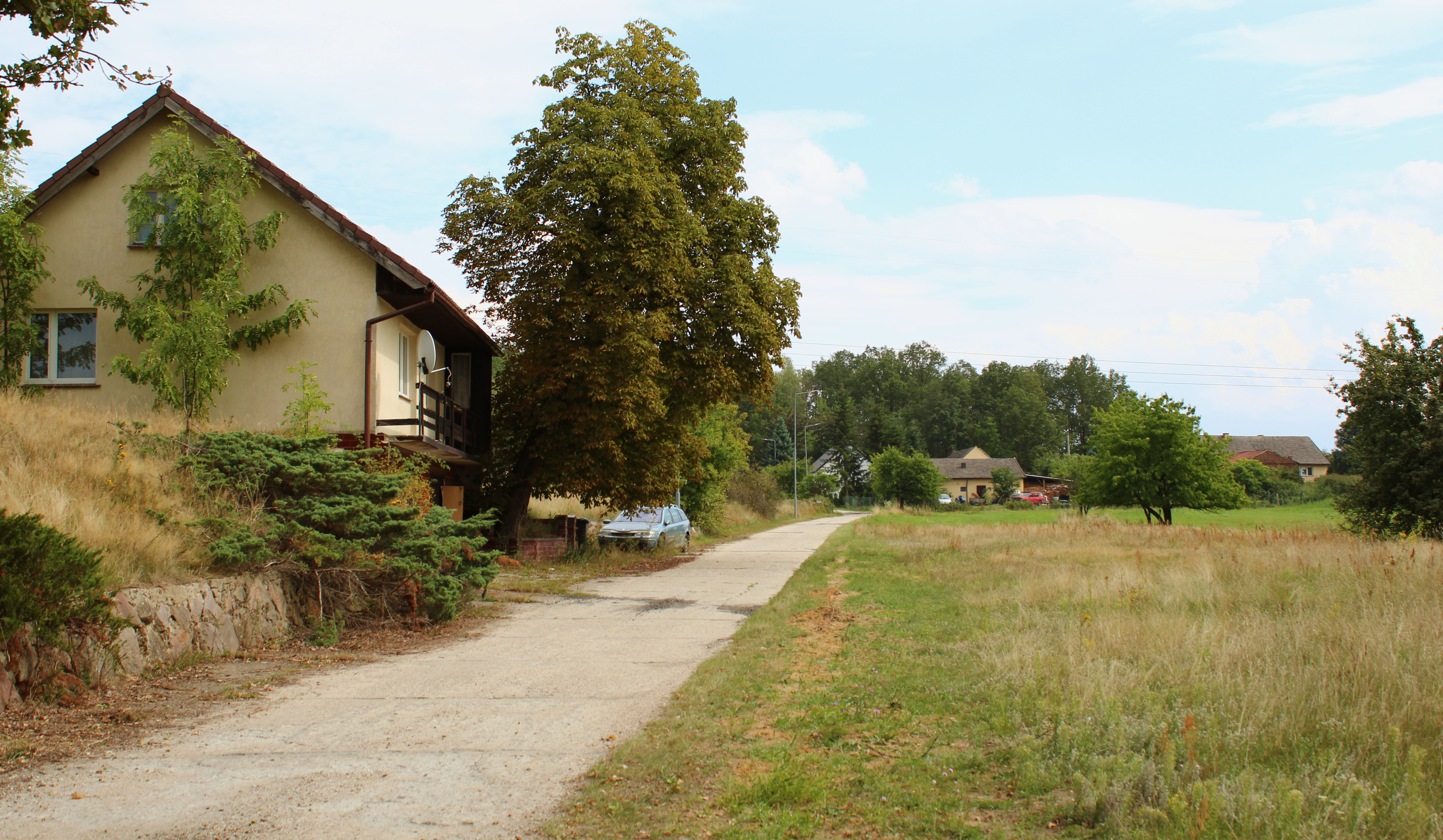

- Location within Poland
- Coordinates: 51°47′N 15°19′E
- Country: Poland
- Voivodeship: Lubusz
- County: Zielona Góra
- Gmina: Nowogród Bobrzański

Sobolice [sɔbɔˈlit͡sɛ] is a village in the administrative district of Gmina Nowogród Bobrzański, within Zielona Góra County, Lubusz Voivodeship, in western Poland.
