= Młynkowo, Lubusz Voivodeship =

Młynkowo
- Village
- Location within Poland
- Coordinates: 51°54′N 15°47′E
- Country: Poland
- Voivodeship: Lubusz
- County: Zielona Góra
- Gmina: Bojadła

Młynkowo [mwɨnˈkɔvɔ] is a village in the administrative district of Gmina Bojadła, within Zielona Góra County, Lubusz Voivodeship, in western Poland.
