= Przewóz, Zielona Góra County =

Przewóz
- Village
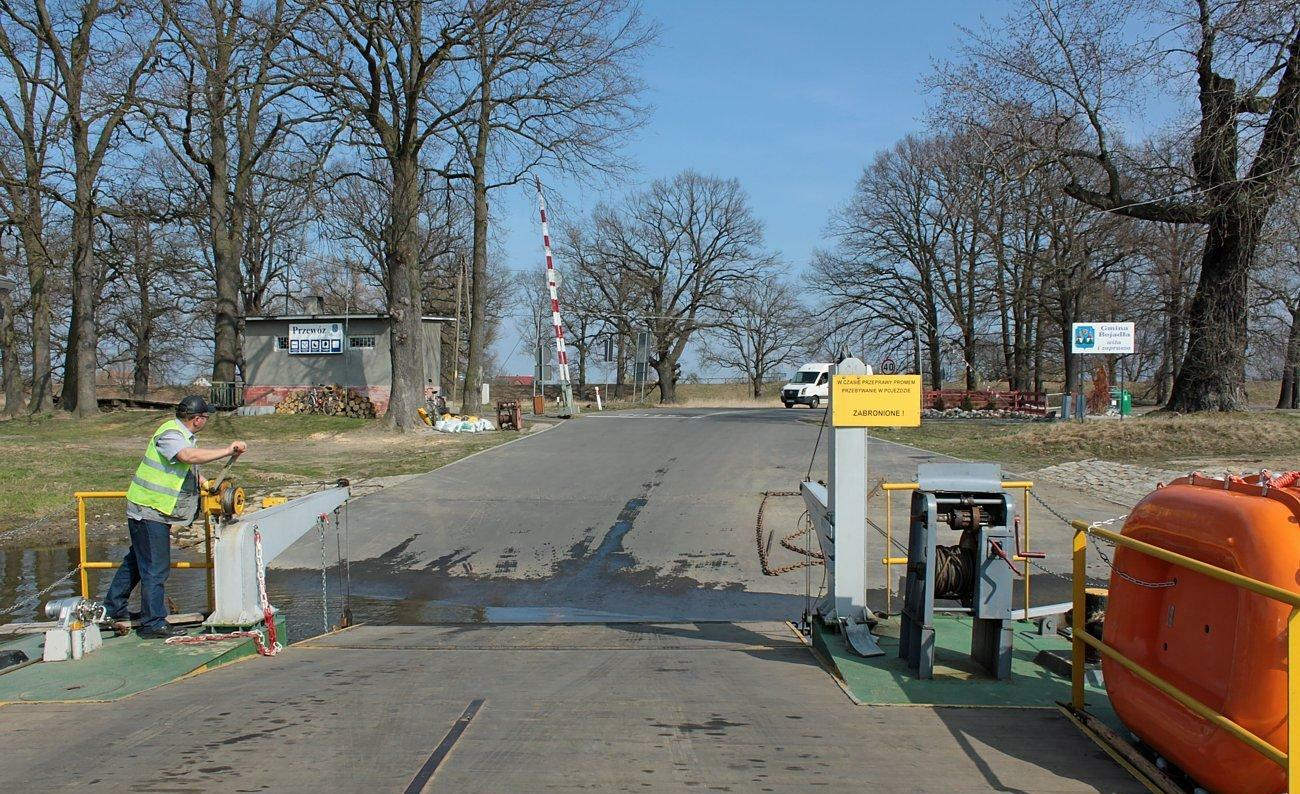

- Location within Poland
- Coordinates: 51°57′08″N 15°46′48″E
- Country: Poland
- Voivodeship: Lubusz
- County: Zielona Góra
- Gmina: Bojadła

Przewóz [ˈpʂɛvus] is a village in the administrative district of Gmina Bojadła, within Zielona Góra County, Lubusz Voivodeship, in western Poland.
