= Kartno, Lubusz Voivodeship =

Kartno
- Village
- Location within Poland
- Coordinates: 51°57′N 15°50′E
- Country: Poland
- Voivodeship: Lubusz
- County: Zielona Góra
- Gmina: Bojadła

Kartno [ˈkartnɔ] is a village in the administrative district of Gmina Bojadła, within Zielona Góra County, Lubusz Voivodeship, in western Poland.
