= Kaczenice =

- Village
- Location within Poland
- Coordinates: 51°50′N 15°21′E
- Country: Poland
- Voivodeship: Lubusz
- County: Zielona Góra
- Gmina: Nowogród Bobrzański
- Population: 200

Kaczenice [kat͡ʂɛˈnit͡sɛ] is a village in the administrative district of Gmina Nowogród Bobrzański, within Zielona Góra County, Lubusz Voivodeship, in western Poland.
