= Przybymierz =

- Village
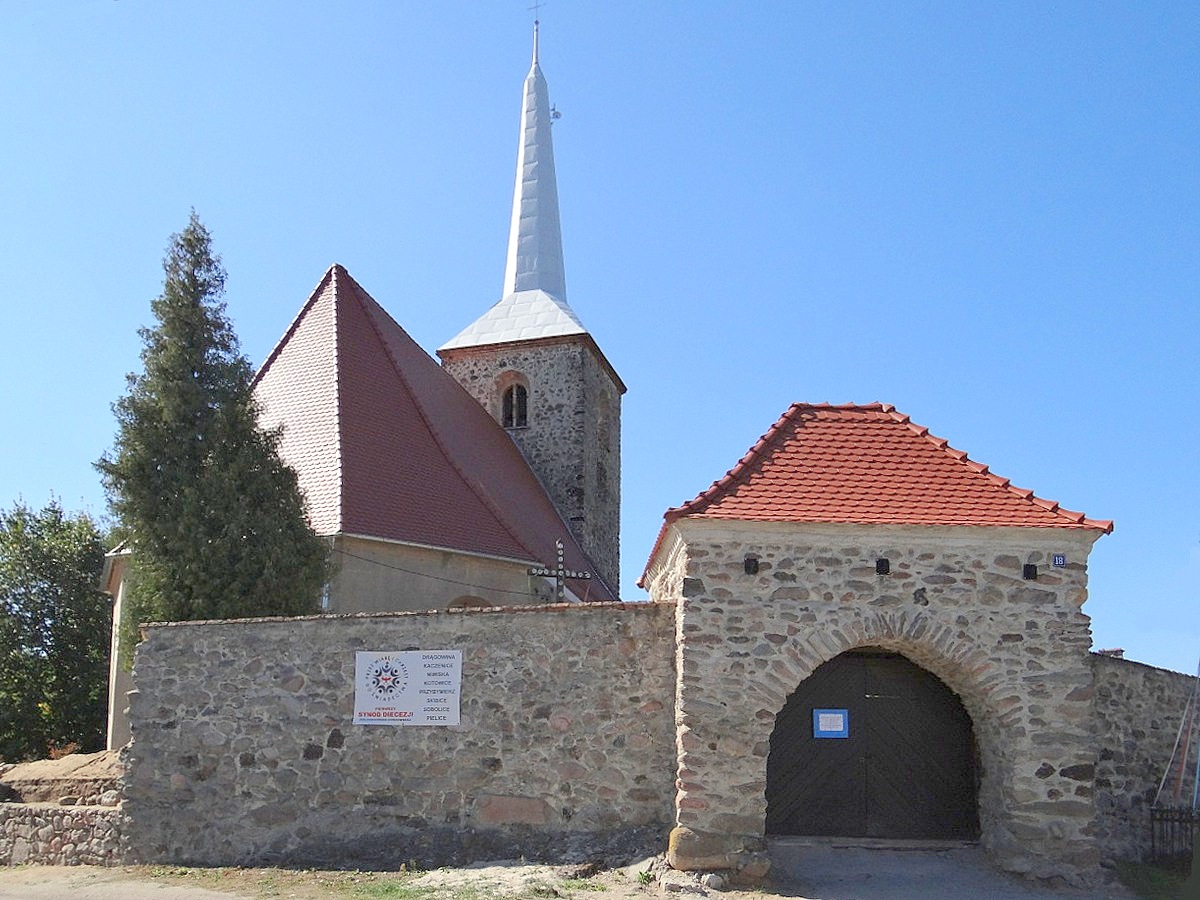
- Catholic church

- Location within Poland
- Coordinates: 51°45′N 15°21′E
- Country: Poland
- Voivodeship: Lubusz
- County: Zielona Góra
- Gmina: Nowogród Bobrzański

Przybymierz [pʂɨˈbɨmjɛʂ] is a village in the administrative district of Gmina Nowogród Bobrzański, within Zielona Góra County, Lubusz Voivodeship, in western Poland.
