= Laski, Gmina Czerwieńsk =

Laski
- Village
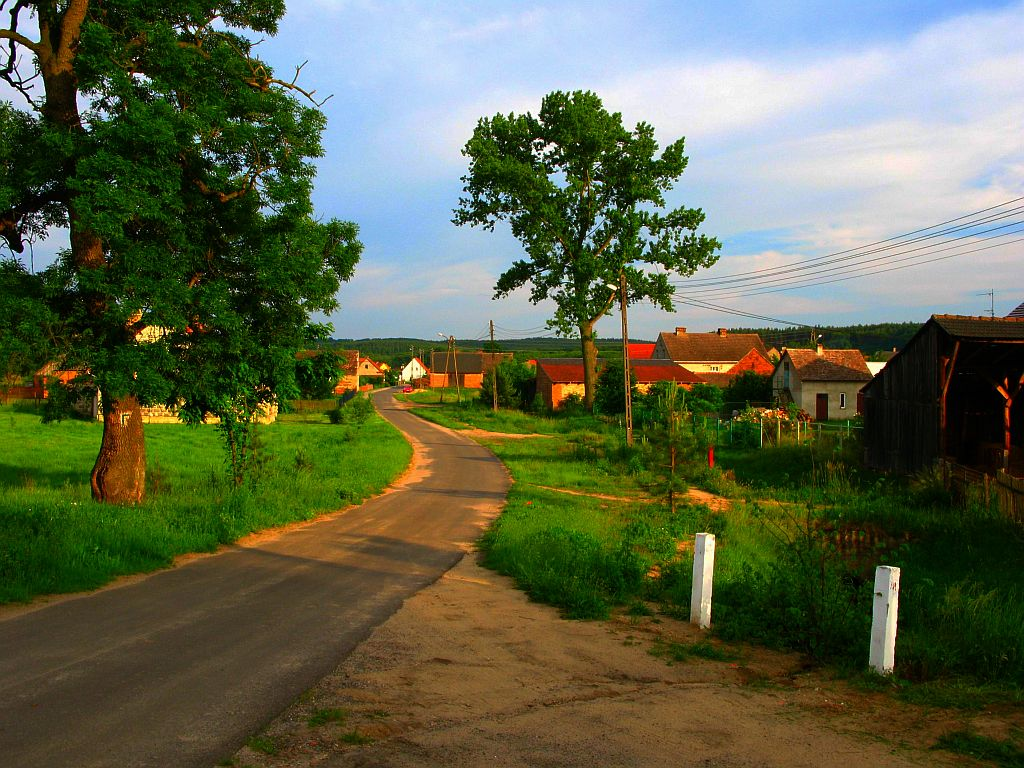
- Laski, Gmina Czerwieńsk, view towards the south

- Location within Poland
- Coordinates: 52°02′17″N 15°18′36″E
- Country: Poland
- Voivodeship: Lubusz
- County: Zielona Góra
- Gmina: Czerwieńsk

Laski (Polish pronunciation: [ˈlaskʲi]) is a village in the administrative district of Gmina Czerwieńsk, within Zielona Góra County, Lubusz Voivodeship, in western Poland.
