= Krzewiny, Lubusz Voivodeship =

Krzewiny
- Village
- Location within Poland
- Coordinates: 51°50′27″N 15°17′22″E
- Country: Poland
- Voivodeship: Lubusz
- County: Zielona Góra
- Gmina: Nowogród Bobrzański

Krzewiny [kʂɛˈvinɨ] is a village in the administrative district of Gmina Nowogród Bobrzański, within Zielona Góra County, Lubusz Voivodeship, in western Poland.
