= Pólko, Lubusz Voivodeship =

Pólko
- Village
- Location within Poland
- Coordinates: 51°57′55″N 15°51′38″E
- Country: Poland
- Voivodeship: Lubusz
- County: Zielona Góra
- Gmina: Bojadła

Pólko [ˈpulkɔ] is a village in the administrative district of Gmina Bojadła, within Zielona Góra County, Lubusz Voivodeship, in western Poland.
