= Bełcze =

- Village
- Location within Poland
- Coordinates: 51°59′N 15°50′E
- Country: Poland
- Voivodeship: Lubusz
- County: Zielona Góra
- Gmina: Bojadła

Bełcze [ˈbɛu̯t͡ʂɛ] is a village in the administrative district of Gmina Bojadła, within Zielona Góra County, Lubusz Voivodeship, in western Poland.
