= Kliniczki =

- Settlement
- Location within Poland
- Coordinates: 51°58′22″N 15°46′13″E
- Country: Poland
- Voivodeship: Lubusz
- County: Zielona Góra
- Gmina: Bojadła

Kliniczki [kliˈnit͡ʂki] is a settlement in the administrative district of Gmina Bojadła, within Zielona Góra County, Lubusz Voivodeship, in western Poland.
