= Wirówek, Gmina Bojadła =

Wirówek
- Settlement
- Location within Poland
- Coordinates: 51°58′34″N 15°48′16″E
- Country: Poland
- Voivodeship: Lubusz
- County: Zielona Góra
- Gmina: Bojadła

Wirówek [viˈruvɛk] is a settlement in the administrative district of Gmina Bojadła, within Zielona Góra County, Lubusz Voivodeship, in western Poland.
