= Gmina Bojadła =

Gmina Bojadła Bojadła Commune
- Gmina
- Coat of arms

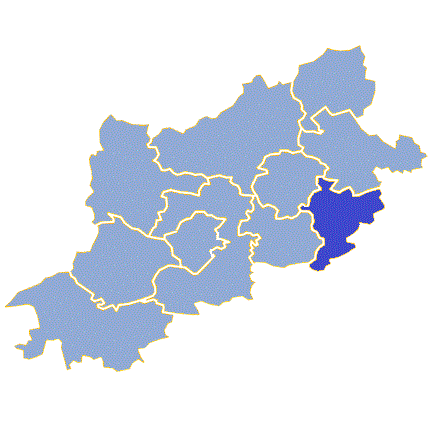
- Gmina Bojadła in Zielona Góra County

- Location within Poland
- Coordinates (Bojadła): 51°57′N 15°49′E
- Country: Poland
- Voivodeship: Lubusz
- County: Zielona Góra
- Seat: Bojadła

Area
  - Total: 102.55 km^{2} (39.59 sq mi)

Population (2019-06-30)
  - Total: 3,267
  - Density: 31.86/km^{2} (82.51/sq mi)
- Website: www.bojadla.pl

Gmina Bojadła is a rural gmina (administrative district) in Zielona Góra County, Lubusz Voivodeship, in western Poland. Its seat is the village of Bojadła, which lies approximately 22 kilometres (14 mi) east of Zielona Góra.

The gmina covers an area of 102.55 square kilometres (39.6 sq mi), and as of 2019 its total population is 3,267.

== Villages ==
Gmina Bojadła contains the villages and settlements of Bełcze, Bojadła, Karczemka, Kartno, Klenica, Kliniczki, Młynkowo, Pólko, Przewóz, Pyrnik, Siadcza, Sosnówka, Susłów and Wirówek.

== Neighbouring gminas ==
Gmina Bojadła is bordered by the gminas of Kargowa, Kolsko, Nowa Sól, Otyń, Trzebiechów and Zabór.
