= Gmina Czerwieńsk =

Gmina Czerwieńsk Czerwieńsk Commune
- Gmina
- Coat of arms

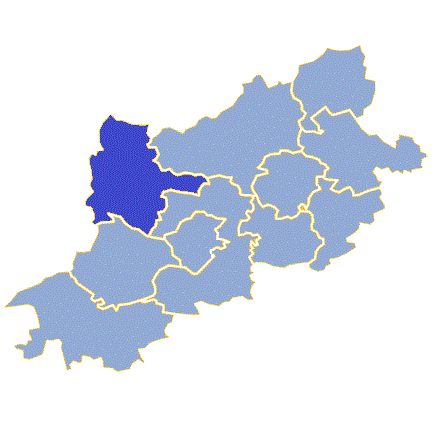
- Gmina Czerwieńsk in Zielona Góra County
- Coordinates (Czerwieńsk): 52°0′56″N 15°24′18″E
- Country: Poland
- Voivodeship: Lubusz
- County: Zielona Góra
- Seat: Czerwieńsk

Area
  - Total: 195.93 km^{2} (75.65 sq mi)

Population (2019-06-30)
  - Total: 10,004
  - Density: 51.059/km^{2} (132.24/sq mi)
  - Urban: 4,041
  - Rural: 5,963
- Website: czerwiensk.pl

Gmina Czerwieńsk is an urban-rural gmina (administrative district) in Zielona Góra County, Lubusz Voivodeship, in western Poland. Its seat is the town of Czerwieńsk, which lies approximately 11 kilometres (7 mi) north-west of Zielona Góra.

The gmina covers an area of 195.93 square kilometres (75.6 sq mi), and as of 2019 its total population is 10,004.

The gmina contains part of the protected area called Gryżyna Landscape Park.

== Villages ==
Apart from the town of Czerwieńsk, Gmina Czerwieńsk contains the villages and settlements of Będów, Bródki, Dobrzęcin, Laski, Leśniów Mały, Leśniów Wielki, Nietków, Nietkowice, Płoty, Sudoł, Sycowice, Wysokie and Zagórze.

== Neighbouring gminas ==
Gmina Czerwieńsk is bordered by the gminas of Bytnica, Dąbie, Krosno Odrzańskie, Skąpe, Sulechów, Świdnica and Zielona Góra.

== Twin towns – sister cities ==
Gmina Czerwieńsk is twinned with:

- Drebkau, Germany
- Suzdal, Russia
