= Krzywaniec =

- Settlement
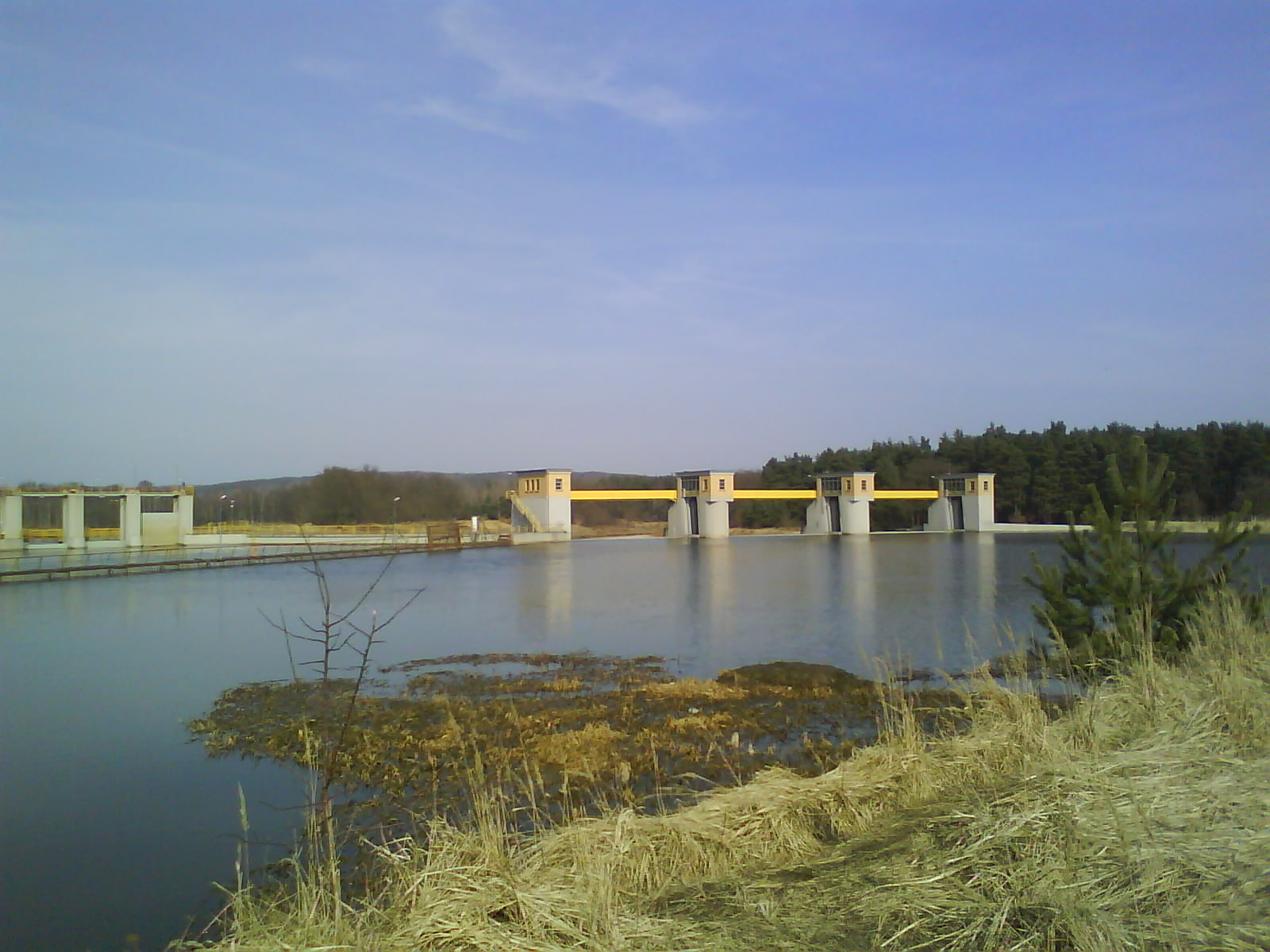

- Location within Poland
- Coordinates: 51°50′20″N 15°10′45″E
- Country: Poland
- Voivodeship: Lubusz
- County: Zielona Góra
- Gmina: Nowogród Bobrzański

Krzywaniec [kʂɨˈvaɲɛt͡s] is a settlement in the administrative district of Gmina Nowogród Bobrzański, within Zielona Góra County, Lubusz Voivodeship, in western Poland.
