= Cieszów, Lubusz Voivodeship =

Cieszów
- Village
- Location within Poland
- Coordinates: 51°49′9″N 15°13′18″E
- Country: Poland
- Voivodeship: Lubusz
- County: Zielona Góra
- Gmina: Nowogród Bobrzański

Cieszów [ˈt͡ɕɛʂuf] is a village in the administrative district of Gmina Nowogród Bobrzański, within the Zielona Góra County, Lubusz Voivodeship, in western Poland.
