= Gmina Nowogród Bobrzański =

Gmina Nowogród Bobrzański Nowogród Bobrzański Commune
- Gmina
- Coat of arms

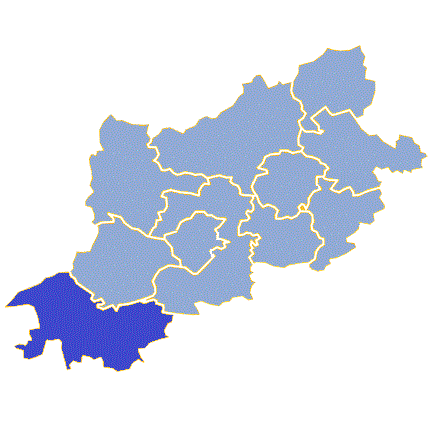
- Gmina Nowogród Bobrzański in Zielona Góra County
- Coordinates (Nowogród Bobrzański): 51°48′N 15°14′E
- Country: Poland
- Voivodeship: Lubusz
- County: Zielona Góra
- Seat: Nowogród Bobrzański

Area
  - Total: 259.41 km^{2} (100.16 sq mi)

Population (2019-06-30)
  - Total: 9,487
  - Density: 36.57/km^{2} (94.72/sq mi)
  - Urban: 5,165
  - Rural: 4,322
- Website: nowogrodbobrz.pl

Gmina Nowogród Bobrzański is an urban-rural gmina (administrative district) in Zielona Góra County, Lubusz Voivodeship, in western Poland. Its seat is the town of Nowogród Bobrzański, which lies approximately 25 kilometres (16 mi) south-west of Zielona Góra.

The gmina covers an area of 259.41 square kilometres (100.16 sq mi), and as of 2019 its total population is 9,487.

== Villages ==
Apart from the town of Nowogród Bobrzański, Gmina Nowogród Bobrzański contains the villages and settlements of Białowice, Bogaczów, Cieszów, Dobroszów Mały, Dobroszów Wielki, Drągowina, Kaczenice, Kamionka, Klępina, Kotowice, Krzewiny, Krzywa, Krzywaniec, Łagoda, Niwiska, Pajęczno, Pielice, Pierzwin, Podgórzyce, Popowice, Przybymierz, Skibice, Sobolice, Sterków, Turów, Urzuty and Wysoka.

== Neighbouring gminas ==
Gmina Nowogród Bobrzański is bordered by the gminas of Bobrowice, Brzeźnica, Dąbie, Jasień, Kożuchów, Lubsko, Świdnica, Żagań, Żary and Zielona Góra.

== Twin towns – sister cities ==
Gmina Nowogród Bobrzański is twinned with:

- Cimișlia, Moldova
- Lübbenau, Germany
- Westerwolde, Netherlands
