= Stary Kisielin =

- District of Zielona Góra
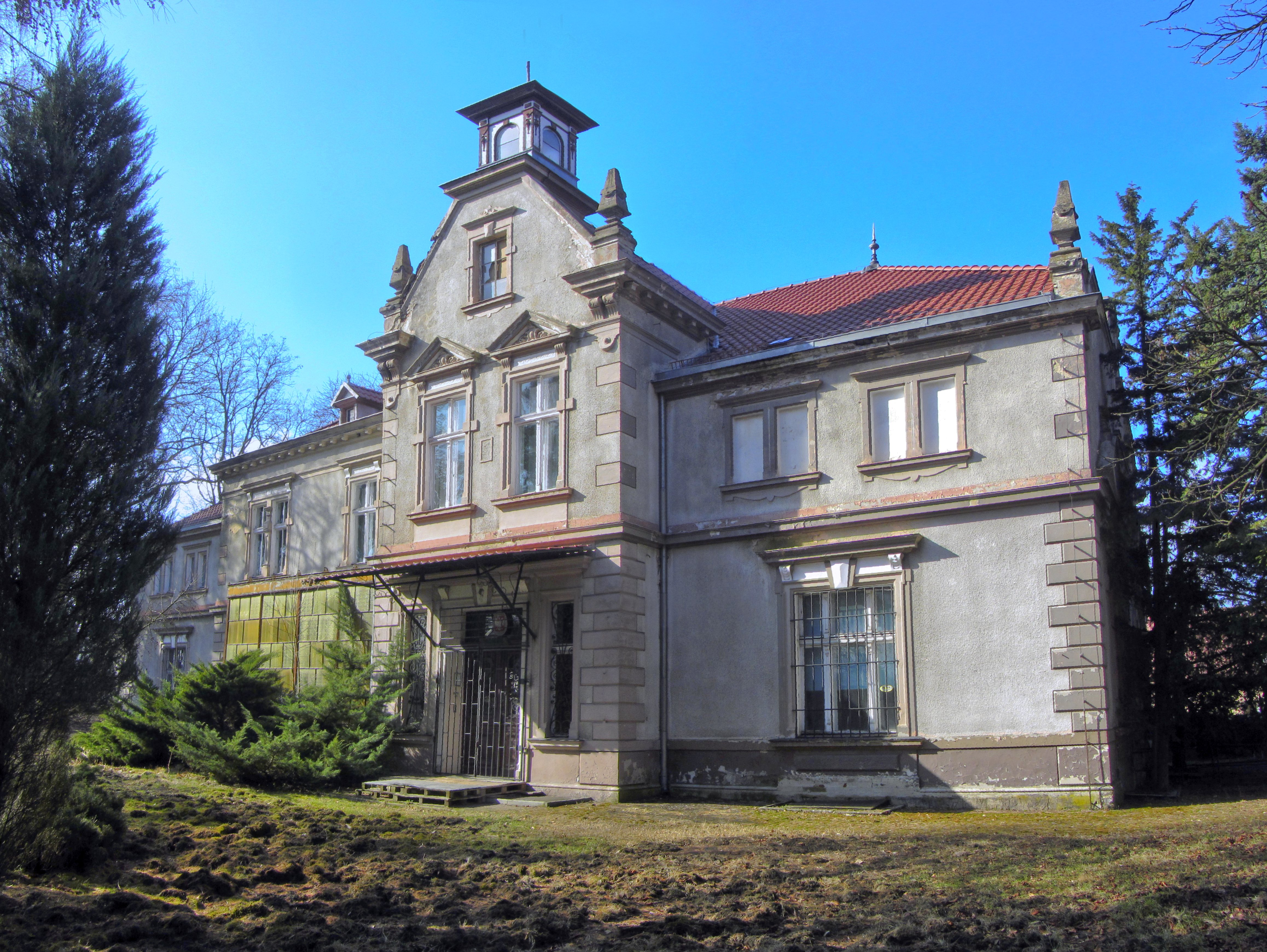
- The palace in Stary Kisielin

- Location within Poland Location within Lubusz Voivodeship
- Coordinates: 51°56′N 15°35′E
- Country: Poland
- Voivodeship: Lubusz
- County/City: Zielona Góra

Population
  - Total: 1,561
- Time zone: UTC+1 (CET)
  - Summer (DST): UTC+2 (CEST)
- Postal code: 66-002
- Area code: +48 68
- Vehicle registration: FZ

Stary Kisielin [ˈstarɨ kiˈɕɛlin] is a district of the city of Zielona Góra, in western Poland, located in the eastern part of the city. It was a separate village until 2014.

Stary Kisielin has a population of 1,561.
