= Jeleniów, Lubusz Voivodeship =

Jeleniów
- District of Zielona Góra
- Location within Poland Location within Lubusz Voivodeship
- Coordinates: 51°51′N 15°27′E
- Country: Poland
- Voivodeship: Lubusz
- County/City: Zielona Góra
- Population: 157
- Time zone: UTC+1 (CET)
  - Summer (DST): UTC+2 (CEST)

Jeleniów [jɛˈlɛɲuf] (German: Droseheydau) is a district of the city of Zielona Góra, in western Poland, located in the southern part of the city. It was a separate village until 2014.

Jeleniów has a population of 157.
