= Barcikowice =

- District of Zielona Góra
- Location within Poland Location within Lubusz Voivodeship
- Coordinates: 51°51′N 15°33′E
- Country: Poland
- Voivodeship: Lubusz
- County/City: Zielona Góra

Population
  - Total: 160
- Time zone: UTC+1 (CET)
  - Summer (DST): UTC+2 (CEST)
- Postal code: 66-004

Barcikowice [bart͡ɕikɔˈvit͡sɛ] is a district of the city of Zielona Góra, in western Poland, located in the southern part of the city. It was a separate village until 2014.

Barcikowice has a population of 160.
