= Jany, Lubusz Voivodeship =

Jany
- District of Zielona Góra
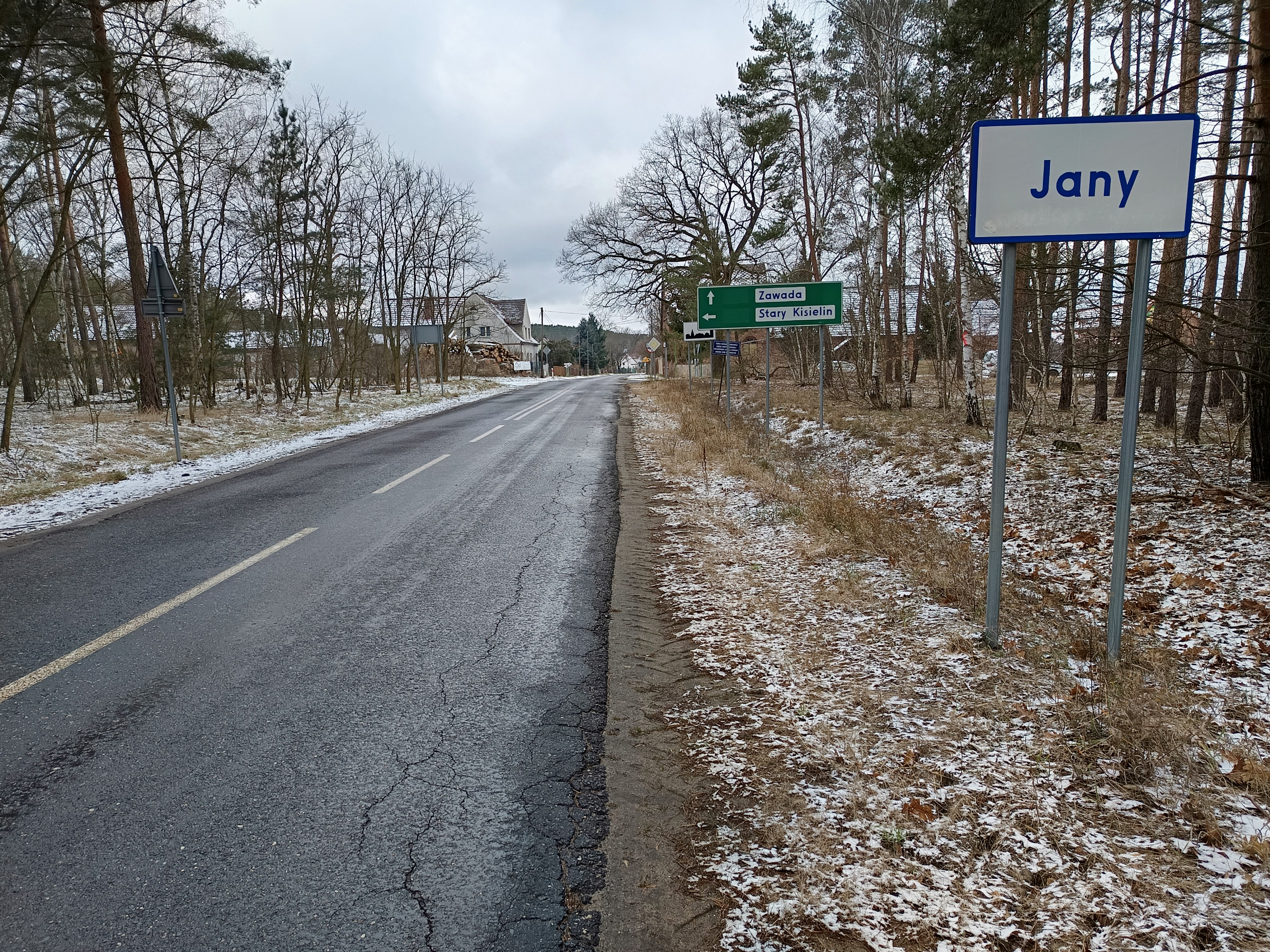

- Location within Poland Location within Lubusz Voivodeship
- Coordinates: 51°58′N 15°36′E
- Country: Poland
- Voivodeship: Lubusz
- County/City: Zielona Góra

Population
  - Total: 333
- Time zone: UTC+1 (CET)
  - Summer (DST): UTC+2 (CEST)
- Postal code: 66-001

Jany [ˈjanɨ] is a district of the city of Zielona Góra, in western Poland, located in the northeastern part of the city. It was a separate village until 2014.

Jany has a population of 333.
