= Jarogniewice, Lubusz Voivodeship =

Jarogniewice
- District of Zielona Góra
- Location within Poland Location within Lubusz Voivodeship
- Coordinates: 51°50′N 15°29′E
- Country: Poland
- Voivodeship: Lubusz
- County/City: Zielona Góra
- Population: 312
- Time zone: UTC+1 (CET)
  - Summer (DST): UTC+2 (CEST)

Jarogniewice [jarɔɡɲɛˈvit͡sɛ] (German: Hartmannsdorf) is a district of the city of Zielona Góra, in western Poland, located in the southern part of the city. It was a separate village until 2014.

Jarogniewice has a population of 312.

There is a historic church of St. Anthony in Jarogniewice.
