= Racula =

- District of Zielona Góra
- Location within Poland Location within Lubusz Voivodeship
- Coordinates: 51°54′N 15°33′E
- Country: Poland
- Voivodeship: Lubusz
- County/City: Zielona Góra

Population
  - Total: 1,924
- Time zone: UTC+1 (CET)
  - Summer (DST): UTC+2 (CEST)
- Postal code: 66-004
- Area code: +48 68
- Vehicle registration: FZ
- Website: http://www.racula.pl

Racula [raˈt͡sula] is a district of the city of Zielona Góra, in western Poland, located in the southeastern part of the city. It was a separate village until 2014.

Racula has a population of 1,924.

There is a historic Gothic church of St. Nicholas in Racula.
