= Nowogród Bobrzański =

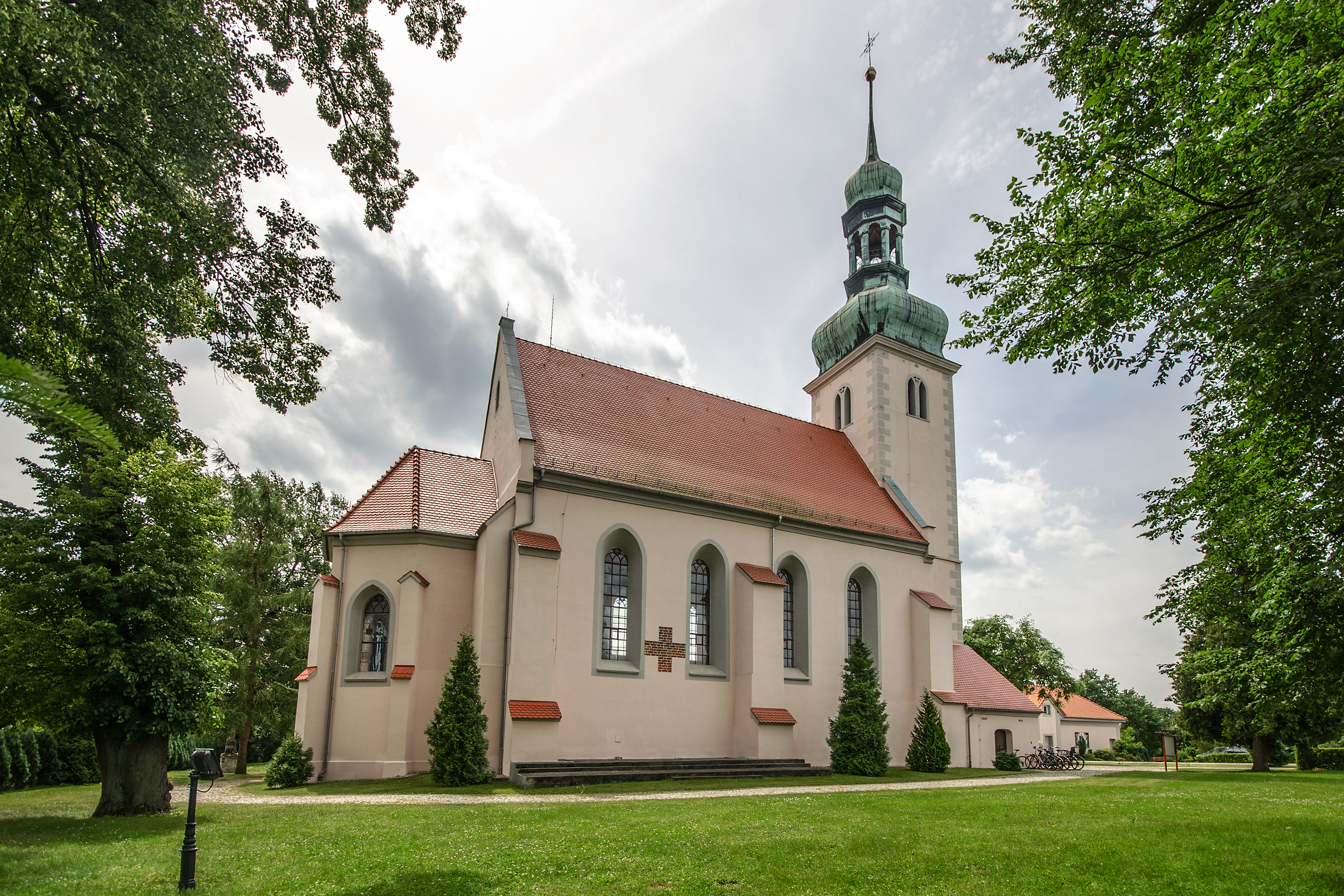
- Church of the Assumption of Mary

- Coat of arms

- Location within Poland
- Coordinates: 51°48′N 15°14′E
- Country: Poland
- Voivodeship: Lubusz
- County: Zielona Góra
- Gmina: Nowogród Bobrzański
- Town rights: 13th century–1945, 1988–

Government
  - Mayor: Grzegorz Ludwik Jankowski

Area
  - Total: 14.63 km^{2} (5.65 sq mi)

Population (2019-06-30)
  - Total: 5,165
  - Density: 353.0/km^{2} (914.4/sq mi)
- Time zone: UTC+1 (CET)
  - Summer (DST): UTC+2 (CEST)
- Postal code: 66-010 to 66-011
- Car plates: FZI
- Climate: Cfb
- Website: nowogrodbobrz.pl

Nowogród Bobrzański pronounced ['nɔˈvɔɡrut bɔˈbʐaɲskʲi] (German: Naumburg am Bober) is a town on the Bóbr river in Zielona Góra County, Lubusz Voivodeship, in western Poland, with 5,165 inhabitants (2019). It is the administrative seat of the Gmina Nowogród Bobrzański.

== History ==
The historic town was established in 1202 on the eastern banks of the Bóbr as the seat of a castellan in medieval Piast-ruled Poland. The Piast duke Henry I the Bearded established a college of Augustinian canons here in 1217. From 1274 Nowogród Bobrzański was part of the Silesian Duchy of Żagań. It received town rights in 1314. It was consumed by fire and destroyed by plagues in 1350, 1479 and 1723. A route connecting Warsaw and Poznań with Dresden ran through Krzystkowice in the 18th century and King Augustus III of Poland often traveled that route. In 1827 mineral springs were discovered and many tourists began to arrive.

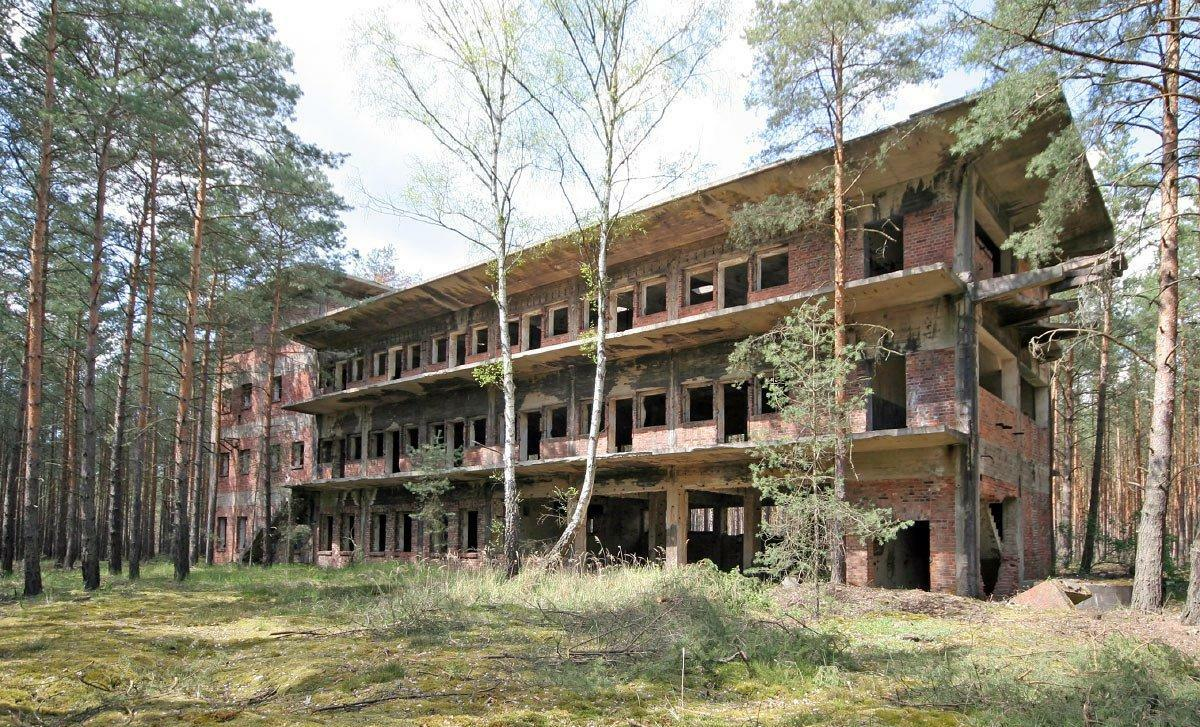
Former ammunition factory from WWII

During World War II, the Germans established and operated eleven forced labour camps, whose prisoners mainly built a chemical plant of the Dynamit Nobel AG company in the present-day district of Krzystkowice, and then worked in it. One of the camps was converted into a subcamp of the Gross-Rosen concentration camp, whose prisoners were Jewish women from various German-occupied countries. The town was the seat of the firm Ostdeutsche Tiefbau GmbH ("East German Civil Engineering, Inc."), which was one of the contractors responsible for razing the Warsaw Ghetto. During the final stages of the war, in February 1945, remaining prisoners were sent on a German-perpetrated death march towards Cheb in German-occupied Czechoslovakia. Additionally, a death march of prisoners of a subcamp of Gross-Rosen from Nowa Sól to Svatava passed through the town.

After passing again to Poland, the town's residents were expelled in accordance with the Potsdam Agreement. Renamed Nowogród, the town lost its town rights due to depopulation, and again acquired them in 1988 by the merger with the adjacent Lower Lusatian town of Krzystkowice.

== Geography ==
The highest hill has 166.4 meters altitude. There are two rivers: the Bóbr and the Brzeźniczanka. Woods take up 60% of the land. The forest covers an area of 30.568 hectares (75.54 acres) and is divided into 22 parks. Overall, the forest constitutes 16.5% of Zielona Góra district. The pine is the most common tree. The age of an average tree is about 48 years. The annual growth of trees is 2.65 cubic metres per one hectare. The abundance of trees is high, as it is about 125 cubic metres for one hectare. There are two nurseries: Tuchola and Guzów.

The Forest Inspectorate of Nowogród Bobrzański manages the following protection areas:

- The nature reserve “Dąbrowa Brzeźnicza”
- Peat bogs with rare species of animals such as beavers, cranes, snipes, harriers and rare species of plants, including ivy and laurel.
- Nature monument made up by 8 old-growth trees, and the erratic boulder called “Diabelski Kamień”.

== Points of interest ==
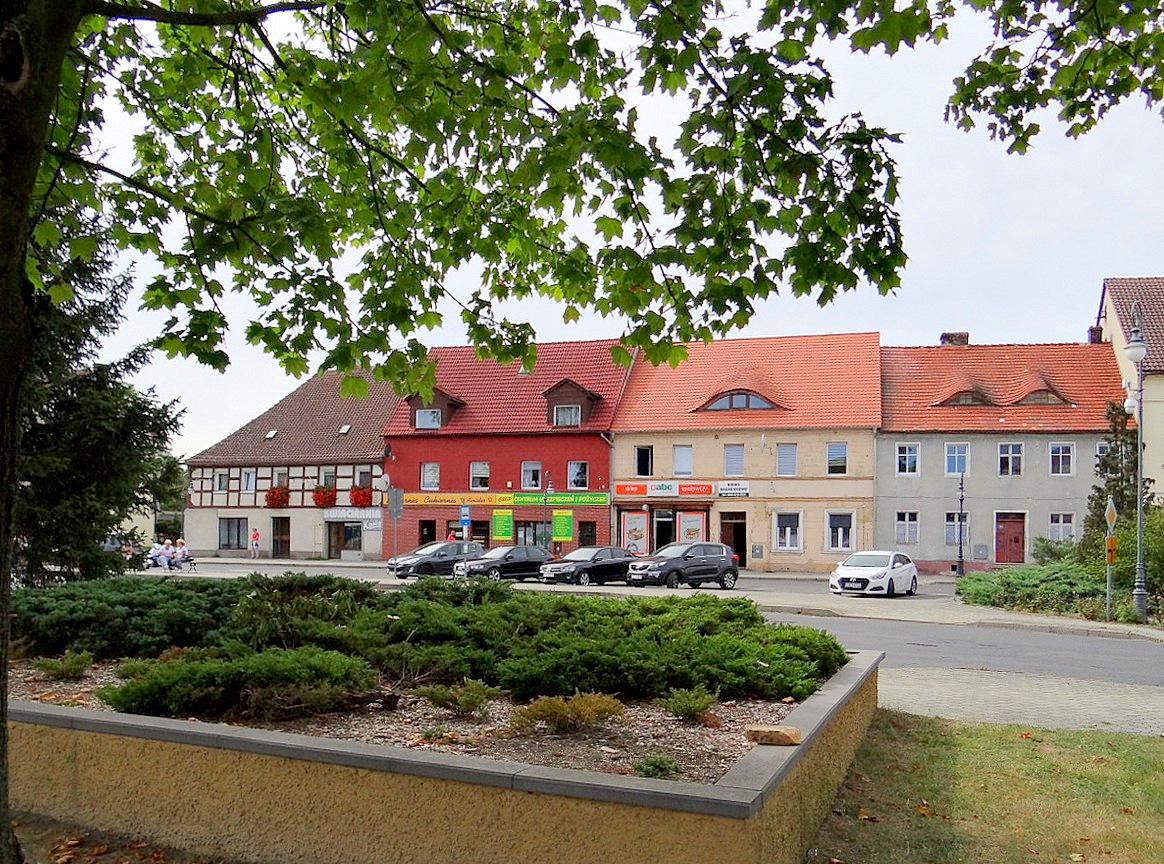
Market Square

- St. Bartholomew Church from 12th century
- Assumption Church from 13th century
- Ruins of the factory where munitions were produced by Nazi Germany in 1940–1945

== Twin towns – sister cities ==
See twin towns of Gmina Nowogród Bobrzański.
