= Bojadła =

- Village
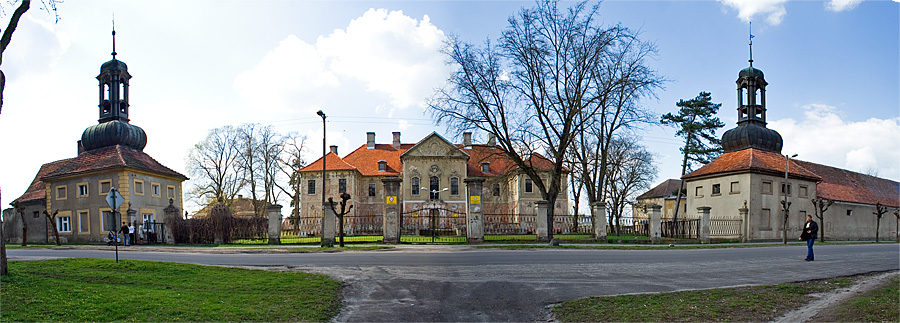

- Location within Poland
- Coordinates: 51°57′N 15°49′E
- Country: Poland
- Voivodeship: Lubusz
- County: Lubuskie
- Gmina: Bojadła
- Population: 1,200

Bojadła [bɔˈjadwa] is a village in County Lubuskie, Lubusz Voivodeship, in western Poland. It is the seat of the gmina (administrative district) called Gmina Bojadła.
