= Sucha, Lubusz Voivodeship =

Sucha
- District of Zielona Góra
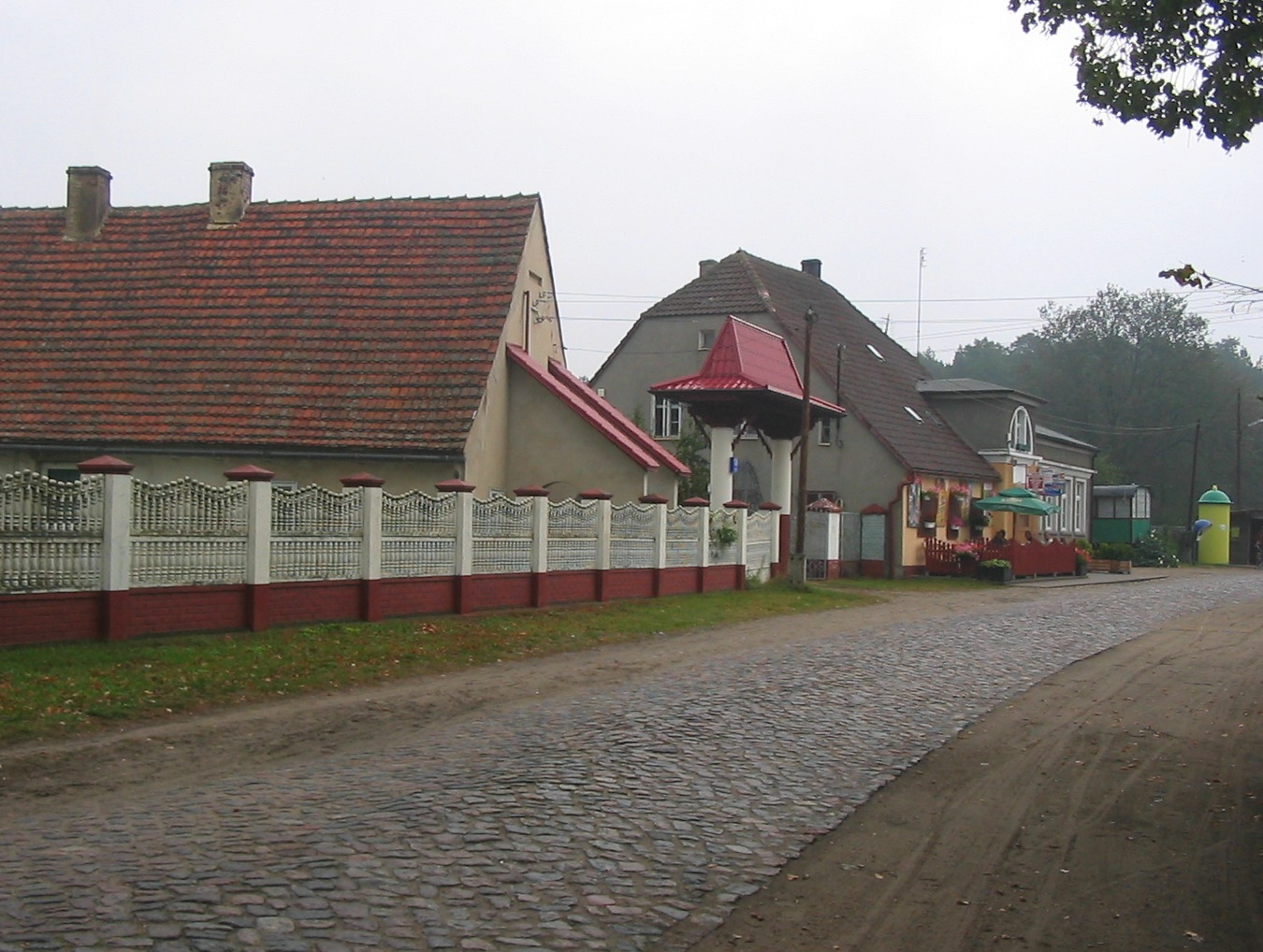
- Houses in Sucha

- Location within Poland Location within Lubusz Voivodeship
- Coordinates: 51°52′N 15°35′E
- Country: Poland
- Voivodeship: Lubusz
- County/City: Zielona Góra

Population
  - Total: 300
- Time zone: UTC+1 (CET)
  - Summer (DST): UTC+2 (CEST)
- Postal code: 66-004
- Area code: +48 68
- Vehicle registration: FZ

Sucha [ˈsuxa] is a district of the city of Zielona Góra, in western Poland, located in the southeastern part of the city. It was a separate village until 2014.

Sucha has a population of 300.

There is a historic Neoclassical Saint Martin church in Sucha.
