= Kiełpin, Zielona Góra County =

Kiełpin
- District of Zielona Góra
- Location within Poland Location within Lubusz Voivodeship
- Coordinates: 51°52′N 15°30′E
- Country: Poland
- Voivodeship: Lubusz
- County/City: Zielona Góra
- Population: 161
- Time zone: UTC+1 (CET)
  - Summer (DST): UTC+2 (CEST)
- Postal code: 66-006

Kiełpin [ˈkʲɛu̯pin] is a district of the city of Zielona Góra, in western Poland, located in the southern part of the city. It was a separate village until 2014.

Kiełpin has a population of 161.
