= Zawada, Zielona Góra County =

Zawada
- District of Zielona Góra
- Location within Poland Location within Lubusz Voivodeship
- Coordinates: 51°59′14″N 15°34′12″E
- Country: Poland
- Voivodeship: Lubusz
- County/City: Zielona Góra
- Population: 1,629
- Time zone: UTC+1 (CET)
  - Summer (DST): UTC+2 (CEST)
- Area code: +48 68
- Vehicle registration: FZ

Zawada [zaˈvada] (German: Sawade, after 1936: Eichwaldau) is a district of the city of Zielona Góra, in western Poland, located in the northeastern part of the city. It was a separate village until 2014.

Zawada has a population of 1,629.
