= Krępa Mała =

- District of Zielona Góra
- Location within Poland Location within Lubusz Voivodeship
- Coordinates: 52°1′29″N 15°31′29″E
- Country: Poland
- Voivodeship: Lubusz
- County/City: Zielona Góra
- Time zone: UTC+1 (CET)
  - Summer (DST): UTC+2 (CEST)
- Postal code: 66-001
- Area code: +48 68
- Vehicle registration: FZ

Krępa Mała [ˈkrɛmpa ˈmawa]) is a district of the city of Zielona Góra, in western Poland, located in the northern part of the city. It was a separate village until 2014.
