= Stożne, Lubusz Voivodeship =

Stożne
- District of Zielona Góra
- Location within Poland Location within Lubusz Voivodeship
- Coordinates: 51°59′53″N 15°36′39″E
- Country: Poland
- Voivodeship: Lubusz
- County/City: Zielona Góra
- Population: 75
- Time zone: UTC+1 (CET)
  - Summer (DST): UTC+2 (CEST)
- Postal code: 66-001
- Area code: +48 68
- Vehicle registration: FZ

Stożne [ˈstɔʐnɛ]) is a district of the city of Zielona Góra, in western Poland, located in the northeastern part of the city. It was a separate village until 2014.

Stożne has a population of 75.
