= Zielona Góra County =

Zielona Góra County Powiat zielonogórski
- County
- Flag Coat of arms

- Location within the voivodeship
- Coordinates (Zielona Góra): 51°56′23″N 15°30′18″E
- Country: Poland
- Voivodeship: Lubusz
- Seat: Zielona Góra
- Gminas: Total 9: Gmina Babimost; Gmina Bojadła; Gmina Czerwieńsk; Gmina Kargowa; Gmina Nowogród Bobrzański; Gmina Sulechów; Gmina Świdnica; Gmina Trzebiechów; Gmina Zabór

Area
  - Total: 1,349.75 km^{2} (521.14 sq mi)

Population (2019-06-30)
  - Total: 75,626
  - Density: 56.030/km^{2} (145.12/sq mi)
  - Urban: 33,732
  - Rural: 41,894
- Car plates: FZI
- Website: www.powiat-zielonogorski.pl

Zielona Góra County (Polish: powiat zielonogórski) is a unit of territorial administration and local government (powiat) in Lubusz Voivodeship, western Poland. It came into being on 1 January 1999, as a result of the Polish local government reforms passed in 1998. Its administrative seat is the city of Zielona Góra, although the city is not part of the county (it constitutes a separate city county). The county contains five towns: Sulechów, which lies 23 km (14 mi) north-east of Zielona Góra, Nowogród Bobrzański, which lies 25 km (16 mi) south-west of Zielona Góra, Babimost, which lies 40 km (25 mi) north-east of Zielona Góra, Czerwieńsk, which lies 11 km (7 mi) north-west of Zielona Góra, and Kargowa, 40 km (25 mi) north-east of Zielona Góra.

The county covers an area of 1,349.75 square kilometres (521.1 sq mi). As of 2019 its total population is 75,626. The most populated towns are Sulechów with 16,831 inhabitants and Nowogród Bobrzański with 5,165 inhabitants.

== Neighbouring counties ==
Apart from the city of Zielona Góra, Zielona Góra County is also bordered by Świebodzin County to the north, Nowy Tomyśl County to the north-east, Wolsztyn County to the east, Nowa Sól County to the south-east, Żagań County to the south, Żary County to the south-west and Krosno County to the west.

== Administrative divisions ==
The county is subdivided into 9 gminas (five urban-rural and four rural). These are listed in the following table, in descending order of population.

Gmina	Type	Area (km^{2})	Population (2019)	Seat
Gmina Sulechów	urban-rural	236.7	26,397	Sulechów
Gmina Czerwieńsk	urban-rural	195.9	10,004	Czerwieńsk
Gmina Nowogród Bobrzański	urban-rural	259.4	9,487	Nowogród Bobrzański
Gmina Świdnica	rural	160.8	6,552	Świdnica
Gmina Babimost	urban-rural	92.8	6,212	Babimost
Gmina Kargowa	urban-rural	128.5	5,853	Kargowa
Gmina Zabór	rural	93.3	4,282	Zabór
Gmina Trzebiechów	rural	81.0	3,409	Trzebiechów
Gmina Bojadła	rural	102.6	3,267	Bojadła

== Climate ==
Climate data for Zielona Gora
Month	Jan	Feb	Mar	Apr	May	Jun	Jul	Aug	Sep	Oct	Nov	Dec	Year
Mean daily maximum °C (°F)	1 (34)	2 (35)	7 (45)	11 (52)	17 (63)	20 (68)	22 (71)	22 (71)	17 (63)	12 (54)	6 (42)	3 (37)	12 (53)
Mean daily minimum °C (°F)	−3 (27)	−3 (27)	1 (33)	4 (39)	9 (48)	12 (54)	14 (57)	14 (57)	11 (51)	6 (43)	2 (35)	−1 (30)	6 (42)
Average precipitation mm (inches)	38 (1.5)	36 (1.4)	36 (1.4)	43 (1.7)	58 (2.3)	64 (2.5)	79 (3.1)	74 (2.9)	43 (1.7)	41 (1.6)	43 (1.7)	46 (1.8)	600 (23.6)
Source: Weatherbase
