= Lower Silesian dialect group =

Dialects of the Silesian language

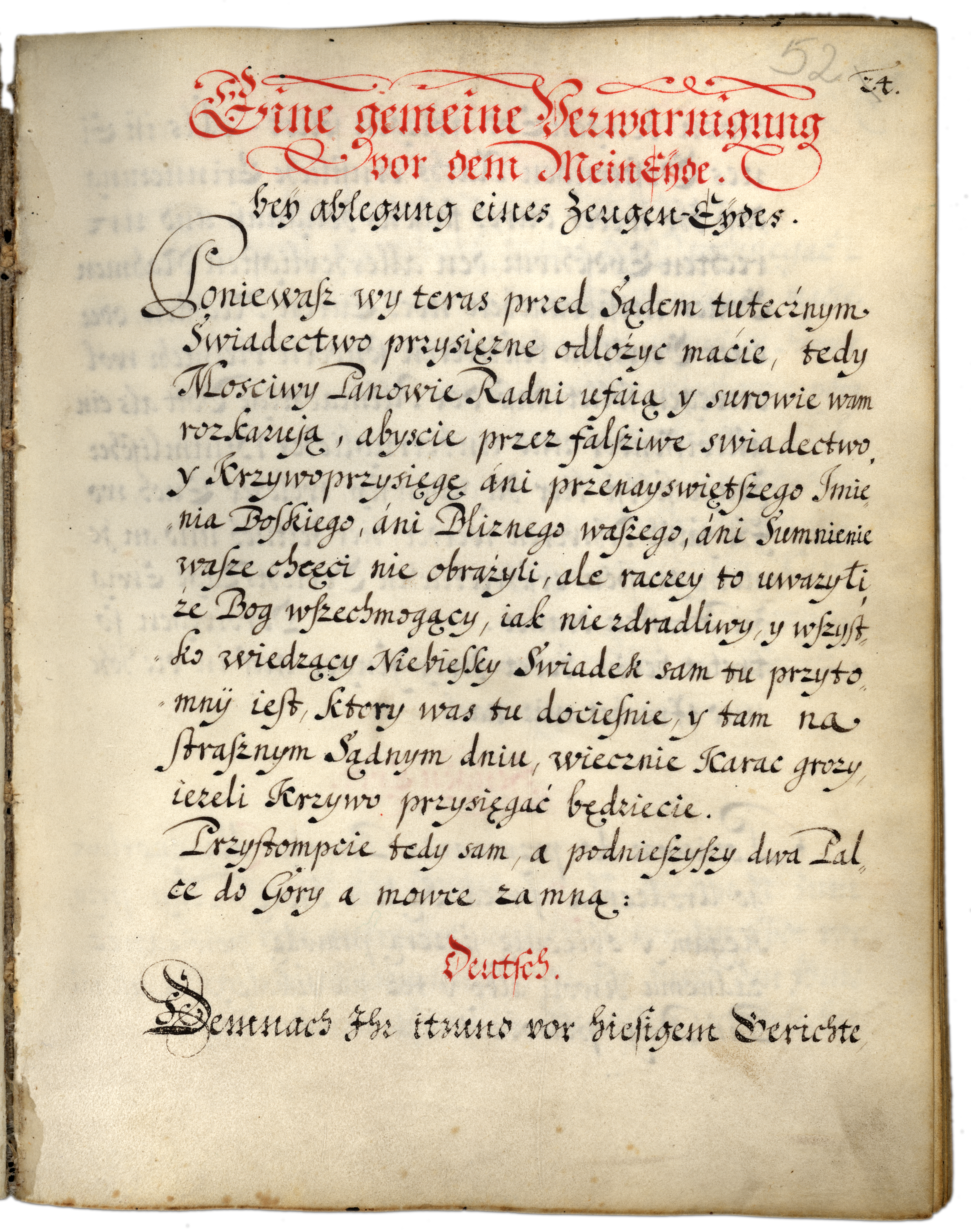
- 1702, Oath of Allegiance Taken in Court in the Polish Language in Wrocław, Lower Silesia
- Native to: Poland
- Region: Lower Silesia
- Ethnicity: Silesians
- Language family: Indo-European: Balto-Slavic; Slavic; West Slavic; Lechitic; Silesian; Lower Silesian dialect group
- Writing system: Latin (Polish alphabet)

Language codes
- ISO 639-3: –
- Glottolog: None

The Lower Silesian dialect group (Silesian: dolnoślōnske narzecze) is a dialect group of the Polish language historically spoken in Lower Silesia. It is difficult to establish if there are still speakers of this dialect group. The Lower Silesian dialect almost completely disappeared as a result of Germanization, whereas the Chwalim subdialect managed to survive, largely due to its proximity to the Greater Poland region.

This article normalizes to Ślabikŏrzowy szrajbōnek where possible, and sometimes examples are supplemented with IPA.

== History ==
In 1495 German bishop ordered the Polish peasants of the episcopal village of Wójcice in Lower Silesia, near Nysa, to learn German and stop speaking Polish within five years, threatening them with expulsion if they failed to comply.

“Until now, they have used almost exclusively a foreign language, Polish, and therefore are unable to express their needs or communicate with our officials except through interpreters (...) His Princely Grace has ordered that the inhabitants of Wójcice who speak Polish and have hitherto used the Polish language shall, within the next five years, learn and use German, refrain from speaking Polish, and conduct themselves accordingly.”

Barthel Stein, regarded as the first geographer of Silesia, described the region in his work Descriptio totius Silesiae et Civitatis regiae Vratislaviensis (Latin: Description of All of Silesia and the Royal City of Wrocław). Written around 1512, the work is cited as evidence of the longstanding presence of Polish-speaking inhabitants in Lower Silesia and the immigration of German-speaking settlers into the region. Stein also discussed the Polish origins of the names of major Silesian towns. Stein identified the Oder River as the linguistic boundary between Polish and German, dividing Wrocław into two linguistic areas, with German spoken more frequently on one side of the river and Polish on the other.

“Two peoples, differing both in their customs and in the territories they inhabit, live in this land. The Germans occupy the more fertile and better-cultivated western and southern parts, while the Poles inhabit the more heavily forested, less cultivated and poorer lands to the east and north. The Oder River, from its confluence with the Neisse, separates them as a most reliable boundary, so that even in the towns on this side German is spoken more frequently, while on the other side Polish is more commonly heard.”

The Silesian pastor Michael Kuschius wrote in his bilingual Polish–German dictionary, Wegweiser zur Polnischen und Deutschen Sprache (Guide to the Polish and German Languages), published in Wrocław in 1646:

“We are neighbours of the Poles, and every day we have dealings with them, and they with us, as with our closest and dearest neighbours, as brothers who can hardly do without us, nor we without them, in trade, in everyday life, in buying and selling.”

In 1666, the City Polish School (Miejska Szkoła Polska) was established in Wrocław for children from merchant families. During the 18th century, considerable amounts of Polish-language literature were published in Lower Silesia, predominantly religious works, as Polish was used as a liturgical language in churches and Protestant congregations. Bible translations, hymnals, liturgical literature and moral works were published in Polish. Authors such as Adam Gdacjusz and Jerzy Bock published books in Polish in Oleśnica. In 1673, the Polish-language Doskonały kancjonał polski (The Excellent Polish Hymnal), intended for the Polish population of Silesia, was published in Brzeg.

One of the first decrees issued by Frederick the Great after he had assumed complete control over Silesia was promulgated in Wrocław on 8 June 1764. It was directed against the use of the Polish language. The decree ordered the introduction of German as the official language and prohibited the employment in schools of teachers who did not speak German. It also prohibited estates from employing anyone who did not know German for work or service on their farms, under penalty of a fine of 10 thalers. Officials were even forbidden from granting permission for marriages unless the prospective spouses learned to speak German.

Restrictions were introduced on the use of Polish in schools and government offices. In a statement addressed to the district land councillors of the Wrocław, Brzeg, Niemodlin, Oława, Grodków, Nysa, Środa Śląska, Trzebnica, Oleśnica, Namysłów, Kluczbork and Syców districts, Frederick declared:

“(...) Since we earnestly desire that the German language should become increasingly widespread in those regions and localities where our subjects speak only Polish, Polish parish priests have therefore been instructed to acquire proficiency in German within one year. Polish teachers are to be dismissed, and their positions are to be taken by persons who understand both German and Polish and can teach the younger generation in German (...)”

Towards the end of the 18th century and throughout the 19th century, the development of German nationalism led to the questioning of the historical presence of Poles in Silesia. This provoked controversy and protests among inhabitants of Wrocław. In a pamphlet published in Wrocław in 1791, German pastor J. W. Pohl stood up for native Polish speakers in Silesia, he wrote:

“What, then, is the native language of Silesia? Surely it cannot be German? The names of towns and villages in a given country undoubtedly reveal what the common language was when they were founded. What do Glogau, Bunzlau, Wohlau, Jauer, Breslau and Brieg mean in German? In Polish, however, all these names have their meanings! Is it therefore an erroneous conclusion that, when these towns were founded, Polish was the regional language of Silesia? Could one not, with considerably greater justification, reproach a Lower Silesian for speaking German than an Upper Silesian for speaking Polish? Such is the ignorance displayed by your agitators, who denounce you so loudly. That which they condemn deserves praise. Truly, a nation is to be pitied when it is mocked for its mother tongue, for which it is not to blame, and when such mockery comes from people who lack everything necessary to make truthful and impartial judgments.”

== Phonology ==
Lower Silesian generally shows voicing of word-final consonants before vowels and liquids, but devoicing may sometimes occur. It also has Mazuration with sporadic exceptions.

=== Vowels ===
Clear a is generally kept as a: matka, zima, ziyima, and a few instances of older a are kept: rzazać, jachać. Tautosyllabic aj often changes to ej, especially in the imperative of verbs: cekejcie, dej; in other words this change happens more rarely or even exceptionally: dzisiej. A few surnames show -e instead of -a under German influence: Dude. The cluster ja- often changes to je-, something once more common in all of Silesia: jermark; it is uncertain if ra- similarly changes to re-. ar may change to er: cwiérć, trefić, presować. a can shift to e sporadically, but exceptionally: hesłe; the form kazelnica arose from contamination of kazalnica and Czech kazatelnica.

Clear o is generally kept as o: pole (Stare Kolnie), but can raise to slanted ō for various reasons. One source of this is when o is when it is with tautosyllabic r l ł, or in monosyllabic words or in singular accentual units: dō Francyje (Lubsza), fōrt (Tarnowiec), fōlwark (Roszkowice, Kurznie). There are also cases of sporadic raising: bō bōła, dō skōły (Tarnowiec), w kōpy, dō lasa (Kurznie) abō (Roszkowice), dōpaś, kōza||kōża /koʒa/ (Stare Kolnie), dō siecyniŏ, dō ŏdry (Karłowice), dō dōmu (Kuźnica Katowska); such cases can also occur in Southern Silesia, e.g. Rybnik and Pszczyna. Medial o can sporadically diphthongize to ŏ, realized as either /ɔ͡u/ or /o͡u/: kŏpetek ("piece") /ko͡upɛtɛk (Mąkoszyce) or kŏpytek /kɔ͡upɪtɛk/~/kɔpɪtɛk/ (Tarnowiec). Similarly, o can decompose into several segments, especially in the coda. One such realization is to [ɔ͡ɛ], but this is often weakly realized, and can differ somewhat in its exact realization village to village: lato, prziso (prziszło), wojsko, drzewo /dʐɛvɔ͡ɛ/ (Lubsza); this diphthongization made the adaption of Silesian surnames into German easier, where this diphthong was perceived as ö (/øː/) > e (/eː/). Next, this diphthong can very rarely raise further to [ɔ͡ɪ]: [ftɔ͡ɪ] (Stare Kolnie) (Standard Silesian fto), [palʲitɔ͡ɪ] (Karłowice) (Standard Polish palto). More frequently it is realized as [u͡ɛ], most frequently after coronal consonants and dorsal consonants, least often after palatal consonants: [stu͡ɛ] (sto), [tu͡ɛ] (to), [t͡su͡ɛ] (co), [ɕɛlu͡ɛ] (from ciało) (Stobawa); the development of this realization could have been [ɔ] > [ouɛ] > > [uuɛ] > [uɛ], with realizations like [xtouɛ] (Stobrawa) attesting the second stage. Also supporting this is the development of ło, which is very often realized as [uɛ], as in the past tense: [vɪɡlondawɛ] next to [bowɛ] (Lubsza). In some villages this can be realized as [wɪ~ɨ]. All of these diphthongs can occur medially, but less often, and the least often initially, where labial prothesis is more common. o can exceptionally change to a seemingly before r in loanwords: jarganki, jargany (Stobrawa), jarganka (Stare Kolnie) or also exceptionally to u: [kuluskoɛ]||[kɔluskoɛ] (Stare Kolnie) (diminutive of Standard Silesian kōłko).

u is generally remains unchanged, but before n it can lower to ō, e.g. pierōn (Stare Kolnie), and before r also to ō, but the phonetic realization here can be [o~ʊ], e.g. fōr [for] or [fʊr] (Tarnowiec). The cluster -łu- often simplifies to just -u-: chałpa, dziochy (Tarnowiec)., Standard Polish kukurydze)

Clear e is generally kept as e and also may occur in places different from Silesian or Polish: na całyj wieście (Stare Kolnie), na wiesce (Karłowice). German loanwords may be diphthongized: [kilome͡iter] (Lubsza), except after r: zech nie trefiōł (Kurznie). Other German loanwords containing ei show alternations of [ai]~[ei]||[ɪ], which is the result of being borrowed at different times: nie wyrychnie (< reichen) (Lubsza) next to nie rajchłe, fejfy (Kurznie), faifka (Stobrawa) (< Pfeife). A few cases of native ej show a similar change to y: podyma (Stare Kolnie). In contrast to Standard Silesian, the group er rarely changes to yr.

Ablaut is often leveled before hard coronals: Pietruske (Mąkoszyce), biedra, sie wygnietły, zabierã, bierã, niesã, niesõ, pierōn (Stare Kolnie), ôbierã (Karłowice), niesã, zaniesã, pierōny (Kuźnica Katowska). el can exceptionally raise to yl: mylŏk (Mąkoszyce). On the other hand, eł often changes to oł or ōł: połny||pōłny; this can also effect epenthetic e: bydōłecko (Stobrawa). Similarly, łe can change to ło: łoktać (Stare Kolnie). German loanwords containing eu are realized as aj: bajtlik (Stobrawa). Word final -e often diphthongizes to [ɔu].

y remains generally unchanged being realized as [ɘ~ɪ]; future forms of być show denasalization as in Standard Silesian. Initial or medial ły often changes to łō ([wo~wʊ]) or ō, uː zech susōł (standard Silesian żech słyszōł). Original -yjá nouns remain uncontracted as in Standard Silesian: procesyjŏ.

i may sometimes be realized as [ɪ] under influence of German. i may also appear after sz and ż in loanwords, possibly as the result of code-switching: na masziny, siby (Lubsza); this can happen in a few native words: lupszi (nominative singular) (Lubsza), kruszina, posziwać, sicko, wszycko (Standard Silesian wszyjsko). rzi (/r̝i~ʂi~ʐi/ remains as in Standard Silesian, but on occasion changes to rzy (/r̝iɪ~ʂɪ~ʐɪ/) under influence of Standard Polish. The cluster ir can become either er: siercy (Mąkoszyce, Tarnowiec) or yr: ściyrlica (Stobrawa). il lowers to yl: robiyli.

==== Slanted vowels ====
Slanted á shows much diversity; sometimes clear a can be seen under influence of Polish: piasek; á can rarely labialize to /ɔ͡a/, the most often in Lubsza: /dɔbrɔ͡a/ (standard Silesian dobrŏ); most often however old á is realized as represented by Silesian ŏ, as either /a͡u/ /ɔ͡u~o͡u/ or with de-diphthongization /ɔ/ - /ɔ͡u~o͡u/ is the most frequent realization: tŏcka (/ta͡ucka/ or /tɔ͡ucka/ or /to͡ucka/.(standard Silesian tŏczka).

Slanted ó is generally kept as ō (/o/) as in Standard Silesian in all villages, or is often diphthongized to [ou]. Sometimes this diphthong changes to [ɪ] with a process of [ou] > [ɪu] with raising from [u] and then weakening > [ɪ] with loss of the second element: [pkⱳɪf] (genitive plural of Standard Silesian błecha). There are a number of words where clear o is seen where typically slanted ō is seen: pōmoc (Standard Silesian pōmōc), skora (Standard Silesian skōra) (Tarnowiec). Slanted ō can raise to [u] or [ʊ] in pōł(-) and before r.

Slanted é is most often changed to y, and much less often after palatal consonants to i, but é can still rarely be heard; clear -e can be heard the least often under influence of Standard Polish.

==== Nasal vowels ====
Old short ę, historically pronounced [æ̃], is sometimes realized as [ã] after hard consonants and [ɪ̃] after soft consonants [kãs], [mjɪ̃sɔ] (Roszkowice) (Standard Silesian kyns, miynso); however [ã] can rarely be seen after soft consonants as well: wsańdzie (Tarnowiec), wsandy, wsańdzie, cãściyj (Kurznie), wsãdy, wsãdzie (Stare Kolnie), cãsto (Karłowice). More often old ę is realized as [ɪ̃] or yn: rynka (Wójcice). Nasality is sporadically lost in a few words. Final -ę continues as -ã: na drōgã, ziymiã (Lubsza) and exceptionally as [ɪ̃]. Sometimes final -ã can decompose to -an, especially before a following word: nie wiam, nie chcan zgubić (Lubsza); this likely occurred in the middle of the 20th century under German influence. Finally, word-final -ã can denasalize to [a ɛ e ɪ]. After World War I under Ruthenian or Russian influence final -ã can denasalize to -u.

Old long -ą, historically pronounced as [ɑ̃ː], is generally realized as õ ([õ]), powõchać (Stare Kolnie); word finally it decomposes to -ōm, however this final -m varies in strength, and -õ can also be seen: w niewolõ||sōmōm (instrumental singular of słoma) (Tarnowiec).

The distribution of ã and õ may differ from that in Standard Silesian. Nasality is lost before ł. Nasal vowels decompose to have a nasal consonant assimilating to the following consonant, including before sibilants, albeit to a lesser degree. Similarly, the vowel component has a tendency to diphthongize to include j, especially before a palatal consonant.

a can rarely change to e before nasal consonants, which can further raise to y like eN: wiōzynka (standard Silesian wiōnzōnka), z Polakiymi - this -'ymi likely arose under influence of the instrumental singular form Polakiym. More often, old á, both old and new, changes to ō before a nasal consonant, merging with oN: sōm /som/ (Wójcice), pamiyntōm /pamjɪntom/ (Lubsza), pōn /pon/ (Tarnowiec). This resulting ō can phonetically sometimes sound as [ʊ]: [bratʊnɛk] (Karłowice) or even [u]: [bratunɛk] (Stare Kolnie). Finally, aN is sometimes kept as aN or not raised entirely to just oN as the result of influence from Standard Polish from settlers coming from the Eastern Borderlands: geszpon /ɡɛʂpɔn/ (from German Gespann) (Lubsza), pan /pan/ (Lubsza, Tarnowiec).

o near nasal consonants generally raises to ōN, which can diphthongize or raise as described above, especially in a closed syllable, however sometimes clear oN can be seen.

The group eN raises to yN or sometimes to iN after palatal consonants.

iN lowers, approaching a sound between e and y: ś niymi (Standard Silesian z niymi) (Stobrawa).

Other vowels may nasalize when before m, especially when m is followed by a sibilant.

==== Prothesis ====
Initial a- exceptionally sees prothetic j- Jantka (accusative singular of Antek); this can also happen near secondary a-: jargany, jarganka; otherwise prothetic h- (either /h/ or rarely /x/) occurs more often: hantaba.

Initial, medial and final o can labialize and in all positions to a similar degree of intensity: môtycka (compare Standard Silesian motyka), môtycka, kôkôt (Mąkoszyce), na pôlu (Tarnowiec), sôli, zytô (Roszkowice), wôjna (Kurznie), kôkôt, kôtka, pokôwiec, sôchy, bôciōn, bôciōny, môc (Stare Kolnie), tô, cô, kokôt, kôt (Karłowice), dô, zytô (Karłowiczki), tô (Kuźnica Katowksa); this feature is not very frequent. This can sometimes be realized as [uɛ]: [uɛd uɔt͡sɪ] (Standard Silesian ôd ôjcōw) (Stobrawa), but most often as [uɔ]: ôdra, ôwiec (Stobrawa). However unlabialized initial o sometimes occurs: ojciec||ôjciec (Wójcice).

Medial u can also labializize to û when it occurs after another vowel: naûcyć (Lubsza), naûcyciyl, wyûcōny (Tarnowiec), my sie naûcyli (Roszkowice), poûgryzajõ (Stare Kolnie), naûcyciele (Karłowice), jŏ sie naûcōła (Karłowiczki); initially this may occur, but less frequently, and sometimes instead of labialization prothetic h may appear: [do hujɛk] (Mąkoszyce), [xujɛk] (Tarnowiec).

As a result of labialization, hypercorrection can occur and initial ł- may be removed: ōnka (instead of łōnka) (Tarnowiec).

Initial i- rarely gains prothetic j-: to jidã (Lubsza).

=== Contraction ===
Verbs may appear in contracted forms: stŏć /stɔ͡ut͡ɕ/ (Kuźnica Katowska), jŏ sie bŏł /jɔ͡u ʃɛ bow/ (Lubsza).

=== Consonants ===
Word final -m tends to weaken and either partially or fully nasalize the preceding consonant; this weakened element may then assimilate in the place of articulation to the following consonant; then final -m can sometimes entirely disappear: nie wiã (nie wiem) (Kurznie). Labial consonants tend to weaken and assimilate in consonant clusters and soft labials often harden. Similarly, the cluster in+sibilant can lose -n- and nasalize -i-.

Medial t and d after a vowel and before s, ś, c, ć often weaken and disappear. If rz is realized as /ʒ/ or /ʃ/, then trz and drz can affricatize and become cz, dż.

ł is pronounced as in Standard Silesian, that is /w/. Word- or syllable-final and sometimes intervocalic ł often weakens and can disappear. Similarly CłuC and to a lesser extent CłoC often lose ł, as in Standard Silesian: dugŏ (Lubsza). Word-final ł disappears most often when following another consonant: ûmar (Kurznie).

Raised rz (/r̝/) was kept, but only vestigially, and was often realized as /ʒ/ or /ʃ/. The clusters rs, rz, and sometimes rż can be realized as /ʃ/, /ʒ/, or even /r̝/.

Word final -ć is generally lost if it is preceded by a consonant, as in Standard Silesian. ć and dź can sometimes be realized as [t͡ʃ] and [d͡ʒ]. ć before a hard consonant changes to c: piyncset (Tarnowiec, Roszkowice, Stobrawa, Stare Kolnie, Karłowice, Kuźnica Katowska).

Palatal ń before a consonant or word-finally may gain before it or even change into [j].

Word final -ej usually raises to -yj, and occasionally -j is lost giving -y.

The cluster kt- usually weakens to cht-, as in Standard Silesian, less often to ft-. g can appear as ch or h, or sometimes disappear.

Initial ch- may be realized as h- ([ɣ~h]); this may also occur before l, but chl- may also change to l-. Medial -ch- often weakens to -h-. Word final -ch rarely changes to -f, mostly in the locative plural ending -ōf. Sporadically cht can change to kt: łoktać. ch after a sibilant and before a vowel or semivowel may change to ł: słody (Standard Silesian schody). The clusters chc, chć may change to sc, ść: scã (Standard Silesian chcã). Similarly chs can change to ss: lisse pole (Standard Silesian lichsze pole). Finally, ch can sometimes sporadically be lost.

h as /h/ can appear as a loaneme.

== Inflection ==
=== Nouns ===
The nominative singular continues old á as ŏ of some feminine nouns: braciŏ /brat͡ɕɔ͡u/ (Lubsza, Kurznie, Stare Solnie).

Feminine nouns originally ending in slanted -á can take old -e in the genitive singular: do Rusyje, dō Francyje(Lubsza), ziymie (Kurznie), groble, do prace (Stare Kolnie), z kuźnice (Karłowice), do kuźnice, wele gole (Karłowiczki), do studnie, zimie (Kuźnica Katowska). -e can also occur in the nominative plural of these nouns, and can even occur in clear -a nouns: kose, koze, ôse.

Neuter nouns originally ending in *-ьje may continue as -o under influence of -o neuter nouns or -y in the nominative and accusative singular: [gojskɔ͡ɛ ɕfjɪŋkwɛ] (from świnko), [ɕɛrt͡sɪ] (Mąkoszyce), [ɕɛrt͡swɛ], [zbɔzɔ] (Stare Kolnie), [d͡ʑɛt͡ɕɔ] (Karłowice).

Neuter nouns ending in -ã in Standard Silesian most often end in -y under influence of -y < *-ьje: ciely (Standard Silesian cielã).

The feminine accusative singular sometimes takes -ŏ, -o in place of -õ < -ã: ta wielkŏ maszina, heblowniŏ (Kurznie), na biblijŏ (Stobrawa), chomŏto (Stare Kolnie), cielnŏ krowa instead of cielõ krowã (Karłowiczki).

The genitive plural continues old á as ŏ in gerunds and collective nouns: zbozŏ /zbɔzɔ͡u/, biciŏ /bit͡ɕɔ͡u/, do mōcyniŏ /dɔ mocɪɲɔ͡u/, do wybijaniŏ /dɔ vɪbijaɲɔ͡u/ (Mąkoszyce).

The locative plural is most often formed with -ach (-af) or -ŏch (-ŏch): w lasŏf/w lasŏch (/v laso͡uf/ or w lasox/ in Stare Kolnie); compare a similar change in Goral dialects. The genitive plural may be formed with -ōw regardless of gender: za gōrōw (Mąkoszyce).

=== Adjectives, adverbs, pronouns, and numerals ===
The nominative/accusative(/vocative) plural of adjectives and pronouns (via leveling to adjectives) generally has -y, less often -e.

The feminine nominative singular continues old á as ŏ: lichŏ /lixɔ͡u/, wielkŏ /vjɛlkɔ͡u/ (Lubsza).

The masculine/neuter genitive/accusative animate singular tend to have -ygo after soft consonants and -ego after hard consonants, or also sometimes -ygo, with little fluctuation, somewhat more often in the neuter.

Pronouns tend to have clear -e- in the masculine/neuter genitive/accusative animate singular.

The genitive-dative-locative feminine singular of adjectives and pronouns show -yj.

Adverbs often end in -y instead of -e.

=== Verbs ===
Present tense stems also may continue old long á as ŏ: mŏ /mɔ͡u/ (Mąkoszyce), mŏcie /mɔ͡ut͡ɕɛ/ (Kurznie), wsŏdzŏ /fsɔ͡ud͡zɔ͡u/ (compare the infinitive of Standard Silesian wsŏdzać).

The past tense often sees -ŏ- from old slanted á: ukrŏd /ukrɔ͡ut/ chcioł /xt͡ɕɔw/ (Lubsza), przepŏd /pʂɛpɔ͡ut/ (Mąkoszyce), ôstoł /wɔstɔw/ (Tarnowiec, Roszkowice). The past tense of -yć verbs may be formed -ōł-: sie ûcōł (Lubsza), sie skōńcōła (Tarnowiec). Similarly, the past tense of -ić verbs, except masculine virile forms, can be either -'ył- jŏ mōwiył (Tarnowiec), -ōł: jŏ chodziōł (Lubsza).

The imperative is formed with -ej, as in standard Silesian.

The passive participle may continue -ŏ- and also be formed with -ty instead of -ny: ôbsiŏty /wɔpɕɔ͡utɪ/ (Kuźnica Katowska).

The infinitive of old -eć verbs may raise, powiedzić (Lubsza); patrzeć || wrzyć, potrzyć, ôdrzyć (Kurznie); dozdrzeć || ôjzdrzyć, zawrzyć, psziwrzyć (Stare Kolnie); zryć, ciyrpiyć (Karłowiczki), zryć || ôżeć (Kuźnia Katowska).

=== Prepositions and prefixes ===
Common is the extension of the prepositions w and z with mobile e to we and ze.

== Vocabulary ==
Lower Silesian seen influence from German and other tendencies common to other Silesian dialects.

=== Word-Formation ===
Many typical Silesian suffixes can be seen.

The non-verbal prefix nŏ- (<ná-) may often be seen as in Standard Silesian, but may also be realized as na-: nŏprzōd (/nɔ͡upʂot/) (Standard Silesian naprzōd) but nasiyniy (/na'çɪɲɪ/) (Standard Silesian nasiynie) - both examples are from Kurznie. Similarly zŏ- is often present: zŏpôta /zɔ͡upwɔta/, zŏgroda /zɔ͡uɡrɔda/ (Stobrawa), zŏrobek /zɔ͡urɔbɛk/, zŏgłōwkę /zɔ͡uɡwofkɪ̃/ (Stare Kolnie), zŏpōłka /zɔpowka/ (Karłowice), zŏrobek /zɔ͡urɔbɛk/, na zorobek /na zɔrɔbɛk/ (Karłowiczki).

==== Nouns ====
Some noun suffixes and their phonetic realizations include:

1. -ŏc: kōłŏc (/kowɔt͡s/ in Lubsza, /ko͡uwo͡ut͡s/ or /kɔwo͡uct͡s/ in Stare Kolnie) (Standard Silesian kołŏcz)
2. -ŏk: bijŏk ([bʲijɔ͡uk/ in Lubsza)
3. -ŏl
4. -ŏrz: handlŏrz (/xandlɔʂ/ in Wójcice), farŏrz (/farɔ͡uʂ/ in Stobrawa)
5. -ŏsek: chlebŏsek (/xlɛbɔ͡usek/ in Lubsza)
6. -yl: gordziyl (Stare Kolnie), naûcyciyl (Kurznie)

=== Adjectives, adverbs, pronouns, and numerals ===
The superlative of adjectives and adverbs is most often formed with nŏ-: nŏwiyncyj /nɔ͡uvjɪncɪj/ (Lubsza, Stare Kolnie), nŏmłodsy /no͡umwotsɪ/ (Tarnowiec), nŏlepsy /nɔ͡ulɛpsɪ/ (Roszkowice, Stobrawa, Karłowice, Kuźnica Katowska), nŏbarzyj /nɔ͡ubar̝ɪj/ (Kurznie, Kuźnica Katowska), nôlichsy /na͡ulixsɪ/ (Kuźnica Katowska). Numerals from old -naście continue as -nŏście.

==== Verbs ====
The verbal prefix nŏ- can be seen: nŏlezoł /nɔ͡ulɛzɔw/ (Kurznie), nŏlezałe /nɔ͡ulɛzawɛ/, przinŏlezy /pʂinɔ͡ulɛzɪ/ (Stare Kolnie).

The prefix s- instead of z- can still be seen, as in Standard Silesian: swalić [sfalit͡ɕ].

== See also ==
- Silesian orthography
- Silesian grammar

== Bibliography ==
- Wyderka, Bogusław (2010). "Zasięg terytorialny gwar śląskich". dialektologia.uw.edu.pl.
- Działas, Baltazar (1824). Działasa zbiór wyrazów szląsko-polskich.
- Bąk, Stanisław (1956). "Gwary ludowe na Dolnym Śląsku. Cz. 1, Głosownia". Prace Komisji Filologicznej. XV. Poznań: Poznańskie Towarzystwo Przyjaciół Nauk. Wydział Filologiczno-Filozoficzny.
