= Chwalim dialect =

Slavic dialect in Poland

- Native to: Poland
- Region: Chwalim
- Ethnicity: Chwalimiaks
- Extinct: First half of the 20th century
- Language family: Indo-European: Balto-Slavic; Slavic; West Slavic; Lechitic; Silesian; Lower Silesian; Chwalim dialect

Language codes
- ISO 639-3: –
- Glottolog: None

The Chwalim dialect (Polish: gwara chwalimska; Silesian: chwalimskŏ gŏdka) was a Lechitic dialect spoken up to the first half of the 20th century in Chwalim in present-day western Poland. Originally the village belonged to Greater Poland region, it was part of Poland until 1793, when during the Second Partition it was taken by Prussia. Although the dialect features are typical for Silesian, the speakers believed that they were descendants of Sorbs. The dialect is classified as a subdialect of Lower Silesian dialect group, it displays Greater Poland dialect influence.

== History ==
In the 19th century, the inhabitants of Chwalim were believed to be Wends who had migrated there from Lower Lusatia. Nevertheless, Kazimierz Nitsch, because of linguistic features of their dialect, believed that they were Silesians. From his visits to Chwalim in the early 20th century, he learned that the dialect is well known amongst elder people, while younger people had stopped learning it, instead opting for German, although they still understood it. According to a census in 1910, 117 natives in Chwalim still spoke the so-called "Wendish language". These speakers of Chwalim subdialect were Protestants visiting church in neighbouring town Kargowa and praying with Polish books.

Before 1945, they inhabited an area located directly along the Polish-German linguistic border. The Nazi administration, considered the Chwalimiaks an unreliable element because they spoke Polish, so they forcibly resettled the inhabitants of Chwalim further into Germany.

Ethnographers Adam Fischer and Jan Stanisław Bystroń also classified the inhabitants of the villages of Stare Kramsko and Nowe Kramsko as Chwalimiaks. However, Ludwik Gomolec explicitly challenged the identification of these two groups as belonging to the same ethnographic community. Despite their similar cultural characteristics, the inhabitants of these two villages were Catholic and did not call themselves Chwalimiaks.

== Phonology ==
The phonological system of the Chwalim dialect has much in common with other Silesian dialects, with some influences from Greater Poland dialects.

=== Consonants ===
The consonant system of Chwalim dialect is generally similar to that in Standard Polish, but there is a lack of the postalveolar/retroflex series due to mazuration, which is present in some other Silesian dialects as well. A weak prothetic [h] is usually inserted before initial /i/.

=== Vowels and diphthongs ===
Below, the acute accent denotes that the sound is a reflex of the corresponding Old Polish long vowel. It is also difficult to determine whether diphthongized vowels are phonemic diphthongs or not.

Oral vowels: a, e, i, y, o, u, á, é, ó.

Nasal vowels: ã, õ.

Allophony:

- á is usually realised as a diphthong [ou̯] but is reduced to [o] before nasal consonants or to more open [ɔ] before /w/ or /j/;
- é is generally pronounced as [ɘ̟], like in other Silesian dialects;
- The pronunciation of o can vary between [u̯ɔ] and [ɔɛ̯] depending on the phonological context. Generally, u̯ is strongest in the beginning of the word and weakest at the end of the word: [ˈk^{u̯}ɔvou̯l] 'smith', [r^{u̯}ɔˈb^{u̯}ɔt̪ä] 'work' (noun), [u̯ɔd̪ˈlʲɛt͡ɕä] '(she) flew away', [ˈmɔɛ̯d̪ɘ̟ɪ̯] 'young', [ˈs̪^{u̯}ɔvɔɛ̯] 'word'. In this article, letter ô is used to indicate pronunciation [u̯ɔ];
- y can be realised as a diphthong [ɘ̟i̯~ɘ̟ɪ̯] or monophthong [ɘ̟~ɪ] depending on the phonological context (usually, at the end of a word it is a diphthong). Before /w/ it is realised as [u̞];
- ó is usually realised as a diphthong [u̞ɵ̯] but is often reduced to [u̞] in unaccented syllables or before /w/;
- u is generally [u] as in most of Polish and Silesian dialects, but can be a bit more open [u̞] before /l/ and nasals;
- ã is generally pronounced as [ä̃];
- The pronunciation of õ can vary between [ɔ̃] and [õ];
- i and a are generally pronounced as [i] and [ä] respectively, as in most of Polish and Silesian dialects.

=== Evolution from Old Polish ===
In the list below, V denotes any vowel, C – any consonant, N – any nasal consonant, ogonek – nasal vowel and macron – long vowel.

- lack of final -aj > -ej, unlike in other Silesian dialetcs;
- ā > á, except in feminine noun endings -niā > -nia;
- ē > é, eN > éN. Sporadically ē, e > i: [ˈɲi‿mu̞k] '(he) couldn't', [ˈɲimʲɛt͡s̪] 'Protestant';
- ō > ó, oN > óN;
- y > i in few cases, mostly after /ts/;
- ą > ã, ą̄ > õ, ą̄ > õm word-finally;
- in comparative adverbs endings -ēj > -y
- irregular Silesian vowel changes: [ˈjɛgwä] – compare Polish igła 'needle', [ˈɲɛs̪ä̃] – compare Polish niosę '(I) carry', [ˈz̪ɛgʲɛr] : [ˈzɛgrä] (gen.) – compare Polish zegar : zegara 'clock', [vɛ ˈs̪ku̯ɔlɛ] – compare Polish w szkole 'in school', [vɛ ˈɔɛ̯strji] – compare Polish w Austrii 'in Austria';
- due to Greater Polish influence, -ew- after soft consonants is preserved: [ku̞ɵ̯ˈɲɛvʲi] 'horse (dative)', [ku̯ɔvou̯ˈlɛvʲi] 'smith (dative)', [vʲiɕˈɲɛvɛ] 'cherry (nueter)' (adjective);
- masuration is regular with a few exceptions: [ˈt͡ɕlɔvʲɛk] – compare Polish człowiek 'human', [ʑɛˈläz̪ɔ] – compare Polish żelazo 'iron'. /ʃ/ in recent German borrowings is adapted as /ɕ/;
- /ɫ/ > /w/ as in most of Polish and Silesian dialects;
- /w/ after consonants is often lost: /CwV/ > /CV/;
- between two vowels (unless first of them is o or á) /w/ is much weaker. If the vowels are the same or very similar, it can be even completely omitted, contracting the vowels: [ˈs̪u̯ɘ̟s̪ä] '(she) heard' – compare Polish słyszała, [ˈɲɛ‿brä] '(she) wasn't taking' – compare Polish nie brała, [ˈɲɛ‿z̪n̪ä] '(she) didn't know' – compare Polish nie znała, [u̯ɘ̟n̪ä s̪ä ˈbäː] 'she was here' – compare Polish ona tu była, [vʑä̃] '(she) took' – compare Polish wzięła;
- various simplifications of consonant clusters and palatalizations: [ˈs̪ɘ̟t͡ɕkɔɛ̯] 'all', [ˈps̪ɔwä] 'bee', [du̯ɔɕ] 'enough, fairly', [s̪ɛʑ‿ˈlou̯t̪] 'six years', [ˈʑbʲɘ̟räj] 'to collect' – compare Polish wszystko, pszczoła, dość, sześć lat, zbierać.

== Grammar ==
Many features common to Silesian dialects are present in the morphology, but some Sorbian influence may also be observed.

=== Declension ===
The most dominant ending for the genitive masculine singular genitive of nouns is -u. An archaic masculine singular dative ending -ewi is preserved after roots ending with soft consonant. The feminine singular accusative is generally formed with -ã.

The masculine and neuter singular genitive of adjectives is formed with the ending -yk from -ēgo, which is the result of Sorbian influence.

=== Conjugation ===
Verbs in the infinitive end in -j < -ć and -ś < -ść/-źć. Future forms of być ('to be') have d and dź simplified into corresponding nasal consonants n, ń as in other Silesian dialects: bãnõm, bãnie, – compare Polish będą, będzie.

Present tense endings are -ą/-ám for the first person singular, -my for the first person plural and -cie for the second person plural. The past tense is constructed from the l-participle and personal pronoun; in singular first person there can be added suffix -ch to personal pronoun ja, which is typical for Silesian: jach tam bół (I was there), jach słysa 'I heard (feminine)', my cytali (we were reading), bółś tam? (have you been there?/were you there (singular)). As in Polish and Silesian, special prefixes inform whether the aspect of the verb is perfective or imperfective. Future tense is constructed with 'to be' in future tense and infinitive form of verb: bãnõm piáj (they will be reading), my bãniemy piáj (we will be reading), or with a present-tense form of a perfective verb.

Conjugations of a few verbs:

- (h)iś 'to go' / pôj (perfective): (h)idõm (they go/they are going), (h)idźmy, (let's go (imperfective)), pódziémy (we will go), przisáł (he has come/he came);
- 'can': môgã (I can), móg (he could);
- 'to be': jes (he/she/it/there is), my sõm (we are), bãnie (he/she/it will), bãniemy (we will), bãnõm (they will), bół ((he) was), baa or bełe (she) was, beły (they were (feminine)).

== Vocabulary ==
Vocabulary
Word (simplified orthography)	Meaning	Nitsch's spelling	IPA transcription	Comment
baba	wife	baba	[ˈbäbä]	
biáły	white	b́ou̯yi̯	[ˈbʲɔwɘ̟i̯]	
bible	liturgical books	b́ible	[ˈbʲiblɛ]	
bulce	potatoes	bulce	[ˈbult͡s̪ɛ]	
cyga	goat	ciga	[ˈt͡s̪igä]	
dãbôki	deep	dąb^{u}oḱi	[d̪ä̃ˈbu̯ɔkʲi]	Sorbian influence.
dugi	long	duǵi	[ˈd̪ugʲi]	Comparative form: dlysyi̯ or dusyi̯.
dôś	much, many	d^{u}oś	[d̪u̯ɔɕ]	Polish dość means 'enough'.
dziéwcã	daughter	ʒ́yfcą	[ˈd͡ʑɘ̟ft͡s̪ä̃]	Polish dziewczę means 'girl'.
gupy	dumb	gupy^{i̯}	[ˈgupɘ̟ɪ̯]	
jachaj	to go (with a vehicle)	i̯aχai̯	[ˈjäxäj]	
jegiáłka	pin	i̯eǵou̯ka	[jɛˈgʲɔwkä]	
jegła	needle	i̯egu̯a	[ˈjɛgwä]	Characteristic Silesian word.
jeźdźôrô	lake	i̯eźʒ́^{u}or^{u}o	[jɛʑˈd͡ʑu̯ɔru̯ɔ]	Probably influenced by neighbouring Greater Polish dialects.
jezeli	if	i̯ezeľi	[jɛˈz̪ɛlʲi]	This word is used also to make questions. Thus, it replaced semantically Standard Polish czy.
knepa	button	knepa	[ˈkn̪ɛpä]	
kôkôt	rooster	k^{u}ok^{u}ot	[ˈku̯ɔku̯ɔt̪]	
latôś	this year	lat^{u}oś	[ˈlät̪u̯ɔɕ]	
ma	yes	ma	[mä]	
miałki	shallow	ḿau̯kȯ^{u̯} (feminine form)	[ˈmʲäwkʲi]	
miãskaj	to live; to reside (somewhere)	ḿąskai̯	[ˈmʲä̃s̪käj]	
nacõj	to begin	nacǫi̯	[ˈn̪ät͡s̪ɔ̃j]	
nie	no	ńe	[ɲɛ]	
nimiec	Protestant	ńiḿec	[ˈɲimʲɛt͡s̪]	Polish Niemiec means 'German (man)'.
ôbiéraj	to collect, to gather	u̯ɔb́yrai̯	[u̯ɔˈbʲɘ̟räj]	Polish uses prefix z-: zbierać.
ôciéń	shadow	u̯oćyń	[ˈu̯ɔt͡ɕɘ̟ɲ]	
ón	he	u̯yn	[u̯ɘ̟n̪]	
pára	a few	pȯ^{u̯}rą (accusative form)	[ˈpou̯rä]	Polish para means 'pair, two of something'.
piáj	to read	ṕoi̯	[pʲɔj]	Semantic change from 'to sing' to 'to sing with a liturgical book' to 'to read from a liturgical book' to ultimately 'to read'.
pôdwórek	yard	p^{u}odvůy̯rek	[pu̯ɔd̪ˈvu̞ɵ̯rɛk]	
psoła	bee	psou̯a	[ˈps̪ɔwä]	
sa	here	sa	[s̪ä]	Greater Polish influence.
siachta	box	śaχta	[ˈɕäxt̪ä]	
skło, sklanô	glass bottle	sku̯o, sklan^{u}o	[s̪ku̯ɔ], [ˈs̪klänu̯ɔ]	
stára	grandma	stȯ^{u̯}rȯ^{u̯}	[ˈs̪t̪ou̯rou̯]	Polish stara is feminine form for 'old'.
stáry	grandpa	stȯ^{u̯}ryi̯	[ˈs̪t̪ou̯rɘ̟i̯]	Polish stary is masculine form for 'old'.
tata	father	tata	[ˈt̪ät̪ä]	
terá	now	terȯ^{u̯}	[ˈt̪ɛrou̯]	
ôlica	door	u̯oľica	[u̯ɔˈlʲit͡s̪ä]	Polish ulica means 'street'. The semantic change probably influenced by southern Greater Polish dialects.
wadzi sie	to argue	vaʒ́i śe	[ˈväd͡ʑi‿ɕɛ]	
wielgi	big	v́elǵi	[ˈvʲɛlgʲi]	
zajitrô	day after tomorrow	zai̯itr^{u}o	[z̪äˈjitru̯ɔ]	
zawrzyj	to close	zavžyi̯	[ˈz̪ävʒ̺ɘ̟j]	
zegier	clock	zeǵer	[ˈz̪ɛgʲɛr]	
zielazô	iron	źelaz^{u}o	[ʑɛˈläzu̯ɔ]	

== Bibliography ==
- Nitsch, Kazimierz (1958). Wybór pism polonistycznych. Vol. IV. Pisma dialektologiczne. Z 5 mapami. Wrocław-Kraków: Zakład Narodowy im. Ossolińskich. pp. 171–188.
