= Alsen =

Alsen may refer to:

== Places ==
- Als Island, Denmark; called Alsen under Prussian/German administration (1864–1920)
- Alsen, North Dakota, US
- Alsen, South Dakota, US
- Alsen, Sweden, a parish and former municipality in Jämtland County, Sweden
- Alsen, a hamlet in Catskill, New York, US

== People ==
- Herbert Alsen (1906–1978), German operatic bass
- Elsa Alsen (1880–1975), Prussian-born American operatic soprano
