= Przeszkoda =

Przeszkoda may refer to the following places:

- Przeszkoda, Lubusz Voivodeship (west Poland)
- Przeszkoda, Masovian Voivodeship (east-central Poland)
- Przeszkoda, Podlaskie Voivodeship (north-east Poland)
