= Smolno Małe =

- Village
- Location within Poland
- Coordinates: 52°04′49″N 15°44′30″E
- Country: Poland
- Voivodeship: Lubusz
- County: Zielona Góra
- Gmina: Kargowa
- Population (approx.): 38

Smolno Małe [ˈsmɔlnɔ ˈmawɛ] is a village in the administrative district of Gmina Kargowa, within Zielona Góra County, Lubusz Voivodeship, in western Poland.
