= Chwalim =

- Village
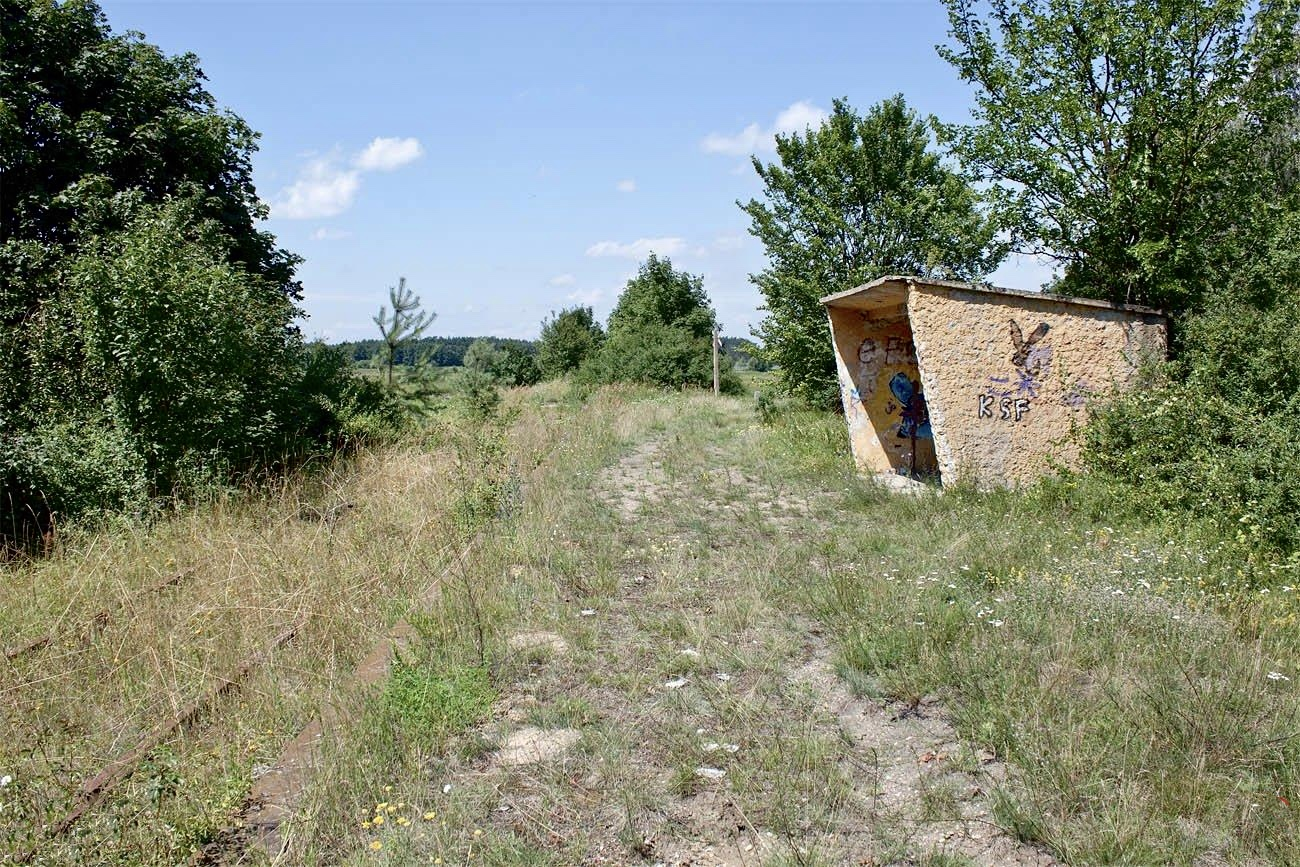
- Remains of Chwalim railway station in 2012.

- Location within Poland
- Coordinates: 52°4′1″N 15°49′9″E
- Country: Poland
- Voivodeship: Lubusz
- County: Zielona Góra
- Gmina: Kargowa
- Population (2022): 405
- Postal code: 66-120

Chwalim [ˈxfalim] is a village in the administrative district of Gmina Kargowa, within Zielona Góra County, Lubusz Voivodeship, in western Poland. It lies on the right (north-eastern) bank of the Obrzyca River, in the vicinity of national road No. 32 and a closed section of the railway line from Wolsztyn to Sulechów (Chwalim railway station). It is the seat of the Chwalim village council.. The village also used to speak the Chwalim dialect, which went extinct in the early 20th century.

== History ==
The village historically belonged to Greater Poland, has medieval records and has been recorded since the 15th century. It was first mentioned as Chwalny in 1408, Chwalym/Chwalim in 1418, Chwalimye in 1424 and Valim in 1444.

In 1408, the village belonged to the parish of Niałek Wielki, and later to the parish of Kopanica. Initially, the village was a noble property, and from 1440 also a clergy property, belonging to the Cistercian Abbey in Obra. The village had an oval shape and was founded in 1440. In 1467, it was located in the Kościan County of the Crown of the Kingdom of Poland.

In 1441, the chamberlain demarcated the royal tenures of Babimost and Kopanica with parts of the village of Chwalim, then belonging to the abbot of Obra and Nikl Kargowski. An incident occurred during the establishment of this boundary. When 40 mounds were raised on the border with Kopanica, the tenant Rudzki of Kopanica prevented the raising of further mounds. Ten mounds were raised on the borders of Chwalim with Krampsko Stare and Babimost, which was approved by the land court.

The village is recorded in numerous historical legal and tax documents. In 1513, King Sigismund the Old of Poland approved the division of the ancestral estates of Kargów and Chwalim, as well as the royal estates of Kopanica and others, between the brothers Wojciech and Jan of Żychlin. In 1515, the Kopanica tenant, Jan of Żychlin, owned, among other things, estates in Chwalim and Lake Białokosz. In 1519, King Sigismund the Old permitted Jan Kopanicki to bequeath 850 Hungarian złoty to his sister Anna, wife of Jakub Padniewski, the royal village of Wąchabno and his hereditary estates of Chwalim and Lake Białokosz. In 1516, Jan Reza of Kopanica sued the abbot of Obra because his men had harvested honey from beehives in the Sławim forest and taken two horses. In 1576, Jan Bylęcki, the Abbot of Obra, and Stanisław Żychliński divided some of the properties in the village and its surroundings between themselves: the Chwalimski Forest near Lake Tuchola, the forest beyond the Lubnica River near the hills called Szerszeliny, as well as meadows and new fields created after the cleared forest.

In 1571, the abbot of Obra paid a tax on half of Chwalim, based on 10 quarters of land, i.e., 2.5 settled lans, from 7 crofters without land, and from the inn. In 1581, Jan Bylęcki, abbot of Obra, paid a tax on 2 and 3/4 lans, one innkeeper's lan, from 11 crofters, 2 bailiffs, 11 fishermen, and a shepherd grazing 10 sheep. In 1581, the village was a clerical village, property of the Obra abbot, located in the Kościan district of the Poznań Voivodeship in the Polish–Lithuanian Commonwealth.

After the Swedish Deluge, the deserted village was populated by the Wends, who, however, did not merge with the – also Protestant – German population.

As a result of the Second Partition of Poland in 1793, the village came under Prussian rule. During the period of the Grand Duchy of Posen, the village mentioned as Chwalim was one of the larger villages in the then Kreis Bomst of the Posen region. Chwalim belonged to the Babimost Police District of that county and was part of the Kargowa estate, owned by the Prussian government in Berlin. According to the official census of 1837, Chwalim had 673 inhabitants, who lived in 132 houses (households). J. Bobrowicz notes that the village was the only one in the Babimost district inhabited at that time by "Slavs of Lutheran faith" (Chwalimiaks), whom Bobrowicz classifies as Lusatians (Wends). The inhabitants of Chwalim belonged to the Lutheran parish in Kargowa, where a service in Polish was held for them every two weeks. They were expelled by the Germans, as an uncertain element, in 1939.

During the Voivodeships of Poland (1975–1998), the town administratively belonged to the Zielona Góra Voivodeship (1975–1998).

== Bibliography ==
- Chmielewski, Stefan (1982). Słownik historyczno-geograficzny województwa poznańskiego w średniowieczu, cz. I (A – H), zeszyt 2, hasło „Chwalim” (in Polish). Wrocław: Ossolineum. pp. 233–235.
