= Kaliska, Lubusz Voivodeship =

Kaliska
- Settlement
- Location within Poland
- Coordinates: 52°05′24″N 15°44′43″E
- Country: Poland
- Voivodeship: Lubusz
- County: Zielona Góra
- Gmina: Kargowa

Kaliska [kaˈliska] is a settlement in the administrative district of Gmina Kargowa, within Zielona Góra County, Lubusz Voivodeship, in western Poland.
