= Szarki, Lubusz Voivodeship =

Szarki
- Settlement
- Location within Poland
- Coordinates: 52°01′18″N 15°54′23″E
- Country: Poland
- Voivodeship: Lubusz
- County: Zielona Góra
- Gmina: Kargowa

Szarki [ˈʂarki] is a settlement in the administrative district of Gmina Kargowa, within Zielona Góra County, Lubusz Voivodeship, in western Poland.
