= Nowy Jaromierz =

- Village
- Location within Poland
- Coordinates: 52°3′N 15°57′E
- Country: Poland
- Voivodeship: Lubusz
- County: Zielona Góra
- Gmina: Kargowa
- Population: 70

Nowy Jaromierz [ˈnɔvɨ jaˈrɔmjɛʂ] is a village in the administrative district of Gmina Kargowa, within Zielona Góra County, Lubusz Voivodeship, in western Poland. It has an area of approximately 2 km^{2} (1 sq mi).
