= Elsa Alsen =

American soprano

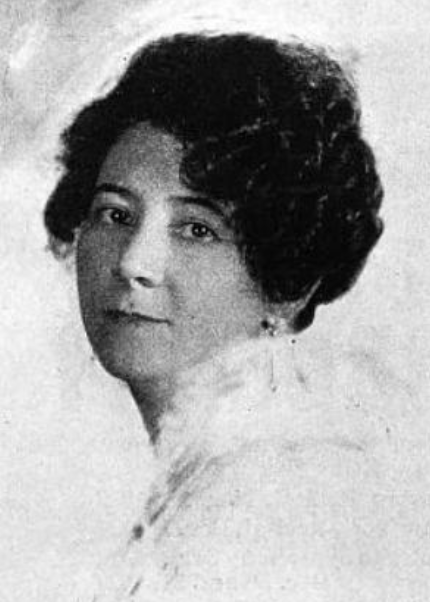
- Elsa Alsen, from a 1928 publication
- Born: 7 April 1880; Obra, Kingdom of Prussia, German Empire
- Died: 31 January 1975 (age 94); New York, U.S.
- Other names: Elsa Henneberger
- Occupation(s): Opera singer, concert singer, voice teacher

Elsa Alsen (7 April 1880 – 31 January 1975) was an American dramatic soprano and concert singer, born in Prussia, best known for her Wagnerian roles.

== Early life ==
Alsen was born in Obra, Prussia, the daughter of a French mother and Norwegian father.

== Career ==
Alsen made her operatic debut in 1902, in Heidelberg. She sang as a contralto early in her career, then as a dramatic soprano, often in Wagnerian roles, especially Brünnhilde and Isolde. She appeared with various German opera companies for twenty years before her American debut in 1923, while touring with the Wagnerian Opera Company. She sang with the Chicago Civic Opera Company from 1925 to 1928.

Alsen gave a concert at New York's Aeolian Hall with Georg Liebling in 1925. She was "acclaimed with deafening applause" at a 1928 appearance in Detroit, sang with the Washington National Opera in February 1928, and sang arias at the Milwaukee Sängerfest later that year. In 1929 she sang at a large Memorial Day event in Los Angeles. She was a "favorite" at the Hollywood Bowl by 1930, and in the 1930s she sang at four concerts with the Boston Symphony Orchestra, and was a concert soloist with Paul Althouse at several events, including a Sängerfest in St. Paul in 1932, and with the Baltimore Symphony Orchestra in 1934.

Alsen made several recordings in the 1920s, all on the Columbia label. She appeared in an early sound-era film, The Rogue Song (1930). She was featured on radio programs in the 1930s. She was appointed director of the Cecilia Music School of the Madonna House Settlement in 1937. She taught voice students in New York City, into her eighties.

== Personal life ==
Alsen married Richard Henneberger in 1913. She became a naturalized United States citizen in the 1930s. She died in 1975, at the age of 94, at a nursing home in New York City.
