= Stary Jaromierz =

- Village
- Location within Poland
- Coordinates: 52°04′37″N 15°56′09″E
- Country: Poland
- Voivodeship: Lubusz
- County: Zielona Góra
- Gmina: Kargowa
- Time zone: UTC+1 (CET)
  - Summer (DST): UTC+2 (CEST)
- Vehicle registration: FZI

Stary Jaromierz [ˈstarɨ jaˈrɔmjɛʂ] is a village in the administrative district of Gmina Kargowa, within Zielona Góra County, Lubusz Voivodeship, in western Poland.

== History ==
During World War II, on 26 January 1945, the Nazis murdered 38 Jewish women, who were unable to further walk during a death march from a just dissolved subcamp of the Gross-Rosen concentration camp in Sława.
