= Karszyn =

- Village
- Location within Poland
- Coordinates: 52°2′N 15°51′E
- Country: Poland
- Voivodeship: Lubusz
- County: Zielona Góra
- Gmina: Kargowa
- Population: 330

Karszyn [ˈkarʂɨn] is a village in the administrative district of Gmina Kargowa, within Zielona Góra County, Lubusz Voivodeship, in western Poland.
