= Dąbrówka, Lubusz Voivodeship =

Dąbrówka
- Village
- Location within Poland
- Coordinates: 52°01′34″N 15°49′06″E
- Country: Poland
- Voivodeship: Lubusz
- County: Zielona Góra
- Gmina: Kargowa

Dąbrówka [dɔmˈbrufka] is a village in the administrative district of Gmina Kargowa, within Zielona Góra County, Lubusz Voivodeship, in western Poland.
