= Smolno Wielkie =

- Village
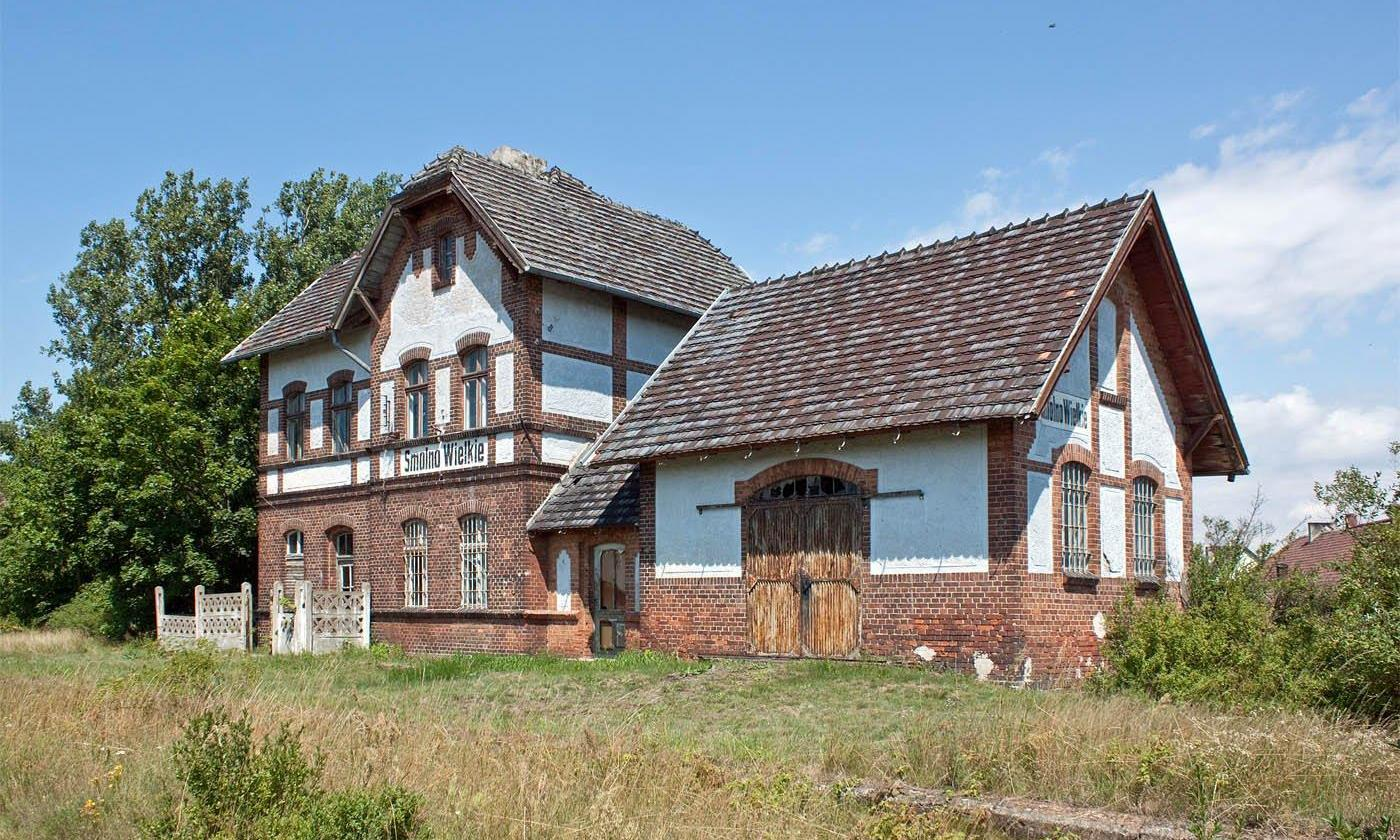
- Railway station

- Location within Poland
- Coordinates: 52°04′13″N 15°46′23″E
- Country: Poland
- Voivodeship: Lubusz
- County: Zielona Góra
- Gmina: Kargowa
- Population (approx.): 760

Smolno Wielkie [ˈsmɔlnɔ ˈvjɛlkʲɛ] is a village in the administrative district of Gmina Kargowa, within Zielona Góra County, Lubusz Voivodeship, in western Poland.
