= Gmina Kargowa =

Gmina Kargowa Kargowa Commune
- Gmina
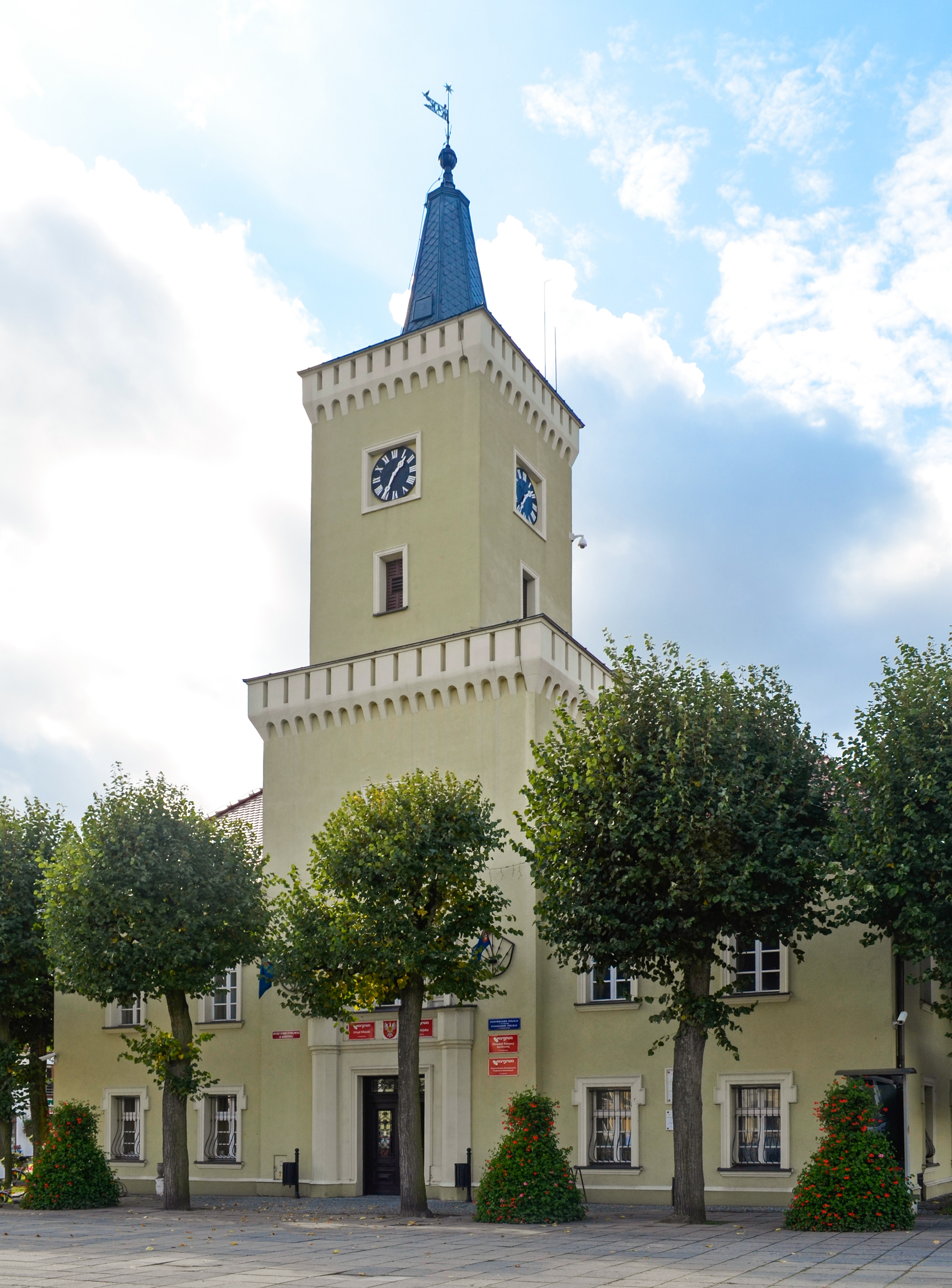
- Town Hall in Kargowa, seat of the gmina office

- Coat of arms

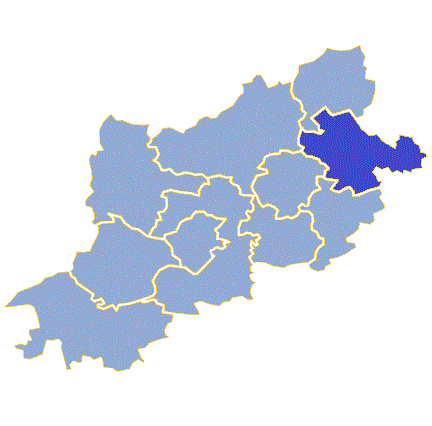
- Gmina Kargowa in Zielona Góra County
- Coordinates (Kargowa): 52°4′N 15°52′E
- Country: Poland
- Voivodeship: Lubusz
- County: Zielona Góra
- Seat: Kargowa

Area
  - Total: 128.47 km^{2} (49.60 sq mi)

Population (2019-06-30)
  - Total: 5,853
  - Density: 45.56/km^{2} (118.0/sq mi)
  - Urban: 3,769
  - Rural: 2,084
- Time zone: UTC+1 (CET)
  - Summer (DST): UTC+2 (CEST)
- Vehicle registration: FZI
- Website: kargowa.pl

Gmina Kargowa is an urban-rural gmina (administrative district) in Zielona Góra County, Lubusz Voivodeship, in western Poland. Its seat is the town of Kargowa, which lies approximately 29 kilometres (18 mi) north-east of Zielona Góra.

The gmina covers an area of 128.47 square kilometres (49.6 sq mi), and as of 2019 its total population is 5,853).

== Villages ==
Apart from the town of Kargowa, Gmina Kargowa contains the villages and settlements of Chwalim, Dąbrówka, Kaliska, Karszyn, Nowy Jaromierz, Obra Dolna, Przeszkoda, Smolno Małe, Smolno Wielkie, Stary Jaromierz, Szarki and Wojnowo.

== Neighbouring gminas ==
Gmina Kargowa is bordered by the gminas of Babimost, Bojadła, Kolsko, Siedlec, Sulechów, Trzebiechów and Wolsztyn.

== Twin towns – sister cities ==
Gmina Kargowa is twinned with:

- Schulzendorf, Germany
