= Obra Dolna =

- Village
- Location within Poland
- Coordinates: 52°03′38″N 15°58′29″E
- Country: Poland
- Voivodeship: Lubusz
- County: Zielona Góra
- Gmina: Kargowa

Obra Dolna [ˈɔbra ˈdɔlna] is a village in the administrative district of Gmina Kargowa, within Zielona Góra County, Lubusz Voivodeship, in western Poland.
