= Przeszkoda, Lubusz Voivodeship =

Przeszkoda
- Settlement
- Location within Poland
- Coordinates: 52°05′43″N 15°51′25″E
- Country: Poland
- Voivodeship: Lubusz
- County: Zielona Góra
- Gmina: Kargowa

Przeszkoda [pʂɛʂˈkɔda] is a settlement in the administrative district of Gmina Kargowa, within Zielona Góra County, Lubusz Voivodeship, in western Poland.
