= Silesian grammar =

Grammar of the Silesian language

The grammar of the Silesian language is characterized by a high degree of inflection, and has relatively free word order, although the dominant arrangement is subject–verb–object (SVO). There commonly are no articles, and there is frequent dropping of subject pronouns. Distinctive features include the different treatment of masculine personal nouns in the plural, and the complex grammar of numerals and quantifiers.

== Regular morphological alternation ==
Silesian exhibits regular consonant and vowel alteration that can be found across Slavic languages and more specifically Lechitic languages. These include the Slavic palatalizations, as well as vowel alterations result from historic "pochylone" or "slanted" vowels, which were the result from historically long vowels.

== Nouns ==
Silesian retains the Slavic system of cases for nouns, pronouns, and adjectives. There are seven cases: nominative (mianownik), genitive (dopołniŏcz), dative (cylownik), accusative (biernik), vocative (wołŏcz), locative (miyjscownik), and instrumental (nŏrzyndnik).

=== Number ===
Silesian has two number classes: singular and plural.

A few nouns display irregularities resulting from a fossilized dual form, namely in:

- body parts that naturally come in pairs have synchronically irregular plural and other forms
  - ôko ("eye") – pl. ôczy
  - rynka ("hand, arm") – pl. rynce
  - ucho ("ear") – pl. uszy

=== Gender ===
Silesian, like other Lechitic languages, has three genders in the singular (masculine mynski, feminine żyński, and neuter nijaki). The masculine gender can be divided into three subgenders, masculine personal (mynski ôsobowy), masculine animal (mynski zwierzyncy), and masculine inanimate (mynski rzeczowy). "Tantum plurale" or "plural only" nouns can be divided into virile (mynskoôsobowego) and non-virile (niymynskoôsobowego).

The following tables show this distinction using as examples the nouns syn 'son' (masc. personal), ptŏk 'bird' (masc. animate), cios 'hit, blow' (masc. inanimate), drōga 'road' (feminine), ciasto 'cake' (neuter). The following table presents examples of how a determiner tyn/ta/to ("this") agrees with nouns of different genders in the nominative and the accusative, both singular and plural. Adjectives inflect similarly to this determiner.

		singular		plural	
		nom.	acc.	nom.	acc.
masculine	personal	tyn syn tyn ptŏk tyn cios	tego syna tego ptŏka	ci synowie	tych synōw
masculine	animate	tyn syn tyn ptŏk tyn cios	tego syna tego ptŏka	te psy te ciosy te drōgi te ciasta	
masculine	inanimate	tyn syn tyn ptŏk tyn cios	tyn cios	te psy te ciosy te drōgi te ciasta	
feminine		ta drōga	tã drōgã	te psy te ciosy te drōgi te ciasta	
neuter		to ciasto		te psy te ciosy te drōgi te ciasta	

For verbs, the distinction is only important for past forms in the plural, as in the table below:

		singular	plural
masculine	personal	syn leżoł ptŏk leżoł cios leżoł	synowie leżeli
masculine	animate	syn leżoł ptŏk leżoł cios leżoł	ptŏki leżały ciosy leżały drōgi leżały ciasta leżały
masculine	inanimate	syn leżoł ptŏk leżoł cios leżoł	ptŏki leżały ciosy leżały drōgi leżały ciasta leżały
feminine		drōga leżała	ptŏki leżały ciosy leżały drōgi leżały ciasta leżały
neuter		ciasto leżało	ptŏki leżały ciosy leżały drōgi leżały ciasta leżały

The numeral dwa ("two"), on the other hand, behaves differently, merging masculine non-personal with neuter, but not with feminine:

		plural	
		nom.	acc.
masculine	personal	dwa synowie	dwōch synōw
masculine	animate	dwa ptŏki dwa ciosy dwa ciasta	
masculine	inanimate	dwa ptŏki dwa ciosy dwa ciasta	
neuter		dwa ptŏki dwa ciosy dwa ciasta	
feminine		dwie drōgi	

Gender can usually be inferred from the ending of a noun.

Masculine:

- masculine nouns typically end in a consonant
- some nouns, describing people, end in -a, specifically:
  - all nouns ending in -sta, equivalent to English "-ist", e.g. gardzista ("guardsman")

Feminine:

- feminine nouns typically end in -a
- some nouns end in a soft or hardened consonant:
  - all abstract nouns ending in -ść, e.g. miyłość ("love")
  - some concrete nouns ending in -ść: kiść ("bunch")
  - -c: moc ("power"), noc ("night")
  - -cz rzecz ("thing")
  - -ć: płeć ("sex, gender")
  - -dź: łōdź ("boat")
  - -j: kolyj ("railway")
  - -l: myśl ("thought")
  - -ń: jesiyń ("autumn, fall")
  - -rz: twŏrz ("face")
  - -sz: mysz ("mouse")
  - -ś: gynś ("goose")
  - -ź: gałōńź ("branch")
  - -ż: modziyż ("youth")
  - -w: krew ("blood")
- words ending in -niŏ and -ni are feminine, e.g. boginiŏ ("goddess"); also pani ("Mrs")

Neuter:

- neuter nouns typically end in -o
- verbal nouns, which are always neuter, end in -e, e.g. robiynie etc.
- Baby animals ending in -ã are always neuter, e.g. cielã ("calf")
- Latin loanwords ending in -um : invariable in the singular, declinable in the plural by removing the -um ending and replacing it by neuter plural endings; the genitive plural is in -ōw contrary to other neuters that have no ending → muzeum, muzea (N. pl.), muzeōw (G. pl.)

==== Semantic membership ====
The distinction between personal, animate and inanimate nouns within masculine nouns is largely semantic, although not always.

Personal nouns are comprised by human nouns such as 'man' or chop 'man'.

Animate nouns are largely comprised by animals such as pies ("dog"), many members from other life domains, as well as a number of objects associated with human activity. On the morphological level however, such nouns are only partially similar to animate nouns, having their accusative identical to their genitive only in the singular.

Masculine personal nouns can be "downgraded" to masculine animate nouns, called the deprecative form.

- Synowie szli → syny szły (sons were walking).

Plants and objects ending in a consonant are masculine inanimate.

=== Declension ===
Declensions are generally divided into hard and soft declensions. Soft declensions are used when the stem of the noun ends in a soft (postalveolar or palatal-like) consonant in all forms, while hard declensions are used by nouns with stems ending in a hard consonant in some (but not necessarily all) forms.

The following generalizations can be made for the inflection of all nouns:

- The nominative and vocative plural are always identical.
- For neuter nouns, the nominative, accusative and vocative are always identical in both singular and plural.
- The accusative of masculine nouns is identical to either the nominative or the genitive.
- The locative, dative and instrumental plural almost always have the same endings (-ach, -ōm, -ami/-ōma) no matter how the noun is declined. The form -ōma is used mostly in the north-western part of Silesia.

==== Declension I ====
This group comprises nouns ending in -a and -ŏ. This is predominantly feminine nouns, with a few masculine nouns (in the singular).

===== Class 1 =====
	Hard declension		Soft declension	
	Singular	Plural	Singular	Plural
Nominative (mianownik)	gŏdka, poeta	gŏdki, poety/poeci	kuźnia, granica	kuźnie, granice
Genitive (dopołniŏcz)	gŏdki, poety	gŏdek∅, poetōw	kuźnie, granice	kuźniōw/kuźni, granic∅
Dative (cylownik)	gŏdce, poecie	godkōm, poetōm	kuźni, granicy	kuźniōm, granicōm
Accusative (biernik)	gŏdkã, poety/poetã	gŏdki, poetōw	kuźniã, granicã	kuźnie, granice
Vocative (wołŏcz)	gŏdko, poeto	gŏdki, poety/poeci	kuźnio, granico	kuźnie, granice
Locative (miyjscownik)	gŏdce, poecie	gŏdkach, poetach	kuźni, granicy	kuźniach, granicach
Instrumental (nŏrzyndnik)	gŏdkōm, poetōm	gŏdkami/gŏdkōma, poetami/poetōma	kuźniōm, granicōm	kuźniami/kuźniōma, granicami/granicōma

===== Class 2 =====
	-ijŏ		-yjŏ		-ŏ	
	Singular	Plural	Singular	Plural	Singular	Plural
Nominative (mianownik)	armijŏ	armije	historyjŏ	historyje	mszŏ	msze
Genitive (dopołniŏcz)	armije	armijōw	historyje	historyjōw	mszy/msze	mszōw
Dative (cylownik)	armiji	armijōm	historyji	historyjōm	mszy	mszōm
Accusative (biernik)	armijõ	armije	historyjõ	historyje	mszõ	msze
Vocative (wołŏcz)	armijo	armije	historyjo	historyje	mszo	msze
Locative (miyjscownik)	armiji	armijach	historyji	historyjach	mszy	mszach
Instrumental (nŏrzyndnik)	armijōm	armijami/armijōma	historyjōm	historyjami/historyjōma	mszōm	mszami/mszōma

==== Declension II ====
This group comprises nouns ending in -o, -e, and -ã. This group is comprised without exception of neuter nouns.

===== Class 1 =====
	Hard declension		Soft declension	
	Singular	Plural	Singular	Plural
Nominative (mianownik)	gniŏzdo, pole	gniŏzda, pola	czytanie, życie	czytania, życia
Genitive (dopołniŏcz)	gniŏzda, pola	gniŏzd∅/gniŏzdōw, pōl∅	czytaniŏ, życiŏ	czytań∅, żyć∅
Dative (cylownik)	gniŏzdu, polu	gniŏzdōm, polōm	czytaniy, życiu	czytaniōm, życiōm
Accusative (biernik)	gniŏzdo, pole	gniŏzda, pola	czytanie, życie	czytania, życia
Vocative (wołŏcz)	gniŏzdo, polo	gniŏzdy, poly	czytanio, życio	czytanie, życie
Locative (miyjscownik)	gniŏździe, polu	gniŏzdach, polach	czytaniu, życiu	czytaniach, życiach
Instrumental (nŏrzyndnik)	gniŏzdym, polym	gniŏzdami/gniŏzdōma, polami/polōma	czytaniym, życiym	czytaniami/czytaniōma, życiami/życiōma

===== Class 2 =====
	-t- stems		-n- stems	
	Singular	Plural	Singular	Plural
Nominative (mianownik)	cielã	cielynta	ramiã	ramiōna
Genitive (dopołniŏcz)	cielyncia	cielynt∅	ramiynia	ramiōn∅
Dative (cylownik)	cielynciu	cielyntōm	ramiyniu	ramiōnōm
Accusative (biernik)	cielã	cielynta	ramiã	ramiōna
Vocative (wołŏcz)	cielã	cielynta	ramiã	ramiōna
Locative (miyjscownik)	cielynciu	cielyntach	ramiyniu	ramiōnach
Instrumental (nŏrzyndnik)	cielynciym	cielyntami/cielyntōma	ramiyniym	ramiōnami/ramiōnōma

==== Declension III ====
This group comprises nouns ending in consonants and have -u or -a in the genitive singular. This pattern is exclusively masculine nouns, including masculine person, animal, and inanimate.

===== Class 1 =====
Hard stems

	Masculine personal		Masculine animal	
	Singular	Plural	Singular	Plural
Nominative (mianownik)	bajtel∅	bajtle	kot∅	koty
Genitive (dopołniŏcz)	bajtla	bajtli/bajtlōw	kota	kotōw
Dative (cylownik)	bajtlowi	bajtlōm	kotu	kotōm
Accusative (biernik)	bajtla	bajtli/bajtlōw	kota	koty
Vocative (wołŏcz)	bajtlu	bajtle	kocie	koty
Locative (miyjscownik)	bajtlu	bajtlach	kocie	kotach
Instrumental (nŏrzyndnik)	bajtlym	bajtlami/bajtlōma	kotym	kotami/kotōma

Soft stems

	Masculine personal		Masculine animal	
	Singular	Plural	Singular	Plural
Nominative (mianownik)	złodziyj∅	złodzieje	kōń∅	kōnie
Genitive (dopołniŏcz)	złodzieja	złodzieji/złodziejōw	kōnia	kōni
Dative (cylownik)	złodziejowi	złodziejōm	kōniowi	kōniōm
Accusative (biernik)	złodzieja	złodziejōw	kōnia	kōnie
Vocative (wołŏcz)	złodzieju	złodzieje	kōniu	kōnie
Locative (miyjscownik)	złodzieju	złodziejach	kōniu	kōniach
Instrumental (nŏrzyndnik)	złodziejym	złodziejami/złodziejōma	kōniym	kōniami/kōniōma

===== Class 2 =====
Hard stems

	Masculine inanimate			
	Singular	Plural	Singular	Plural
Nominative (mianownik)	gniyw∅	gniywy	ancug∅	ancugi
Genitive (dopołniŏcz)	gniywu	gniywōw	ancuga	ancugōw
Dative (cylownik)	gniywowi	gniywōm	ancugowi	ancugōm
Accusative (biernik)	gniyw∅	gniywy	ancug∅	ancugi
Vocative (wołŏcz)	gniywie	gniywy	ancugu	ancugi
Locative (miyjscownik)	gniywie	gniywach	ancugu	ancugach
Instrumental (nŏrzyndnik)	gniywym	gniywami/gniywōma	ancugiym	ancugami/ancugōma

Soft stems

	Masculine inanimate			
	Singular	Plural	Singular	Plural
Nominative (mianownik)	grzebiyn∅	grzebiynie	kafyj∅	kafyje
Genitive (dopołniŏcz)	grzebiynia	grzebiynii	kafyju	kafyjōw
Dative (cylownik)	grzebiyniowi	grzebiyniōm	kafyjowi	kafyjōm
Accusative (biernik)	grzebiyń∅	grzebiynie	kafyj∅	kafyje
Vocative (wołŏcz)	grzebiyniu	grzebiynie	kafyju	kafyje
Locative (miyjscownik)	grzebiyniu	grzebiyniach	kafyju	kafyjach
Instrumental (nŏrzyndnik)	grzebiyniym	grzebiyniami/grzebiyniōma	kafyjym	kafyjami/kafyjōma

==== Declension IV ====
This group comprises nouns ending in -∅ have -i/-y or -e in the genitive singular. This is exclusively feminine nouns.

	Soft declension	
	Singular	Plural
Nominative (mianownik)	jakość∅, jesiyń∅, mysz∅, krew∅	jakości, jesiynie, myszy, krwie
Genitive (dopołniŏcz)	jakości, jesiyni, mysz∅, krwie	jakości, jesiyni, myszy, krwi
Dative (cylownik)	jakości, jesiyni, myszy, krwi	jakościōm, jesiyniōm, myszōm, krwiōm
Accusative (biernik)	jakość∅, jesiyń∅, mysz∅, krew∅	jakości, jesiynie, myszy, krwie
Vocative (wołŏcz)	jakości, jesiyni, myszy, krwi	jakości, jesiynie, myszy, krwie
Locative (miyjscownik)	jakości, jesiyni, myszy, krwi	jakościach, jesiyniach, myszach, krwiach
Instrumental (nŏrzyndnik)	jakościōm, jesiyniōm, myszōm, krwiōm	jakościami/jakościōma, jesiyniami/jesiyniōma, myszami/myszōma, krwiami/krwiōma

==== Declension V ====
This group comprises nouns with adjectival declension, and can be masculine or feminine, taking the appropriate gender ending. See adjectives and adverbs.

==== Declension VI ====
This group comprises nouns ending in -um in the singular and neuter declensions in the plural. Nouns in this group are neuter.

===== Class I =====
	Soft declension	
	Singular	Plural
Nominative (mianownik)	muzeum∅, cyntrum∅	muzea, cyntra
Genitive (dopołniŏcz)	muzeum∅, cyntrum∅	muzeōw, cyntrōw
Dative (cylownik)	muzeum∅, cyntrum∅	muzeōm, cyntrōm
Accusative (biernik)	muzeum∅, cyntrum∅	muzea, cyntra
Vocative (wołŏcz)	muzeum∅, cyntrum∅	muzea, cyntra
Locative (miyjscownik)	muzeum∅, cyntrum∅	muzeach, cyntrach
Instrumental (nŏrzyndnik)	muzeum∅, cyntrum∅	muzeami/muzeōma, cyntrami/cyntrōma

===== Class 2 =====
	Soft declension
Plural
Nominative (mianownik)	pleca, bryle, spodniŏki, galŏty
Genitive (dopołniŏcz)	plecōw/plyc∅, bryli/brylōw, spodniŏkōw, galŏt∅/galŏtōw
Dative (cylownik)	plecōm, brylōm, spodniŏkōm, galŏtōm
Accusative (biernik)	pleca, bryle, spodniŏki, galŏty
Vocative (wołŏcz)	pleca, bryle, spodniŏki, galŏty
Locative (miyjscownik)	plecach, brylach, spodniŏkach, galŏtach
Instrumental (nŏrzyndnik)	plecami/plecōma, brylami/brylōma, spodniŏkami/spodniŏkōma, galŏtami/galŏtōma

== Adjectives and adverbs ==
Adjectives agree with the noun they modify in terms of gender, number and case. In the nominative masculine virile plural the stem undergoes a softening change, e.g.

1. -ry → -rzi
2. -ki → -cy
3. -gi → -dzy
4. -ty → -ci
5. -dy → -dzi
6. -ny → -ni

=== Class 1 ===
Hard stems

Case	Singular number				Plural number	
Case	Masculine animate mynski ôsobowy	Masculine inanimate mynski rzeczowy	Neuter nijaki	Feminine żyński	Masculine personal mynskoôsobowy	Not masculine personal niymynskoôsobowy, i.e. masculine impersonal, feminine, and neutral
Nominative (mianownik)	chory		chore	chorŏ	chorzi	chore
Vocative (wołŏcz)	chory		chore	chorŏ	chorzi	chore
Accusative (biernik)	chorego	chory	chore	chorõ	chorych	chore
Instrumental (nŏrzyndnik)	chorym			chorōm	chorymi	
Locative (miyjscownik)	chorym			choryj	chorych	
Genitive (dopołniŏcz)	chorego			choryj	chorych	
Dative (cylownik)	chorymu			choryj	chorym	

=== Class 2 ===
Soft stems

Case	Singular number				Plural number	
Case	Masculine animate mynski ôsobowy	Masculine inanimate mynski rzeczowy	Neuter nijaki	Feminine żyński	Masculine personal mynskoôsobowy	Not masculine personal niymynskoôsobowy, i.e. masculine impersonal, feminine, and neutral
Nominative (mianownik)	wysoki		wysokie	wysokŏ	wysocy	wysokie
Vocative (wołŏcz)	wysoki		wysokie	wysokŏ	wysocy	wysokie
Accusative (biernik)	wysokigo	wysoki	wysokie	wysokõ	wysokich	wysokie
Instrumental (nŏrzyndnik)	wysokim			wysokōm	wysokimi	
Locative (miyjscownik)	wysokim			wysokij	wysokich	
Genitive (dopołniŏcz)	wysokigo			wysokij	wysokich	
Dative (cylownik)	wysokimu			wysokij	wysokim	

Most short non-relational adjectives have a comparative form in -szy or -iejszy, (e.g. dugy → dugszy and a superlative obtained by prefixing noj- to the comparative (e.g. dugszy → nojdugszy. For adjectives that do not have these forms, the words barzij ("more") and nojbarzij ("most") are used before the adjective to make comparative and superlative phrases.

Adverbs are formed from adjectives with the ending ie, or in some cases -o (e.g. dugi → dugo. Comparatives of adverbs are formed (where they exist) with the ending -(i)yj (e.g. dugo → dużyj). Superlatives have the prefix noj- as for adjectives (dużyj → nojdużyj).

== Pronouns ==
The personal pronouns of Silesian (nominative forms) are jŏ ("I"), ty ("you", singular, familiar), ŏn ("he", or "it" corresponding to masculine nouns), ŏna ("she", or "it" corresponding to feminine nouns), ŏno ("it" corresponding to neuter nouns), my ("we"), wy ("you", plural, familiar), ŏni (virile "they" – see Noun syntax below), ŏne (non-virile "they").

The polite second-person pronouns are the same as the nouns pōn ("gentleman, Mr"), pani ("lady, Mrs") and their plurals panowie, panie. The mixed-sex plural is państwo. All second-person pronouns are often capitalized for politeness, in letters etc.

Case	Singular							Plural						
Case	1st	2nd			3rd			1st	2nd				3rd	
Case	1st	fam.	polite		masc.	neut.	fem.	1st	fam.	polite			masc. pers.	non- masc.
Case	1st	fam.	masc.	fem.	masc.	neut.	fem.	1st	fam.	masc.	epic.	fem.	masc. pers.	non- masc.
Nominative/vocative (mianownik/wołŏcz)	jŏ	ty	pōn	pani	ôn	ôno	ôna	my	wy	panowie	państwo	panie	ôni	ône
Genitive (dopołniŏcz)	mie	ciebie/ciã/cie	pana	pani	ônego/niego/(je)go	ônego/niego/(je)go	ônyj/nij/jij	nŏs	wŏs	panów	państwa	pań	ônych/(n)ich	ônych/(n)ich
Dative (cylownik)	mie mi	ciebie ci	panu panowi	pani	ônymu/niymu/(jy)mu	ônymu/niymu/(jy)mu	ônyj nij jij	nōm	wōm	panōm	państwie	paniōm	ônym/(n)im	ônym/(n)im
Accusative (biernik)	mie	ciebie/ciã/cie	pana	pani	ônego/niego/(je)go	ônego/niego/(je)go	jōm niã	nŏs	wŏs	panōw	państwo	panie	ônym/nim	ônym/nim
Locative (miyjscownik)	mie	ciebie	panie	pani	ônym/nim	ônym/nim	ônyj/nij	nŏs	wŏs	panach	państwie	paniach	ônych/nich	ônych/nich
Instrumental (nŏrzyndnik)	mnōm	tobōm	panym	paniōm	ônym/nim	ônym/nim	niōm	nami	wami	panami/panōma	państwym	paniami/paniōma	ônymi nimi	ônymi nimi

There may be a form beginning with n-, used after prepositions. Short clitic forms (i.e. mu) might be used in unstressed positions.

The reflexive pronoun for all persons and numbers is siebie, sie, siã.

Case
Case	reflexive siebie/sie/siã.
Nominative/vocative (mianownik/wołŏcz)	—
Genitive (dopołniŏcz)	siebie / sie / siã
Dative (cylownik)	sobie
Accusative (biernik)	siebie / sie / siã
Locative (miyjscownik)	sobie
Instrumental (nŏrzyndnik)	sobōm

The possessive adjectives (also used as possessive pronouns) derived from the personal pronouns are mōj, twōj, jego (m., n.)/[jij (f.); nasz, wasz, ich. There is also a reflexive possessive swōj. The polite second-person pronouns have possessives identical to the genitives of the corresponding nouns.

The demonstrative pronoun, also used as a demonstrative adjective, is tyn (feminine ta, neuter to, masculine personal plural ci, other plural te). The distal demonstrative pronoun is tamtyn.

Interrogative pronouns are fto ("who") and co ("what"); these also provide the pronouns ftoś/coś ("someone/something"), nikt/nic ("no one/nothing").

The usual relative pronouns are kery, chtory, and ftory (which, which one; that) (declined like an adjective).

The pronoun and adjective wszystek means "all". It is used most commonly in the plural wszyjscy ("everyone"), and in the neuter singular (wszyjsko) to mean "everything". The pronoun and adjective każdy means "each, every", while żŏdyn means "no, none".

== Numbers and quantifiers ==
Silesian has a complex system of numerals and related quantifiers, with special rules for their inflection, for the case of the governed noun, and for verb agreement with the resulting noun phrase.

The base numbers are as follows:

1. Zero – nul/nula or zero
2. One – jedyn
3. Two – dwa
4. Three – trzi
5. Four – sztyry
6. Five – piyńć
7. Six – szejś/sześ
8. Seven – siedym
9. Eight – ôziym
10. Nine – dziewiyńć
11. Ten – dziesiyńć
12. Eleven – jedynŏście
13. Twelve – dwanŏście
14. Thirteen – trzinŏście
15. Fourteen – sztyrnŏście
16. Fifteen – piytnŏście
17. Sixteen – szesnŏście
18. Seventeen – siedymnŏście
19. Eighteen – ôziymnŏście
20. Nineteen – dziewiytnŏście
21. Twenty – dwadzieścia
22. Thirty – trzidzieści
23. Forty – sztyrdzieści
24. Fifty – piyńćdziesiōnt
25. Sixty – sześdziesiōnt/szejśdziesiōnt
26. Seventy – siedymdziesiōnt
27. Eighty – ôziymdziesiōnt
28. Ninety – dziewiyńćdziesiōnt
29. One hundred – sto
30. Two hundred – dwiesta
31. Three hundred – trzista
32. Four hundred – sztyrysta
33. Five hundred – piyńćset
34. Six hundred – sześset/szejśset
35. Seven hundred – siedymset
36. Eight hundred – ôziymset
37. Nine hundred – dziewiyńćset
38. One thousand – tysiōnc or tauzyn, which is treated as a noun (as thousand is dwa tysiōnce/tauzyny, literally "two thousands").
39. Million – milijōn, also a noun.
40. Billion (short scale), milliard (long scale) – milijard
41. Trillion (short scale), billion (long scale) – bilijōn
42. Quadrillion (short scale), billiard (long scale) – bilijard

Compound numbers are constructed similarly as in English (for example, 91,234 is dziewiyńćdziesiōnt jedyn tysiyncy/tauzynōw dwiesta trzidzieści sztyry). The numeral jedyn (1) behaves as an ordinary adjective, and no special rules apply. It can even be used in the plural, for example to mean "some" (and not others), or to mean "one" with pluralia tantum, e.g. jedne dźwiyrze "one door" (dźwiyrze has no singular). After the numerals dwa, trzi, sztyry (2, 3, 4), and compound numbers ending with them (22, 23, 24, etc. but not 12, 13, or 14, which take -nŏście as a suffix and are thus not compound numbers in the first place), the noun is plural and takes the same case as the numeral, and the resulting noun phrase is plural (e.g. 4 koty stały, "4 cats stood"). With other numbers (5, 6, etc., 20, 21, 25, etc.), if the numeral is nominative or accusative, the noun takes the genitive plural form, and the resulting noun phrase is neuter singular (e.g. 5 kotōw stało, "5 cats stood"). With the masculine personal plural forms of numbers (as given in the morphology article section), the rule given above – that if the numeral is nominative or accusative, the noun is genitive plural and the resulting phrase is neuter singular – applies to all numbers other than 1 (as in trzech chopōw prziszło, "three men came"). If the numeral is in the genitive, dative, instrumental or locative, the noun takes the same case as the numeral (except sometimes in the case of numbers that end with the nouns for 1000 and higher quantities, which often take a genitive noun regardless since they are treated as normal nouns).

Certain quantifiers behave similarly to numerals. These include kilka ("several"), ("a few") and wiele ("much, many"), which behave like numbers above 5 in terms of the noun cases and verb forms taken.

Quantifiers that always take the genitive of nouns include moc or siyła ("a lot"), dużo ("much, many"), mało ("few, little"), wiyncyj ("more"), mynij ("less") (also nojwiyncyj/nojmynij "most/least"), trochã ("a bit").

The words ôba and ôbadwa (meaning "both"), and their derived forms behave like dwa.

== Verbs ==
Silesian verbs have the grammatical category of aspect. Each verb is either imperfective, meaning that it denotes continuous or habitual events, or perfective, meaning that it denotes single completed events (in particular, perfective verbs have no present tense). Verbs often occur in imperfective and perfective pairs – for example, czytać and przeczytać both mean "to read", but the first has imperfective aspect, the second perfective.

Ôn czytoł ksiōnżkã. → "He was reading a book."
Ôn przeczytoł ksiōnżkã. → "He read a book."

Imperfective verbs have three tenses: present, past and future, the last being a compound tense (except in the case of być "to be"). Perfective verbs have a past tense and a simple future tense, the latter formed on the same pattern as the present tense of imperfective verbs. Both types also have imperative and conditional forms. The dictionary form of a verb is the infinitive, which usually ends with -ć and occasionally with -c, -ś, or -ź.

The present tense of imperfective verbs (and future tense of perfective verbs) has six forms, for the three persons and two numbers. There are eight main conjugation patterns.

=== Conjugation I ===
Conjugation I
		Singular			Plural	
	Person	Masculine	Feminine	Neuter	Virile	Nonvirile
infinitive		-ać				
present tense	1st	-ōm			-ōmy	
present tense	2nd	-ŏsz			-ŏcie	
present tense	3rd	-ŏ			-ajōm	

=== Conjugation II ===
Conjugation II
		Singular			Plural	
	Person	Masculine	Feminine	Neuter	Virile	Nonvirile
infinitive		-ać				
present tense	1st	-ã			-ymy	
present tense	2nd	-esz			-ecie	
present tense	3rd	-e			-ōm	

=== Conjugation III ===
Conjugation III
		Singular			Plural	
	Person	Masculine	Feminine	Neuter	Virile	Nonvirile
infinitive		-eć				
present tense	1st	-ã			-ymy	
present tense	2nd	-isz/-ysz			-icie/-ycie	
present tense	3rd	-i/-y			-ōm	

=== Conjugation IV ===
Conjugation IV
		Singular			Plural	
	Person	Masculine	Feminine	Neuter	Virile	Nonvirile
infinitive		-eć				
present tense	1st	-ejã			-ejymy	
present tense	2nd	-ejesz			-ejecie	
present tense	3rd	-eje			-ejōm	

=== Conjugation V ===
Conjugation V
		Singular			Plural	
	Person	Masculine	Feminine	Neuter	Virile	Nonvirile
infinitive		-eć				
present tense	1st	-ã			-ymy	
present tense	2nd	-isz/-ysz			-icie/-ycie	
present tense	3rd	-i/-y			-ōm	

=== Conjugation VI ===
Conjugation VI
		Singular			Plural	
	Person	Masculine	Feminine	Neuter	Virile	Nonvirile
infinitive		-ować				
present tense	1st	-ujã			-ujymy	
present tense	2nd	-ujesz			-ujecie	
present tense	3rd	-uje			-ujōm	

=== Conjugation VII ===
Conjugation VII
		Singular			Plural	
	Person	Masculine	Feminine	Neuter	Virile	Nonvirile
infinitive		-nōnć/-nyć				
present tense	1st	-ã			-nymy	
present tense	2nd	-niesz			-niecie	
present tense	3rd	-nie			-nōm	

=== Conjugation VIII ===
Conjugation VIII
		Singular			Plural	
	Person	Masculine	Feminine	Neuter	Virile	Nonvirile
infinitive		-ź/-ś/-c/-ć				
present tense	1st	-ã			-ymy	
present tense	2nd	-esz			-ecie	
present tense	3rd	-e			-ōm	

=== Być (to be) ===
być conjugation (irregular imperfective)
		Singular			Plural	
	Person	Masculine	Feminine	Neuter	Virile	Nonvirile
Infinitive		być				
present tense	1st	je żech			my sōm/mychmy sōm	
present tense	2nd	je żeś			sōm żeście	
present tense	3rd	je			sōm	
past tense	1st	bōł żech/żech bōł	była żech/byłach/żech była	było żech/żech było	byli my/my byli	były my/my były
past tense	2nd	bōł żeś/żeś bōł	była żeś/byłaś/żeś była	było żeś/żeś było	byliście/żeście byli	byłyście/żeście były
past tense	3rd	bōł	była	było	byli	były
future tense	1st	bydã			bydymy	
future tense	2nd	bydziesz			bydziecie	
future tense	3rd	bydzie			bydōm	
conditional	1st	bych bōł	bych była	bych było	by my byli/bychmy byli	byście byli
conditional	2nd	byś bōł	byś była	byś było	byście byli	byście były
conditional	3rd	by bōł	by była	by było	by byli	by były
imperative	1st	niych bydã			bydźmy	
imperative	2nd	bydź			bydźcie	
imperative	3rd	niych bydzie			niych bydōm	
active adjectival participle		bydōncy	bydōncŏ	bydōnce	bydōncy	bydōnce
contemporary adverbial participle		bydōnc				
verbal noun		bycie				

=== Past tense ===
The past tense agrees with the subject in gender as well as person and number. The basic past stem is in -ł; to this are added endings for gender and number, and then personal endings are further added for the first and second person forms.

==== Simple past tense ====
Past tense
		Singular			Plural	
	Person	Masculine	Feminine	Neuter	Virile	Nonvirile
Past tense	1st	-łch/-łech/-ł żech	-łach/-ła żech	-łoch/-ło żech	-limy/-lichmy	-łymy/-łychmy
Past tense	2nd	-łś/-łeś/-ł żeś	-łaś/-ła żeś	-łoś/-ło żeś	-liście/-li żeście	-łyście/-ły żeście
Past tense	3rd	-ł	-ła	-ło	-li	-ły

==== Pluperfect ====
The largely archaic or stylized pluperfect tense is formed analytically:

1. In the first person masculine singular, with bōłch, bōłech, or bōł żech and the third person masculine past form.
2. In the first person feminine singular, with byłach or była żech and the third person feminine past form.
3. In the first person neuter singular, with byłoch or było żech and the third person feminine past form.
4. In the first person virile plural, with byli my orbylichmy and the third person virile plural past form.
5. In the first person non-virile plural, with były my or byłychmy and the third person virile plural past form.
6. In the second person masculine singular, with bōłś, bōłeś, or bōł żeś and the third person masculine past form.
7. In the second person feminine singular, with byłaś or była żeś and the third person feminine past form.
8. In the second person neuter singular, with byłoś or było żeś and the third person feminine past form.
9. In the second person virile plural, with byliście or byli żeście and the third person virile plural past form.
10. In the second person non-virile plural, with byłyście or były żeście and the third person virile plural past form.
11. In the third person masculine singular, with bōł and the third person masculine past form.
12. In the second person feminine singular, with była and the third person feminine past form.
13. In the second person neuter singular, with było and the third person feminine past form.
14. In the second person virile plural, with byliście and the third person virile plural past form.
15. In the second person non-virile plural, with byłyście and the third person virile plural past form.

=== Future tense ===
The imperfective future tense is formed analytically using a future form of być and either the infinite or the appropriate third person past form.

czytać → bydã czytać/bydã czytoł

The perfective future is formed using a personal non-past form of a perfective form.

przeczytać → przeczytōm

=== Conditional mood ===
The conditional is formed analytically or by attaching a declined form of the clitic by and the third person past tense.

1. In the first person singular, with bych and the appropriate third person past form.
2. In the first person virile plural, with by my or bychmy and the third person virile plural past form.
3. In the first person non-virile plural, with by my or bychmy and the third person virile plural past form.
4. In the first person singular, with byś and the appropriate third person past form.
5. In the second person virile plural, with byście and the third person virile plural past form.
6. In the second person non-virile plural, with byście and the third person virile plural past form.
7. In the third person, with by and the appropriate third person past form.

=== Imperative ===
The imperative is formed in various ways depending on the conjugation pattern. Sometimes only the stem is present with raising, as in robić → rōb, sometimes the suffixes -ej/-ij are added. Further suffixes -my and -cie are available for the first person plural and second person plural forms. To make third-person imperative sentences (including with the polite second-person pronouns pōn etc.) the particle niych is used at the start of the sentence (or at least before the verb), with the verb in the future tense (if być or perfective) or present tense (otherwise). There is a tendency to prefer imperfective verbs in imperative sentences for politeness; negative imperatives quite rarely use perfectives.

=== Participles ===
- present adverbial participle (imperfective verbs only) are formed with -ōnc such as śpiywajōnc (meaning "(when) singing", "by singing", etc.)
- present adjectival participle (imperfective verbs only), formed from the present adverbial participle by adding adjectival endings with -ōncy as śpiywajōncy etc., meaning "singing" (as an attributive adjective), although such participles can be used to form extended adjectival phrases, which (usually unlike in English) can precede the noun.
- passive participle (all transitive verbs), in -ny or -ty (conjugated as an adjective). This often corresponds to the English past participle, both in fully adjectival use and in passive voice.

=== Verbal noun ===
The verbal noun is formed by adding either -ni(e) or -ci(e). It is a regular derivation of verbs.

== Prepositions ==
Silesian uses prepositions, which form phrases by preceding a noun or noun phrase. Different prepositions take different cases (all cases are possible except nominative and vocative); some prepositions can take different cases depending on meaning.

The prepositions z and w are pronounced together with the following word, obeying the usual rules for consonant cluster voicing (so z tobōm "with you" is pronounced stobōm). Before some consonant clusters, particularly clusters beginning with a sibilant (in the case of z) or with f/w (in the case of w), the prepositions take the form zy and wy. These forms are also used before the first-person singular pronouns in mn-; several other prepositions also have longer forms before these pronouns, and these phrases are pronounced as single words, with the stress on the penultimate syllable (the -y). The prepositions po and do have the variations pō and dō when before nasal consonants.

Common prepositions include:

- na, with the locative with basic meaning "on", and with the accusative with basic meaning "onto" (also metaphorical meanings)
- w, with the locative with basic meaning "in"
- z, with the instrumental comitative meaning "with" (in accompaniment of); with the genitive meaning "from, out of"
- do/ôd, with genitive, meaning "to, into/from"
- dlŏ, with genitive, meaning "for"
- ô, with locative meaning "about", also with the accusative in some constructions
- przed/za/nad/pod with instrumental meaning "before, in front of/behind/over/under", also with the accusative in some meanings (and genitive in the case of za); there are also compound prepositions sprzed/zza/znad/spod ("from in front of" etc.) taking the genitive
- przez/bez with the accusative, meaning "through" etc.
- przeciwko with dative, meaning "against"
- po, with locative meaning "after", also with the accusative in some meanings
- przi, with locative, meaning "near" etc.
- bez, with genitive, meaning "without"

== Conjunctions ==
Common Silesian conjunctions include:

- i meaning "and"
- lub and a(l)bo meaning "or"
- ale meaning "but"
- że meaning "that"
- jeśli/eźli/ejźli/jeli/eli/jeźli/jesi meaning "if" (for real conditionals) or gdyby and keby (where by is the conditional particle)
- czy meaning "whether" (also an interrogative particle)
- kedy or gdy meaning "when"
- wiync and beztōż/bezto meaning "so" and "therefore"
- bo meaning "because"
- choć/chociŏż meaning "although"
- aby/żeby meaning "in order to/that" (can be followed by an infinitive phrase, or by a sentence in the past tense; in the latter case, the by of the conjunction is in fact the conditional particle and takes personal endings as appropriate)

== Bibliography ==
- Jaroszewicz, Henryk (2022). Zasady pisowni języka śląskiego (in Silesian). pp. 173–190.
- Henryk Jaroszewicz (19 March 2021). "Formy czasownikowe języka śląskiego. Próba klasyfikacji". Wachtyrz.eu (in Silesian). Kotórz Mały, Poland: Silesia Progress.
- Henryk Jaroszewicz (11 January 2021). "System koniugacji języka śląskiego. Próba klasyfikacji". Wachtyrz.eu (in Silesian). Kotórz Mały, Poland: Silesia Progress.
- Henryk Jaroszewicz (27 February 2021). "System deklinacji rzeczowników języka śląskiego. Próba klasyfikacji". Wachtyrz.eu (in Silesian). Kotórz Mały, Poland: Silesia Progress.
