= Silesian orthography =

System of writing the Silesian language

Silesian orthography consists of many systems for writing the Silesian language. The current de facto standard is the Ślabikŏrzowy szrajbōnek or ślabikŏrz for short, largely but not entirely displacing the first Silesian alphabet, the Steuerowy szrajbůnek ("Steuer's alphabet). These systems use variants of the Silesian alphabet, which derives from the Latin alphabet, but includes some additional letters with diacritics. The orthography is mostly phonetic, or rather phonemic—the written letters (or combinations of them) correspond in a consistent manner to the phonemes of spoken Silesian.

== Steuer's alphabet ==
The first major and widely adopted writing system for Silesians was created by doctor Feliks Steuer in the 1930s. It consists of 30 graphemes and 8 digraphs, based partially on Polish orthography and partially on Czech orthography.

Steuer's alphabet
Majuscule forms (also called uppercase or capital letters)
A	B	C	Ć	D	E	F	G	H	I	J	K	L	Ł	M	N	Ń	O	P	R	S	Ś	T	U	Ů	W	Y	Z	Ź	Ż
Minuscule forms (also called lowercase or small letters)
a	b	c	ć	d	e	f	g	h	i	j	k	l	ł	m	n	ń	o	p	r	s	ś	t	u	ů	w	y	z	ź	ż
Phonetic realizations in IPA
a	b	t͡s	t͡ɕ	d	ɛ	f	ɡ	x	i	j	k	l	w	m	n	ɲ	ɔ	p	r	s	ɕ	t	u	o	v	ɪ	z	ʑ	ʐ

Digraphs
Majuscule forms (also called uppercase or capital letters)
AU	CH	CZ	DZ	DŹ	DŻ	RZ	SZ	OU
Minuscule forms (also called lowercase or small letters)
au	ch	cz	dz	dź	dż	rz	sz	ou
Phonetic realizations in IPA
au	x	t͡ʂ	d͡z	d͡ʑ	d͡ʐ	ʐ~ʂ	ʂ	ou

Steuer's alphabet did not account for voicing assimilation, so any voiced letter such as <d> might also be pronounced unvoiced when before an unvoiced consonant or at the end of a word. Palatalized consonants are written with <j>.

== Ślabikŏrz ==
Ślabikŏrzowy szrajbōnek was adopted by Pro Loquela Silesiana, a group using the Cieszyn dialect of Silesian, the closest one to Polish. in 2010 and has since become the main writing systems for Silesian, attempting to account for dialectal variation. It uses the Latin alphabet with additional digraphs and diacritics.

Ślabikŏrzowy szrajbōnek
Majuscule forms (also called uppercase or capital letters)
A	Ã	B	C	Ć	D	E	F	G	H	I	J	K	L	Ł	M	N	Ń	O	Ŏ	Ō	Ô	Õ	P	R	S	Ś	T	U	W	Y	Z	Ź	Ż
Minuscule forms (also called lowercase or small letters)
a	ã	b	c	ć	d	e	f	g	h	i	j	k	l	ł	m	n	ń	o	ŏ	ō	ô	õ	p	r	s	ś	t	u	w	y	z	ź	ż
Phonetic realizations in IPA
a	ã	b	t͡s	t͡ɕ	d	ɛ	f	g	x	i	j	k	l	w	m	n	ɲ	ɔ	ɔu~ɔ	o	wɔ	ɔ̃	p	r	s	ɕ	t	u	v	ɪ	z	ʑ	ʐ

Digraphs
Majuscule forms (also called uppercase or capital letters)
AU	CH	CZ	DZ	DŹ	DŻ	EU	RZ	SZ
Minuscule forms (also called lowercase or small letters)
au	ch	cz	dz	dź	dż	eu	rz	sz
Phonetic realizations in IPA
au	x	t͡ʂ	d͡z	d͡ʑ	d͡ʐ	eu	ʐ~ʂ	ʂ

=== Spelling rules ===
Vowels are largely pronounced as they are written. <Ŏŏ> can vary from /ɔu~ɔ/, where /ɔu/ is largely pronounced in Opole and /ɔ/ everywhere else, making it a homograph of <o>. Ôô is used largely at the beginning of words, sometimes word-medially with affixed words (wy-ôbrazić and compounds (boli-ôczko). <Ãã>, <Õõ>, and <Ŏŏ> are used more in formal literature, as many dialects do not retain their pronunciations, and replace <Ãã> with <Aa>, and <Õõ> and <Ŏŏ> with <Oo>.

Consonants are regularly voiced or devoiced depending on the end consonant in a cluster.

jabko is pronounced /'japko/
także is pronounced /'taɡʐɛ/

Two notable exceptions are the groups <w> and <rz>, which do not determine the voicing of the cluster.

wpadnōńć is pronounced /'fpadnoɲt͡ɕ/
przichodzić is pronounced /pʂi'xɔd͡ʑit͡ɕ/

Consonants are also devoiced at the end of a word, known as final-obstruent devoicing.

miydź is pronounced /mjɪt͡ɕ/

Rarely, ⟨rz⟩ is not a digraph and represents two separate sounds:

- in various forms of the verb -marznōńć (i.e. zamarznōńć) – "to freeze"
- in borrowings, for example erzac (from German Ersatz)

==== Palatal and palatalized consonants ====
The spelling rule for the alveolo-palatal sounds /ɕ ʑ t͡ɕ d͡ʑ ɲ/ is as follows: before the vowel ⟨i⟩ the plain letters ⟨s z c dz n⟩ are used; before other vowels the combinations ⟨si zi ci dzi ni⟩ are used; when not followed by a vowel the diacritic forms ⟨ś ź ć dź ń⟩ are used. This is different from Steuer's alphabet, where soft consonants are always written with the acute accent. For example, the ⟨s⟩ in siwy ("grey-haired"), the ⟨si⟩ in siarka ("sulphur") and the ⟨ś⟩ in świynty ("holy") all represent the sound /ɕ/.

Sound	Word-finally or before a consonant	Before a vowel other than ⟨i⟩	Before ⟨i⟩
/t͡ɕ/	ć	ci	c
/d͡ʑ/	dź	dzi	dz
/ɕ/	ś	si	s
/ʑ/	ź	zi	z
/ɲ/	ń	ni	n

==== Other points ====
The letter ⟨u⟩ represents /ł/ in the digraphs ⟨au⟩ and ⟨eu⟩ in loanwords, for example autor, Europa; but not in native words, like nauka, pronounced na'(w)uka.

=== Writing words with or without a space ===
It is prescribed to write prepositional, adverbal, numeral, particle, conjunctional, and pronominal phrases with a space.

bele co, not beleco
w porzōndku, not wporzōndku

Some fully lexicalized prepositional phrases serving as adverbs or conjunctions are prescribed to be written together.

bezto, "that is why; therefor"
doprŏwdy, "really"

=== Punctuation ===
It is prescribed to use the same punctuation rules as in Polish orthography, namely:

1. Periods <.> are to be used
  1. To end sentences in the indicative mood
  2. After ordinal numbers written in Arabic numerals, e.g. 2. pies "the second dog"
  3. In initialisms
  4. In dates given in Arabic numerals
  5. After the hour when a time is written in Arabic numerals, e.g. 12.03
2. Commas <,> are to be used generally to separate coordinating and subordinating clauses except:
  1. Before the conjunctions a, i, abo
  2. ani when the subject of all verbs in the clause are the same
3. Colons <:> are to be used
  1. After the name of a quoted word before the quotation
  2. To specify or clarify a noun
4. Ellipses <...> are to be used
  1. To show interruption or missing text
  2. To show a pause in speech, usually for emphasis
5. Question marks <?> are to be used to mark questions
6. Exclamation marks <!> are to be used show surprise

=== Capitalization ===
Capitalization is used at the beginning of a sentence or to mark a proper noun, such as place names or given names, among others.

== Bibliography ==
- Jaroszewicz, Henryk (2022). Zasady pisowni języka śląskiego (in Polish and Silesian). pp. 11–59.
