= Kargowa =

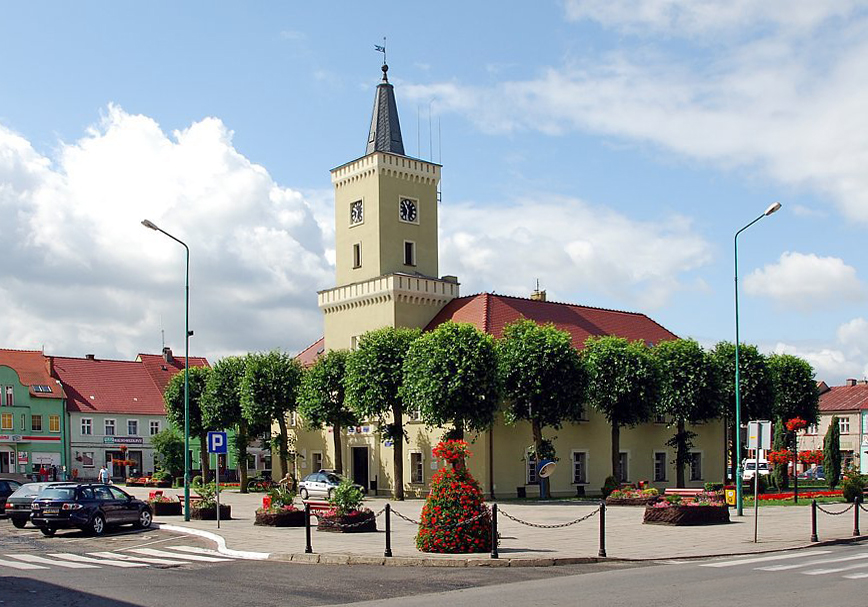
- Town hall

- Flag Coat of arms

- Location within Poland
- Coordinates: 52°4′N 15°52′E
- Country: Poland
- Voivodeship: Lubusz
- County: Zielona Góra
- Gmina: Kargowa
- First mentioned: 14th century
- Town rights: 1661

Area
  - Total: 4.55 km^{2} (1.76 sq mi)

Population (2019-06-30)
  - Total: 3,769
  - Density: 828/km^{2} (2,150/sq mi)
- Time zone: UTC+1 (CET)
  - Summer (DST): UTC+2 (CEST)
- Postal code: 66-120
- Area code: +48 68
- Vehicle registration: FZI
- Climate: Cfb
- Website: kargowa.pl

Kargowa [karˈɡɔva] (German: Unruhstadt) is a town in Zielona Góra County, Lubusz Voivodeship, in western Poland, with 3,769 inhabitants (2019).

Though located in the Lubusz Voivodeship, Kargowa is part of the Greater Poland historic region.

== History ==
Kargowa was first mentioned in writing in the 14th century. It was granted town rights by King John II Casimir Vasa in 1661. In the 18th century, the kings Augustus II the Strong and Augustus III of Poland often visited the town during their travels between Warsaw and Dresden. In the 18th century the town was the site of two battles. During the War of the Polish Succession, in 1735, a battle was fought between Poles and Saxons. During the Second Partition of Poland in 1793, Kargowa was one of the places of Polish resistance against Prussia and a defensive battle took place.

After the successful Polish Greater Poland uprising of 1806, Kargowa was regained by the Poles and became part of the short-lived Polish Duchy of Warsaw. In 1815 it was annexed by Prussia for the second time. After Poland regained independence, Kargowa was captured by Polish insurgents in 1919; however, the Treaty of Versailles granted the town to Germany.

During the final stages of World War II in 1945, a German-perpetrated death march of Jewish women from a just dissolved subcamp of the Gross-Rosen concentration camp in Sława passed through the town. The town finally returned to Poland after the defeat of Nazi Germany in World War II in 1945.

== Demographics ==
Historical population

Year	Pop.	±%
1810	1,805	—
1843	2,058	+14.0%
1871	1,959	−4.8%
1880	2,023	+3.3%
1890	1,724	−14.8%
1900	1,594	−7.5%

Year	Pop.	±%
1910	1,500	−5.9%
1925	1,469	−2.1%
1939	1,713	+16.6%
1950	1,796	+4.8%
1960	2,425	+35.0%
2010	3,658	+50.8%

== Notable people ==
- Karl von Hänisch, military general
- Maciej Kozłowski, actor
- Carl Gottfried Drange, one of Angela Merkel's maternal ancestors was a master miller here

== Twin towns – sister cities ==
See twin towns of Gmina Kargowa.

== Gallery ==
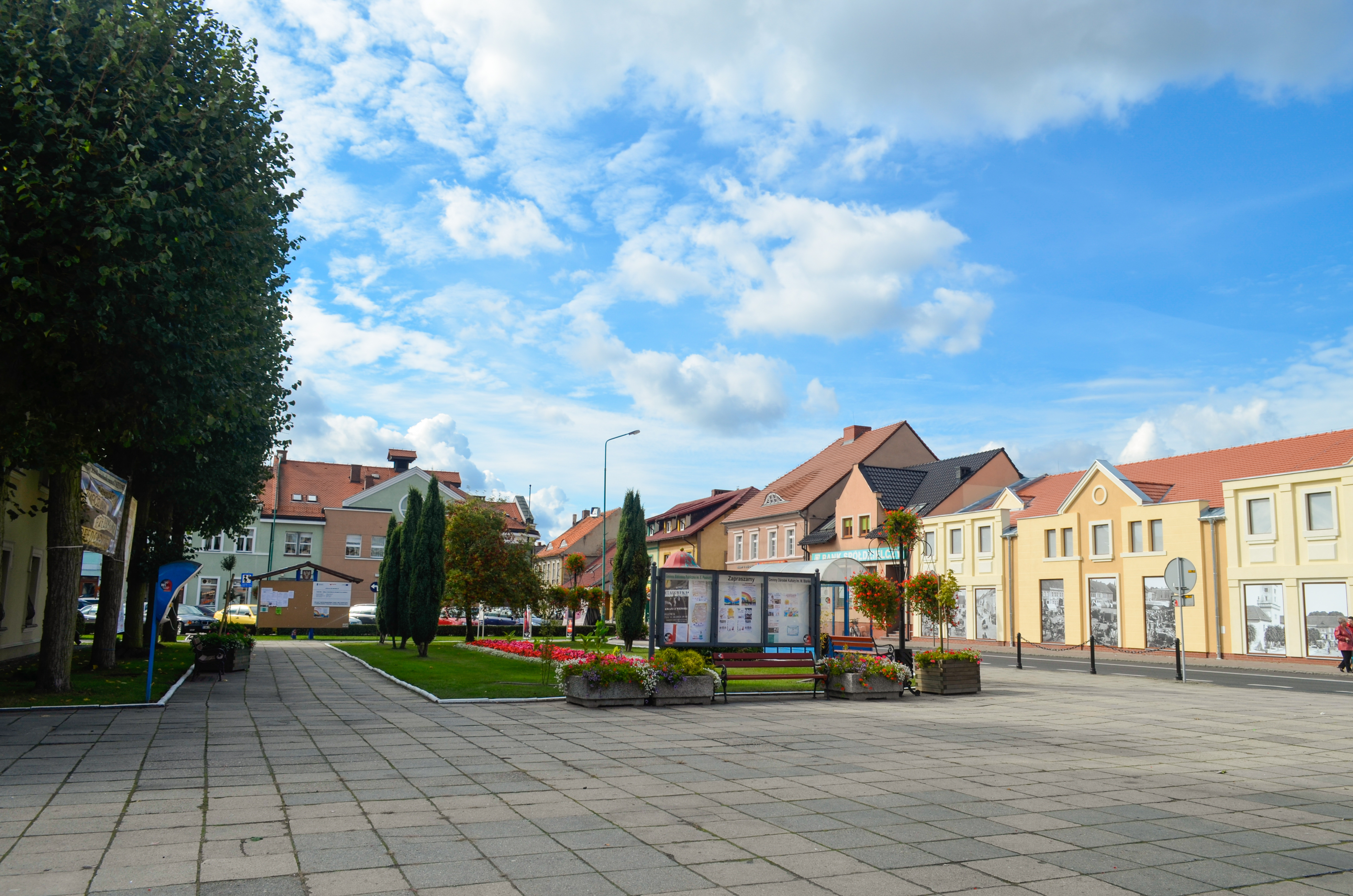
Town center

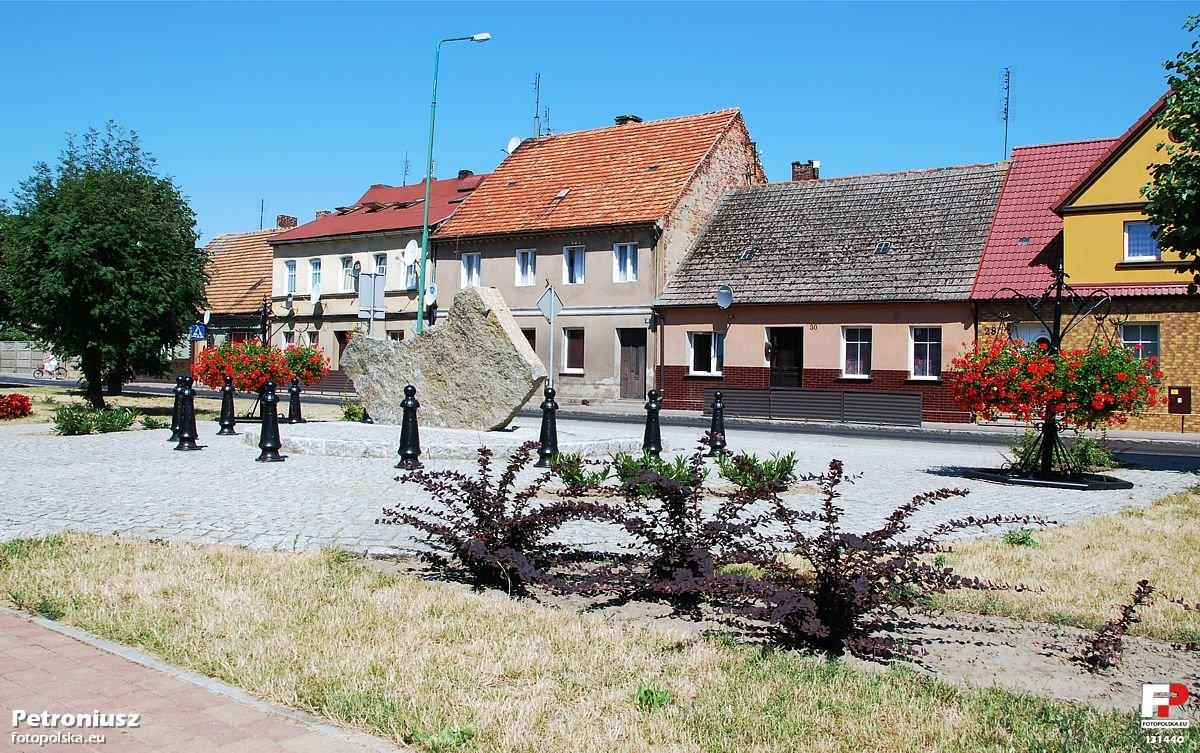
Monument to the Heroes of the Greater Poland uprising

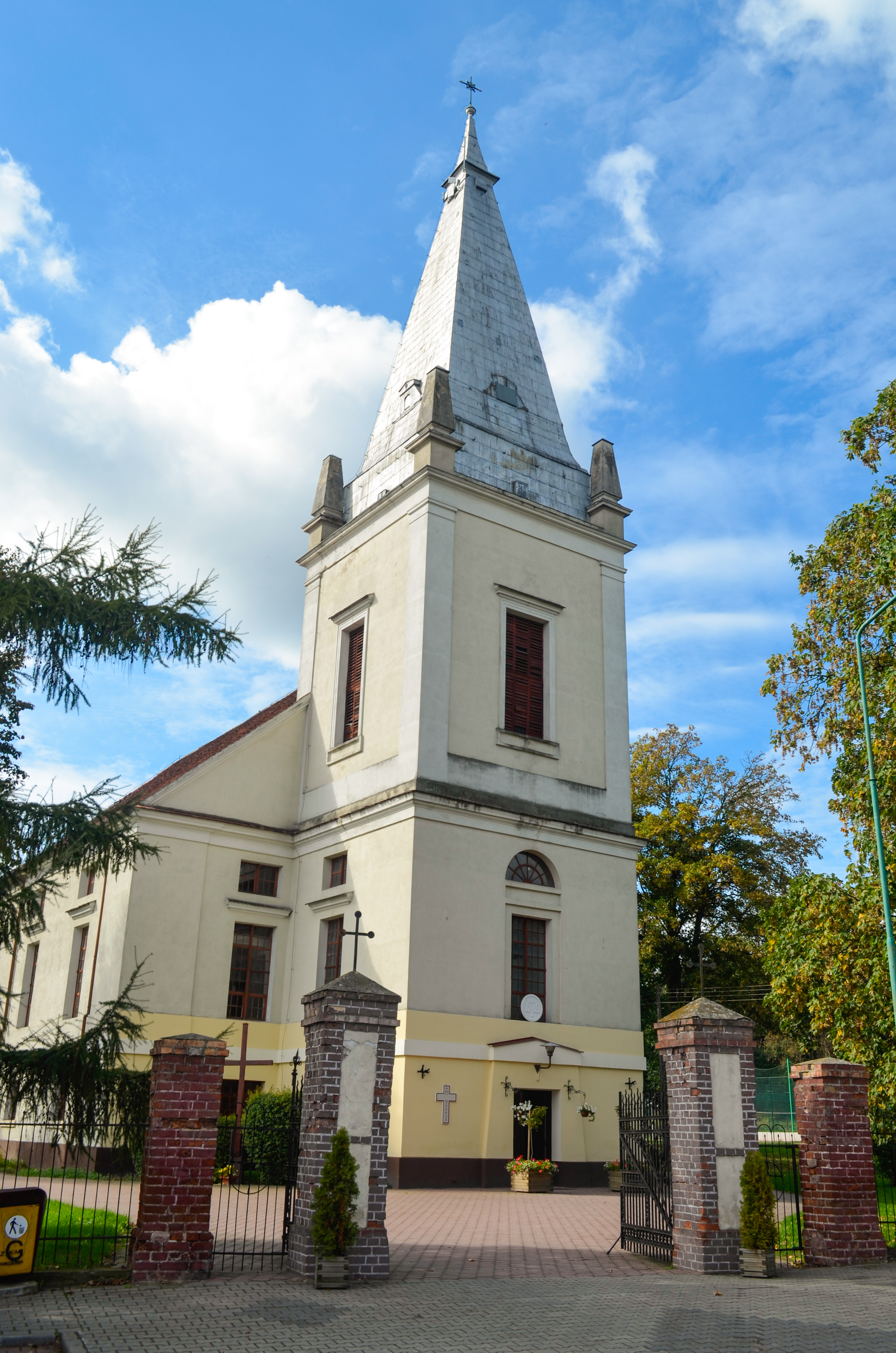
Maximilian Kolbe church

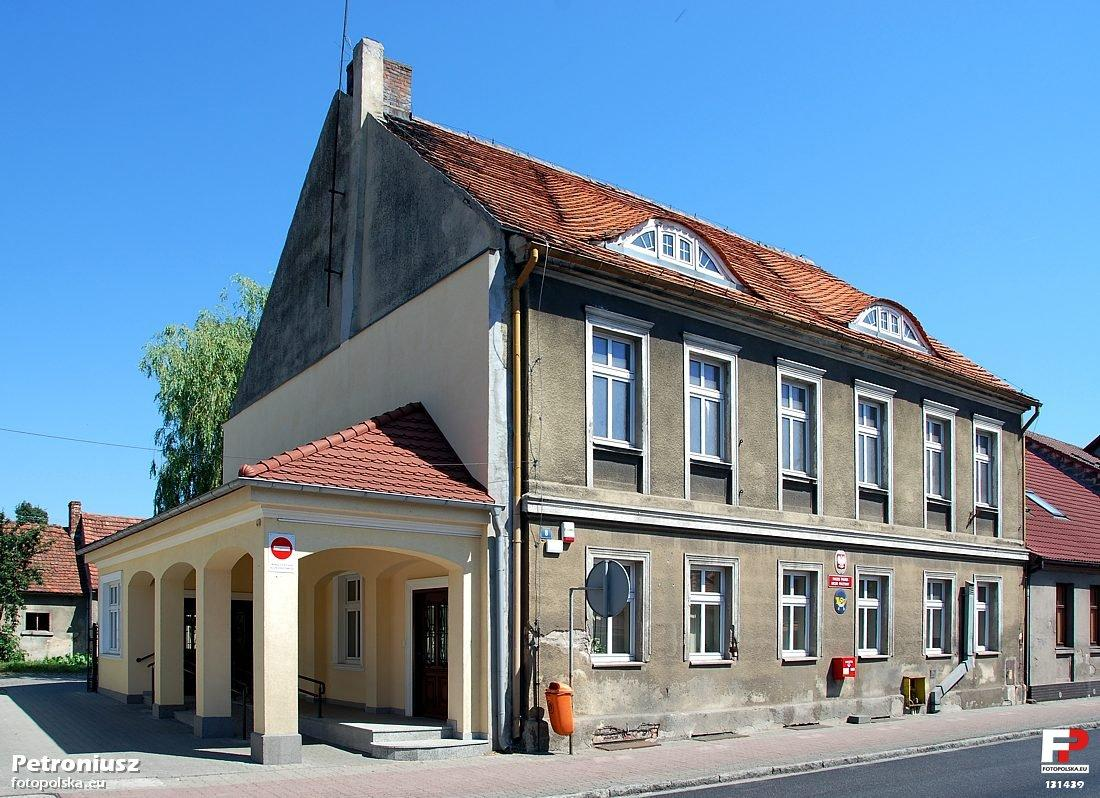
Post office
