= Napoleon Oak =

Coordinates: 51°58′20″N 15°44′12″E

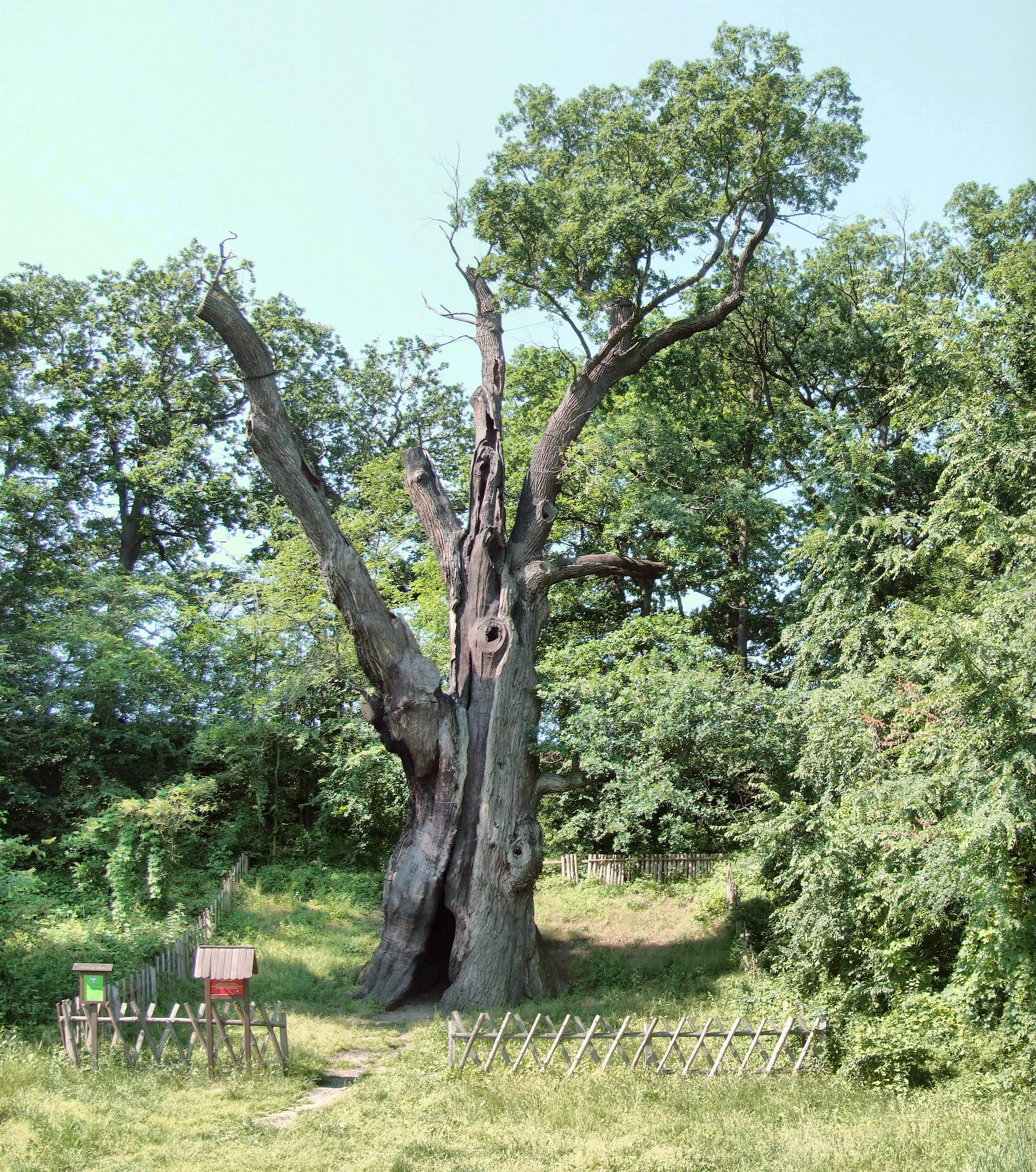
Napoleon Oak

The Napoleon Oak was formerly the largest oak in Poland and one of the largest in Europe. It was a monumental tree with single-stemmed, hollow trunk. Its girth was 1.3 meter and its height 10.425 meters, with a total height of 28 meters (in 2007) and a volume of about 130 m³. The age of the tree was estimated at 600–700 years. It was set on fire by vandals (at least the third time in history) and collapsed in May 2010.

Name of the tree is connected to Napoleon Bonaparte, who allegedly stopped by this oak in 1812, when his army went to Russia.

This oak grew in Zabór, Lubusz Voivodeship.

== See also ==
- Napoleon Oak (Lausanne)
- Chrobry Oak
- Bartek (oak)
- Bażyński Oak
- Sobieski Oak
