= Lime in Cielętniki =

Largest tree in Poland

Coordinates: 50°53′27″N 19°34′39″E

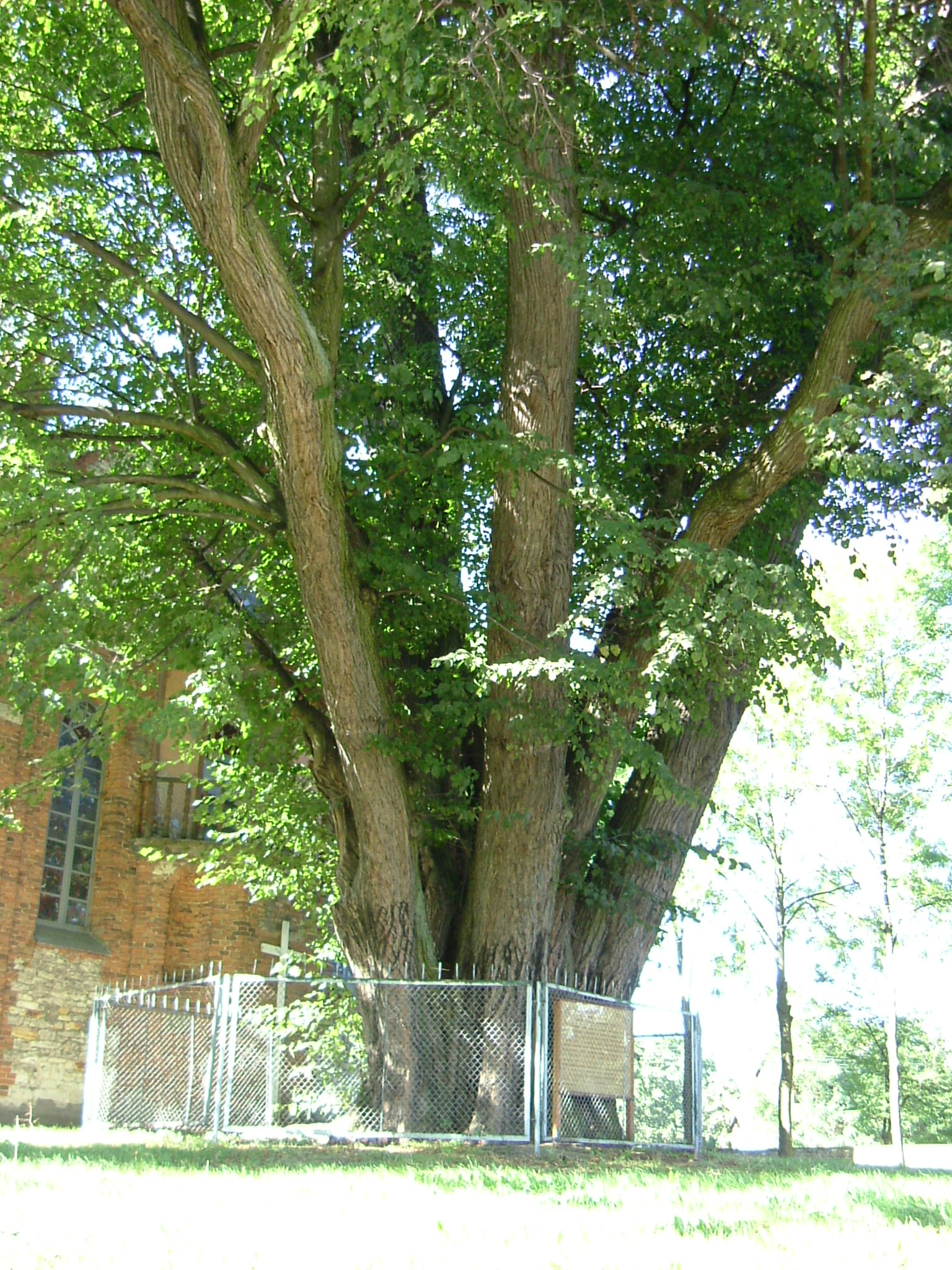
Lime in Cielętniki.

The Cielętniki Lime is a common lime tree located in Cielętniki, in southern Poland.

It is the largest tree in Poland by circumference. In 2014, the girth of the lime measured 10.84 metres (0.7 m at its narrowest) and its height was 29.5 metres. According to dendrochronological research, the tree is approximately 550 years old.

The lime tree has a massive, multi-stemmed trunk with a large crown spread. Its CBH (circumference at breast height) was recorded at 11.07 metres in 2014. According to local legend, the lime grew from 18 small trees planted many years ago by an unknown voivode. according to legend. The bark of the tree was traditionally believed to cure toothache, and the nearby church, dedicated to Saint Apollonia, the patron saint of stomatologists. The tree attracted pilgrims to the village, who bit the bark to heal their teeth.

Today, the tree is protected by a fence and is designated as a natural monument.

== See also ==
- Bartek (oak)
- Chrobry Oak
- Witcher (tree)
