= Bartków, Świętokrzyskie Voivodeship =

Bartków
- Village
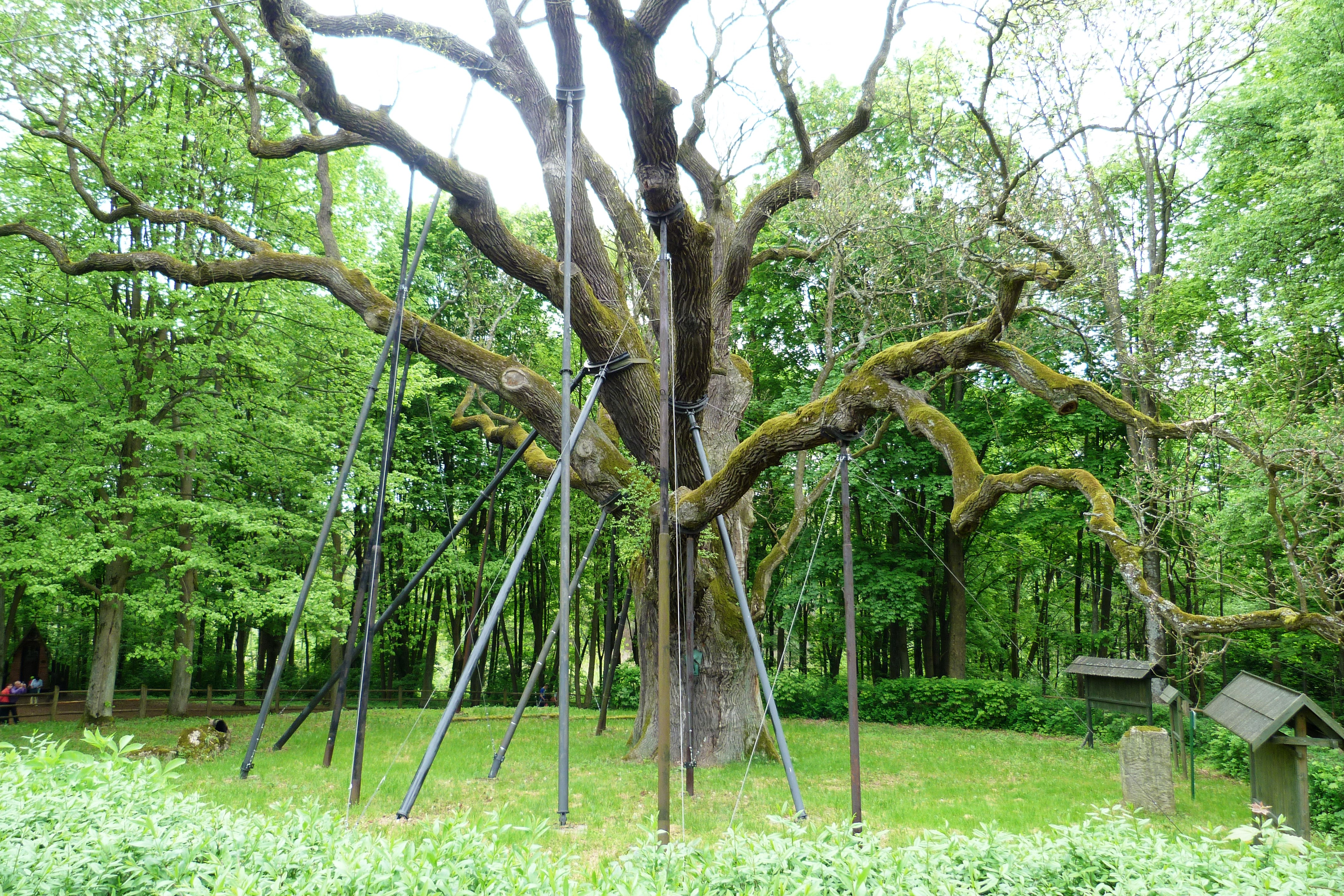
- The Bartek Oak

- Location within Poland
- Coordinates: 50°58′47″N 20°38′45″E
- Country: Poland
- Voivodeship: Świętokrzyskie
- County: Kielce
- Gmina: Zagnańsk
- Population: 572

Bartków [ˈbartkuf] is a village in the administrative district of Gmina Zagnańsk, within Kielce County, Świętokrzyskie Voivodeship, in south-central Poland. It lies approximately 2 km (1 mi) west of Zagnańsk and 11 km (7 mi) north of the regional capital Kielce.
