= Wiedźmin (tree) =

Species of plant

Coordinates: 51°57′50″N 14°45′58″E

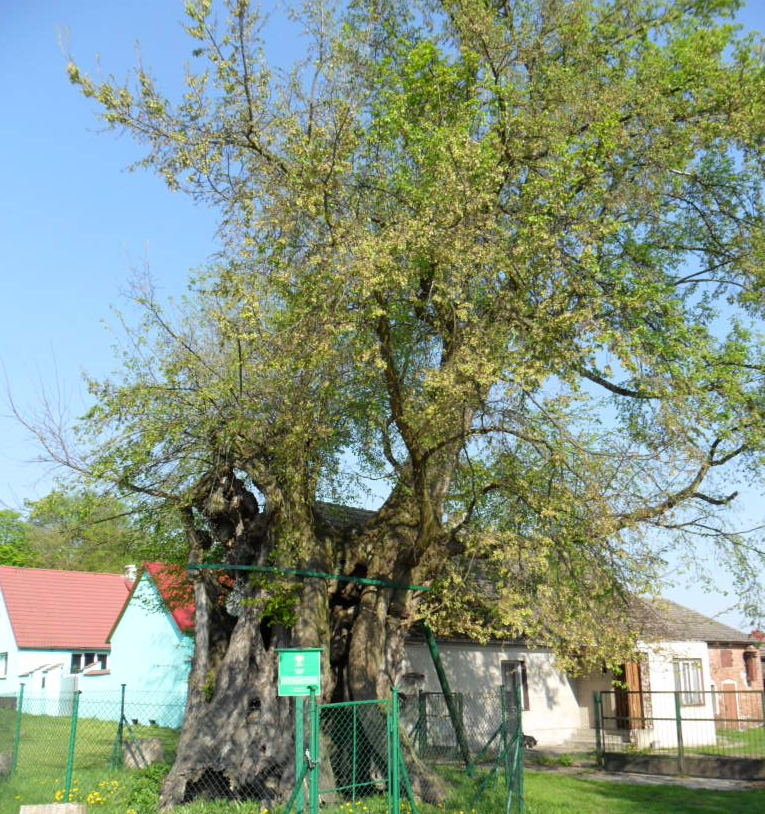
Elm "Wiedźmin", 2011

Wiedźmin (also known as Mieszko) is a European White Elm tree (Ulmus laevis), one of the largest elms in Europe. It is located in Komorów, Lubusz Voivodeship, Poland.

This elm has short, wide trunk with large hole near the base. Its circumference measured at the 1,3 m height (CBH) was 930 cm (in 2011).

The height of the tree was 19 m. Wiedźmin was significantly taller previously (about 35,5 m). Unfortunately, part of the crown collapsed in 2004, when harsh thunderstorm attacked those lands.

The age of the tree, according to the dendrochronological methods, is over 460 years (in 2016).

Wiedźmin is officially preserved since 1971, as a natural monument. A fence around the tree has been made to protect it.

The name of the tree, "wiedźmin" comes from Andrzej Sapkowski's book series The Witcher, and is a masculine form of "wiedźma" ("witch"). It was picked by a local popular poll.

The other name of the tree, "Mieszko", is still common among local foresters. It refers to Mieszko I, one of the first rulers of Poland.

== See also ==
- Bartek oak
- Bażyński Oak
- The Giant Plane
