= Jasiów =

- Village
- Location within Poland
- Coordinates: 50°59′42″N 20°38′32″E
- Country: Poland
- Voivodeship: Świętokrzyskie
- County: Kielce
- Gmina: Zagnańsk

Jasiów [ˈjaɕuf] is a village in the administrative district of Gmina Zagnańsk, within Kielce County, Świętokrzyskie Voivodeship, in south-central Poland. It lies approximately 3 km (2 mi) north-west of Zagnańsk and 13 km (8 mi) north of the regional capital Kielce.
