= Zabłocie, Świętokrzyskie Voivodeship =

Zabłocie
- Village
- Location within Poland
- Coordinates: 50°56′59″N 20°40′53″E
- Country: Poland
- Voivodeship: Świętokrzyskie
- County: Kielce
- Gmina: Zagnańsk
- Population: 380

Zabłocie [zaˈbwɔt͡ɕɛ] is a village in the administrative district of Gmina Zagnańsk, within Kielce County, Świętokrzyskie Voivodeship, in south-central Poland. It lies approximately 4 km (2 mi) south of Zagnańsk and 9 km (6 mi) north-east of the regional capital Kielce.
