= Tumlin-Węgle =

- Village
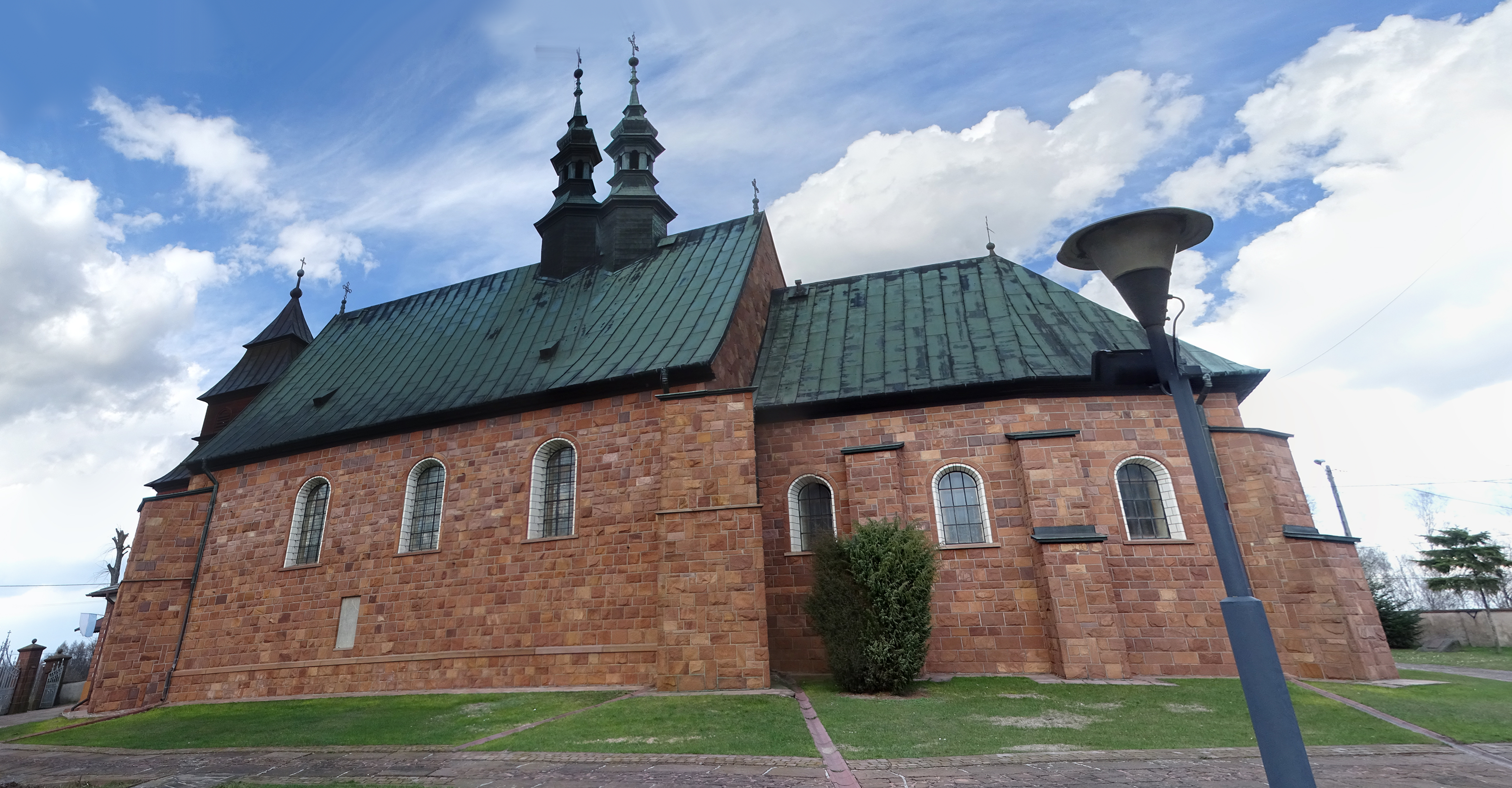
- Catholic church

- Location within Poland
- Coordinates: 50°57′54″N 20°35′37″E
- Country: Poland
- Voivodeship: Świętokrzyskie
- County: Kielce
- Gmina: Zagnańsk
- Population: 1,393

Tumlin-Węgle [ˈtumlin ˈvɛŋɡlɛ] is a village in the administrative district of Gmina Zagnańsk, within Kielce County, Świętokrzyskie Voivodeship, in south-central Poland. It lies approximately 6 km (4 mi) west of Zagnańsk and 10 km (6 mi) north of the regional capital Kielce.
