= Kaniów =

Kaniów may refer to:

- Polish name for Kaniv in Ukraine
- Kaniów, Świętokrzyskie Voivodeship (south-central Poland)
- Kaniów, Silesian Voivodeship (south Poland)
- Kaniów, Lubusz Voivodeship (west Poland)
- Kaniów, Opole Voivodeship (south-west Poland)
- Battle of Kaniów, during World War I
