= Samsonów =

- Village
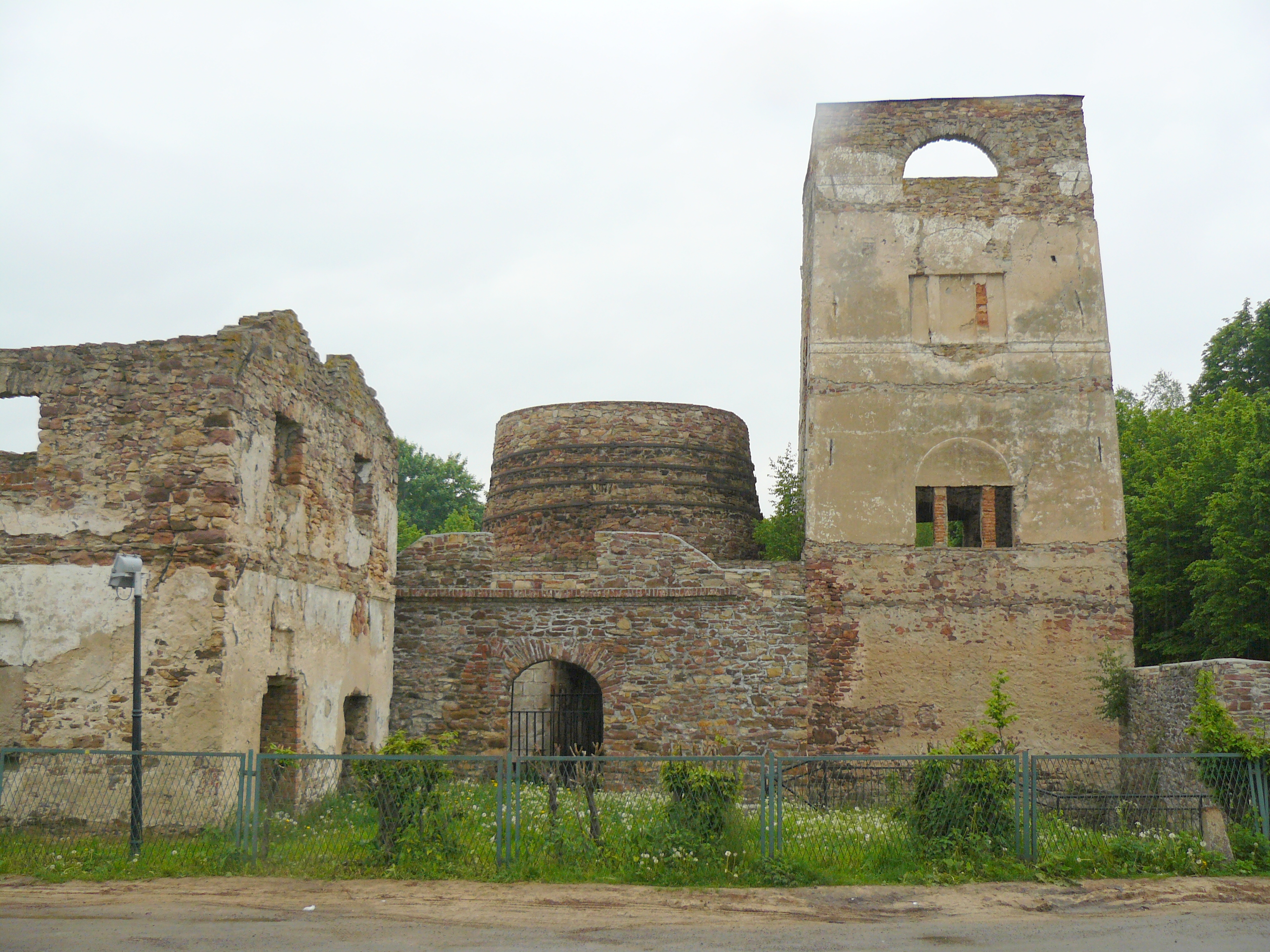
- Ruins of 19th century blast furnace

- Location within Poland
- Coordinates: 50°59′29″N 20°37′27″E
- Country: Poland
- Voivodeship: Świętokrzyskie
- County: Kielce
- Gmina: Zagnańsk
- Population: 1,125

Samsonów [samˈsɔnuf] is a village in the administrative district of Gmina Zagnańsk, within Kielce County, Świętokrzyskie Voivodeship, in south-central Poland. It lies approximately 4 km (2 mi) north-west of Zagnańsk and 12 km (7 mi) north of the regional capital Kielce.
