= Belno, Gmina Zagnańsk =

Belno
- Village
- Location within Poland
- Coordinates: 50°59′24″N 20°43′4″E
- Country: Poland
- Voivodeship: Świętokrzyskie
- County: Kielce
- Gmina: Zagnańsk
- Population: 659

Belno [ˈbɛlnɔ] is a village in the administrative district of Gmina Zagnańsk, within Kielce County, Świętokrzyskie Voivodeship, in south-central Poland. It lies approximately 4 km (2 mi) east of Zagnańsk and 14 km (9 mi) north-east of the regional capital Kielce.
