= Janaszów =

- Village
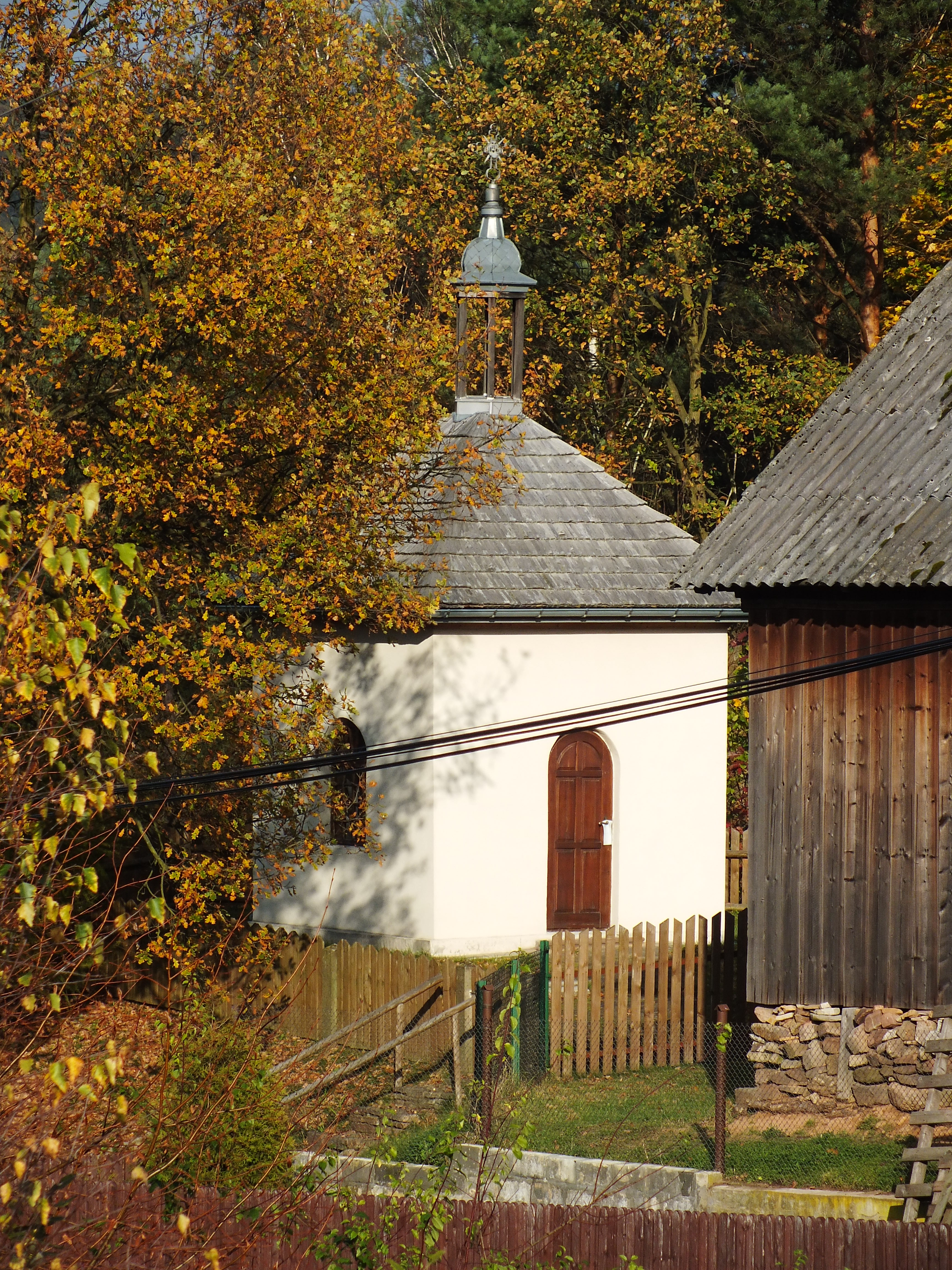
- Chapel

- Location within Poland
- Coordinates: 50°59′17″N 20°38′8″E
- Country: Poland
- Voivodeship: Świętokrzyskie
- County: Kielce
- Gmina: Zagnańsk
- Population: 709

Janaszów [jaˈnaʂuf] is a village in the administrative district of Gmina Zagnańsk, within Kielce County, Świętokrzyskie Voivodeship, in south-central Poland. It lies approximately 3 km (2 mi) north-west of Zagnańsk and 12 km (7 mi) north of the regional capital Kielce.
