= Gruszka, Kielce County =

Gruszka
- Village
- Location within Poland
- Coordinates: 50°57′38″N 20°41′47″E
- Country: Poland
- Voivodeship: Świętokrzyskie
- County: Kielce
- Gmina: Zagnańsk
- Population: 732

Gruszka [ˈɡruʂka] is a village in the administrative district of Gmina Zagnańsk, within Kielce County, Świętokrzyskie Voivodeship, in south-central Poland. It lies approximately 4 km (2 mi) south-east of Zagnańsk and 11 km (7 mi) north-east of the regional capital Kielce.
