= Umer =

- Village
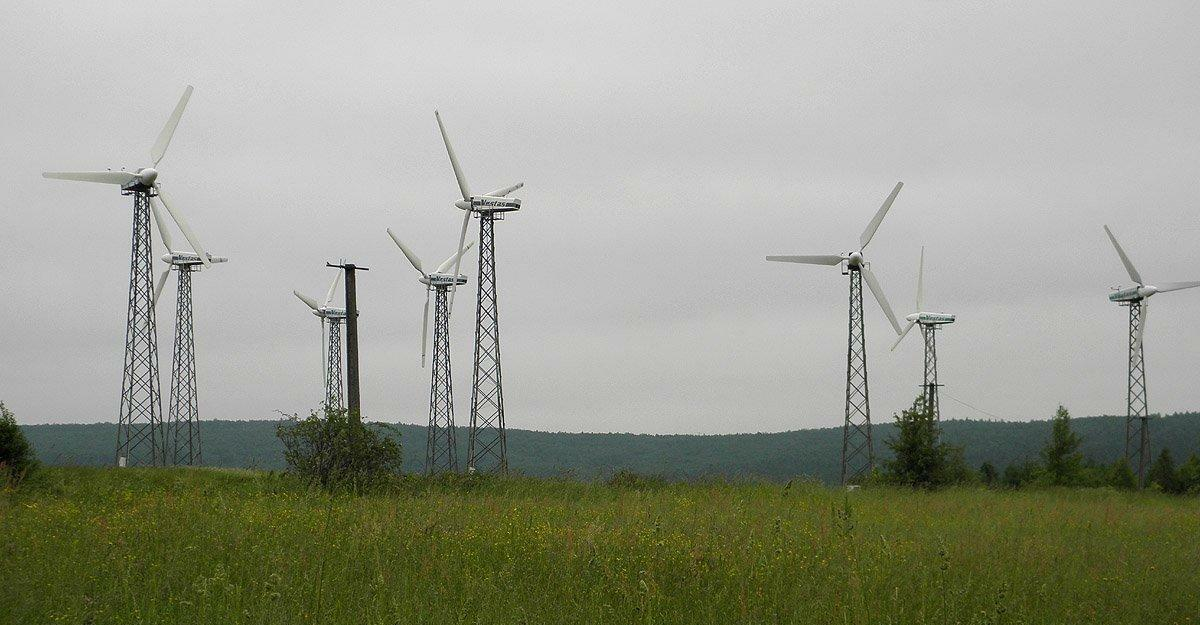
- Wind farm

- Location within Poland
- Coordinates: 50°59′20″N 20°34′44″E
- Country: Poland
- Voivodeship: Świętokrzyskie
- County: Kielce
- Gmina: Zagnańsk
- Population: 467
- Time zone: UTC+1 (CET)
  - Summer (DST): UTC+2 (CEST)
- ISO 3166 code: POL

Umer [ˈumɛr] is a village in the administrative district of Gmina Zagnańsk, within Kielce County, Świętokrzyskie Voivodeship, in south-central Poland. It lies approximately 7 km (4 mi) west of Zagnańsk and 13 km (8 mi) north of the regional capital Kielce.
