= Tumlin-Osowa =

- Village
- Location within Poland
- Coordinates: 50°58′40″N 20°35′44″E
- Country: Poland
- Voivodeship: Świętokrzyskie
- County: Kielce
- Gmina: Zagnańsk
- Population: 280

Tumlin-Osowa [ˈtumlin ɔˈsɔva] is a village in the administrative district of Gmina Zagnańsk, within Kielce County, Świętokrzyskie Voivodeship, in south-central Poland. It lies approximately 5 km (3 mi) west of Zagnańsk and 11 km (7 mi) north of the regional capital Kielce.
