= Ścięgna, Świętokrzyskie Voivodeship =

Ścięgna
- Village
- Location within Poland
- Coordinates: 50°57′50″N 20°41′26″E
- Country: Poland
- Voivodeship: Świętokrzyskie
- County: Kielce
- Gmina: Zagnańsk

Ścięgna [ˈɕt͡ɕɛŋɡna] is a village in the administrative district of Gmina Zagnańsk, within Kielce County, Świętokrzyskie Voivodeship, in south-central Poland. It lies approximately 3 km (2 mi) south-east of Zagnańsk and 11 km (7 mi) north-east of the regional capital Kielce.
