= The Giant Plane =

Species of plant

Coordinates: 52°57′59″N 14°25′47″E

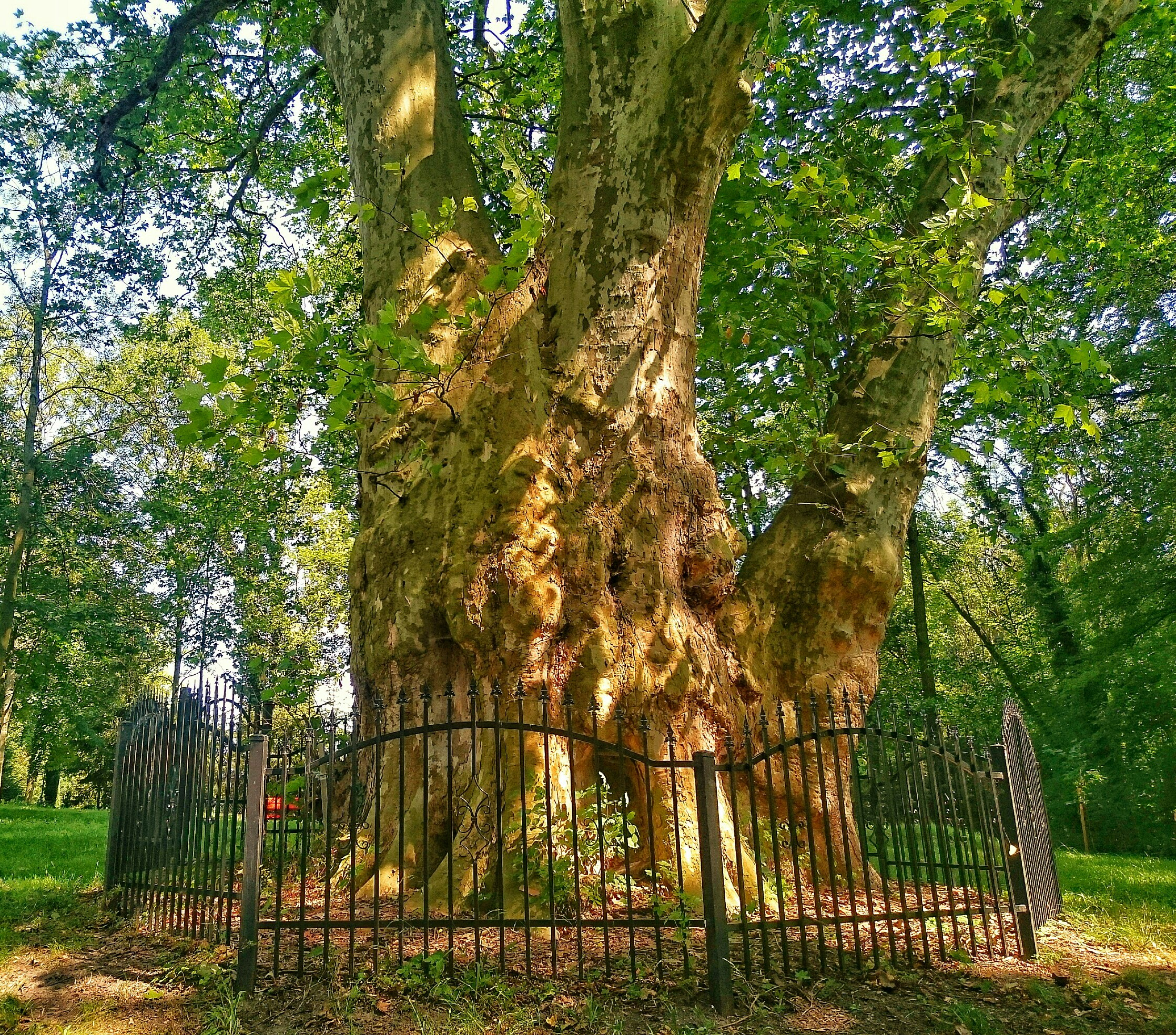
Trunk of the tree, from the west side.

The Giant is a London plane tree, located in the city Chojna, Poland. It is one of the thickest trees in the country.

The name of the tree in Polish – Olbrzym – means a very large, huge thing (even a person).

The Giant is about 300 years old, according to the dendrochronological research, and once stood in the Viereck'scher Garten. It is a monumental, 35 m tall tree with a trunk circumference of 1066 cm (in 2014, at the narrowest place, 0.45 m high). Its circumference at breast height (CBH) is 11 m (in 2015).

This plane has a large, probably multistemmed, ellipsoid trunk. It forks at heights of 2.5 and 5 m, creating a large crown.

The tree is preserved by the local government because it had been set on fire several times. Since 2011 it is fenced to protect it from birds and insects.

In 2012, it was judged among the best trees in the competition for tree of the year in Poland.

The Giant Plane is the third thickest tree in Poland, and the largest and oldest London plane in the country.

== See also ==
- Bartek oak
- Bażyński Oak
- Jagiełło Oak
