= Samsonów-Komorniki =

- Village
- Location within Poland
- Coordinates: 50°59′11″N 20°36′42″E
- Country: Poland
- Voivodeship: Świętokrzyskie
- County: Kielce
- Gmina: Zagnańsk
- Population: 110

Samsonów-Komorniki [samˈsɔnuf kɔmɔrˈniki] is a village in the administrative district of Gmina Zagnańsk, within Kielce County, Świętokrzyskie Voivodeship, in south-central Poland. It lies approximately 4 km (2 mi) west of Zagnańsk and 12 km (7 mi) north of the regional capital Kielce.
