= Kołomań =

- Village
- Location within Poland
- Coordinates: 51°0′6″N 20°36′9″E
- Country: Poland
- Voivodeship: Świętokrzyskie
- County: Kielce
- Gmina: Zagnańsk
- Population: 412

Kołomań [kɔˈwɔmaɲ] is a village in the administrative district of Gmina Zagnańsk, within Kielce County, Świętokrzyskie Voivodeship, in south-central Poland. It lies approximately 5 km (3 mi) north-west of Zagnańsk and 14 km (9 mi) north of the regional capital Kielce.
