= Przytok =

Przytok may refer to the following places:

- Przytok, Lubusz Voivodeship (west Poland)
- Przytok, Pomeranian Voivodeship (north Poland)
- Przytok, West Pomeranian Voivodeship (north-west Poland)
