= Samsonów-Dudków =

- Village
- Location within Poland
- Coordinates: 50°59′0″N 20°36′4″E
- Country: Poland
- Voivodeship: Świętokrzyskie
- County: Kielce
- Gmina: Zagnańsk
- Population: 90

Samsonów-Dudków [samˈsɔnuf ˈdutkuf] is a village in the administrative district of Gmina Zagnańsk, within Kielce County, Świętokrzyskie Voivodeship, in south-central Poland. It lies approximately 5 km (3 mi) west of Zagnańsk and 12 km (7 mi) north of the regional capital Kielce.
