= Samsonów-Piechotne =

- Village
- Location within Poland
- Coordinates: 50°59′55″N 20°37′47″E
- Country: Poland
- Voivodeship: Świętokrzyskie
- County: Kielce
- Gmina: Zagnańsk
- Population: 125

Samsonów-Piechotne [samˈsɔnuf pjɛˈxɔtnɛ] is a village in the administrative district of Gmina Zagnańsk, within Kielce County, Świętokrzyskie Voivodeship, in south-central Poland. It lies approximately 4 km (2 mi) north-west of Zagnańsk and 13 km (8 mi) north of the regional capital Kielce.
