= Tumlin-Dąbrówka =

- Village
- Location within Poland
- Coordinates: 50°58′53″N 20°35′25″E
- Country: Poland
- Voivodeship: Świętokrzyskie
- County: Kielce
- Gmina: Zagnańsk
- Population: 430

Tumlin-Dąbrówka [ˈtumlin dɔmˈbrufka] is a village in the administrative district of Gmina Zagnańsk, within Kielce County, Świętokrzyskie Voivodeship, in south-central Poland. It lies approximately 6 km (4 mi) west of Zagnańsk and 12 km (7 mi) north of the regional capital Kielce.
