= Chrusty =

Chrusty may refer to:

Places:

- Chrusty, Aleksandrów County in Kuyavian-Pomeranian Voivodeship (north-central Poland)
- Chrusty, Chełmno County in Kuyavian-Pomeranian Voivodeship (north-central Poland)
- Chrusty, Łask County in Łódź Voivodeship (central Poland)
- Chrusty, Rawa County in Łódź Voivodeship (central Poland)
- Chrusty, Świętokrzyskie Voivodeship (south-central Poland)
- Chrusty, Masovian Voivodeship (east-central Poland)
- Chrusty, Gmina Lisków in Greater Poland Voivodeship (west-central Poland)
- Chrusty, Gmina Żelazków in Greater Poland Voivodeship (west-central Poland)
- Chrusty, Konin County in Greater Poland Voivodeship (west-central Poland)

Food:

- Chrusty, a fried dough also known as Angel Wings
