= Jaworze =

Jaworze may refer to the following places in Poland:

- Jaworze, Kuyavian-Pomeranian Voivodeship (north-central Poland)
- Jaworze, Silesian Voivodeship (south Poland)
- Jaworze, Subcarpathian Voivodeship (south-east Poland)
- Jaworze, Świętokrzyskie Voivodeship (south-central Poland)
- Jaworze, West Pomeranian Voivodeship (north-west Poland)
- Gmina Jaworze, a rural gmina in Bielsko County, Silesian Voivodeship
