= Osiedle Wrzosy =

- Settlement
- Location within Poland
- Coordinates: 50°58′48″N 20°40′50″E
- Country: Poland
- Voivodeship: Świętokrzyskie
- County: Kielce
- Gmina: Zagnańsk

Osiedle Wrzosy [ɔˈɕɛdlɛ ˈvʐɔsɨ] is a settlement in the administrative district of Gmina Zagnańsk, within Kielce County, Świętokrzyskie Voivodeship, in south-central Poland. It lies approximately 2 km (1 mi) east of Zagnańsk and 12 km (7 mi) north-east of the regional capital Kielce.
