= Tumlin-Zacisze =

- Village
- Location within Poland
- Coordinates: 50°58′15″N 20°35′48″E
- Country: Poland
- Voivodeship: Świętokrzyskie
- County: Kielce
- Gmina: Zagnańsk

Tumlin-Zacisze [ˈtumlin zaˈt͡ɕiʂɛ] is a village in the administrative district of Gmina Zagnańsk, within Kielce County, Świętokrzyskie Voivodeship, in south-central Poland. It lies approximately 5 km (3 mi) west of Zagnańsk and 10 km (6 mi) north of the regional capital Kielce.
