= Borowa Góra =

Borowa Góra may refer to the following places:

- Borowa Góra, Masovian Voivodeship (east-central Poland)
- Borowa Góra, Subcarpathian Voivodeship (south-east Poland)
- Borowa Góra, Świętokrzyskie Voivodeship (south-central Poland)
