= Kajetanów, Świętokrzyskie Voivodeship =

Kajetanów
- Village
- Location within Poland
- Coordinates: 50°56′42″N 20°41′43″E
- Country: Poland
- Voivodeship: Świętokrzyskie
- County: Kielce
- Gmina: Zagnańsk
- Population: 1,221

Kajetanów [kajɛˈtanuf] is a village in the administrative district of Gmina Zagnańsk, within Kielce County, Świętokrzyskie Voivodeship, in south-central Poland. It lies approximately 5 km (3 mi) south-east of Zagnańsk and 9 km (6 mi) north-east of the regional capital Kielce.
