= Długojów =

- Village
- Location within Poland
- Coordinates: 51°1′54″N 20°36′19″E
- Country: Poland
- Voivodeship: Świętokrzyskie
- County: Kielce
- Gmina: Zagnańsk
- Population: 104

Długojów [dwuˈɡɔjuf] is a village in the administrative district of Gmina Zagnańsk, within Kielce County, Świętokrzyskie Voivodeship, in south-central Poland. It lies approximately 8 km (5 mi) north-west of Zagnańsk and 17 km (11 mi) north of the regional capital Kielce.
