= Droszków, Lubusz Voivodeship =

Droszków
- Wieś
- Location within Poland
- Coordinates: 51°55′52″N 15°39′39″E
- Państwo: Poland
- Województwo: lubuskie
- Powiat: zielonogórski
- Gmina: Zabór

Droszków [ˈdrɔʂkuf] – wieś w województwie lubuskim, w powiecie zielonogórskim, w gminie Zabór.

== Historia ==
Droszków jest jedną z najstarszych miejscowości w okolicy Zielonej Góry. Wieś istniała już w średniowieczu i przez wieki rozwijała się jako osada o charakterze rolniczym.

W przeszłości miejscowość znajdowała się w granicach państwa pruskiego, a następnie Niemiec. Po zakończeniu II wojny światowej wieś znalazła się w granicach Polski, a dotychczasowa ludność niemiecka została wysiedlona. Droszków zasiedlili osadnicy polscy, głównie z terenów wschodnich.

W wyniku reformy administracyjnej z 1999 roku Droszków znalazł się w granicach województwa lubuskiego.

== Geografia ==
Wieś położona jest w zachodniej części Polski, w pobliżu Zielonej Góry. Okolicę charakteryzują tereny rolnicze oraz kompleksy leśne typowe dla regionu lubuskiego.
