= Wielobłota =

- Village
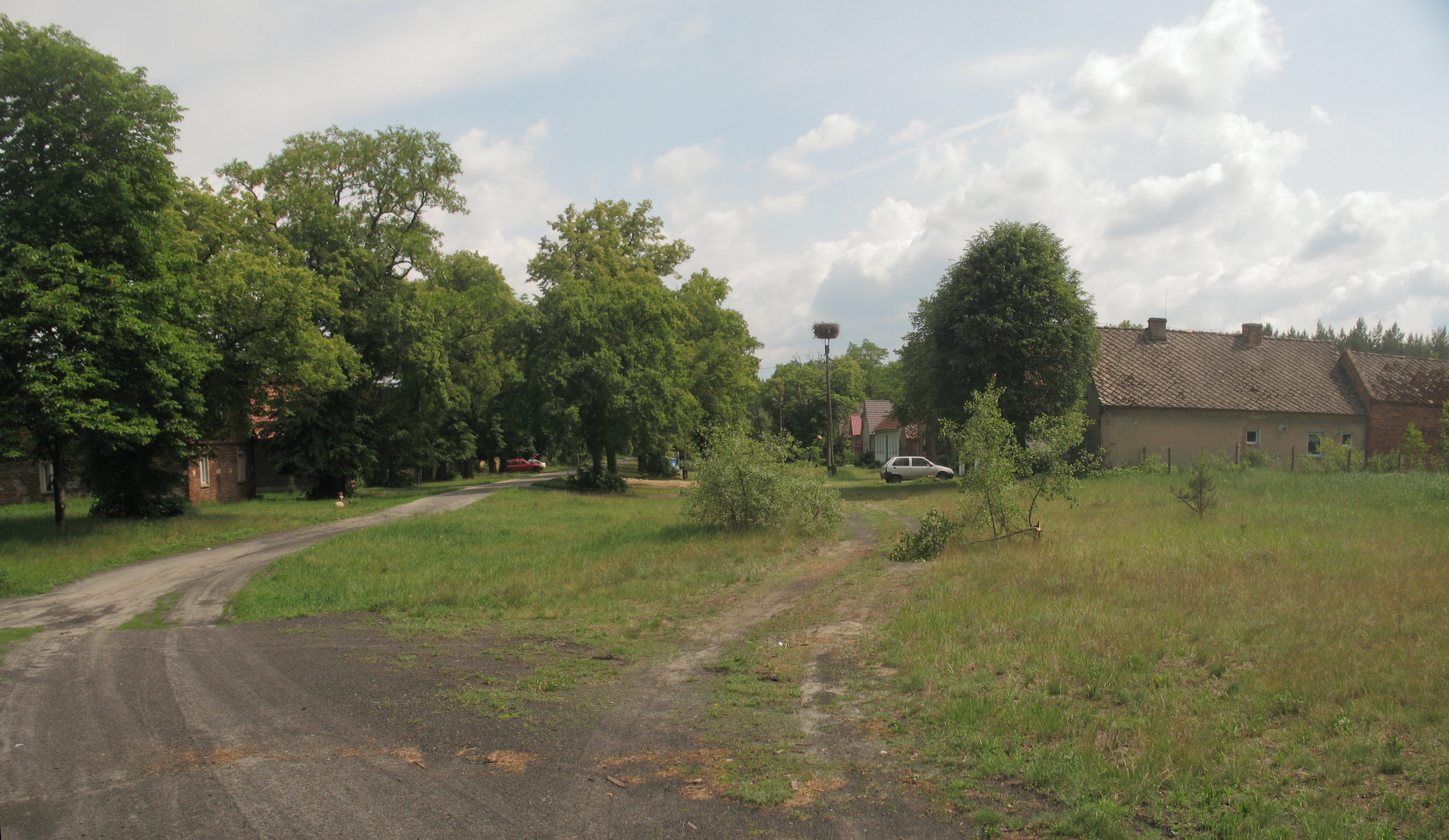

- Location within Poland
- Coordinates: 51°58′20″N 15°40′47″E
- Country: Poland
- Voivodeship: Lubusz
- County: Zielona Góra
- Gmina: Zabór
- Population: 51

Wielobłota [vjɛlɔˈbwɔta] is a village in the administrative district of Gmina Zabór, within Zielona Góra County, Lubusz Voivodeship, in western Poland.
