= Czarna, Lubusz Voivodeship =

Czarna
- Village
- Location within Poland
- Coordinates: 51°54′N 15°42′E
- Country: Poland
- Voivodeship: Lubusz
- County: Zielona Góra
- Gmina: Zabór

Czarna [ˈt͡ʂarna] is a village in the administrative district of Gmina Zabór, within Zielona Góra County, Lubusz Voivodeship, in western Poland.
