= Proczki =

- Settlement
- Location within Poland
- Coordinates: 51°56′0″N 15°44′54″E
- Country: Poland
- Voivodeship: Lubusz
- County: Zielona Góra
- Gmina: Zabór
- Population: 21

Proczki [ˈprɔt͡ʂki] (German: Ludwigsthal) is a settlement in the administrative district of Gmina Zabór, within Zielona Góra County, Lubusz Voivodeship, in western Poland.

The settlement has a population of 21.

== Notable residents ==
- Rudolf Sieckenius (16 May 1896 – 28 April 1945), Wehrmacht general
