= Rajewo =

- Settlement
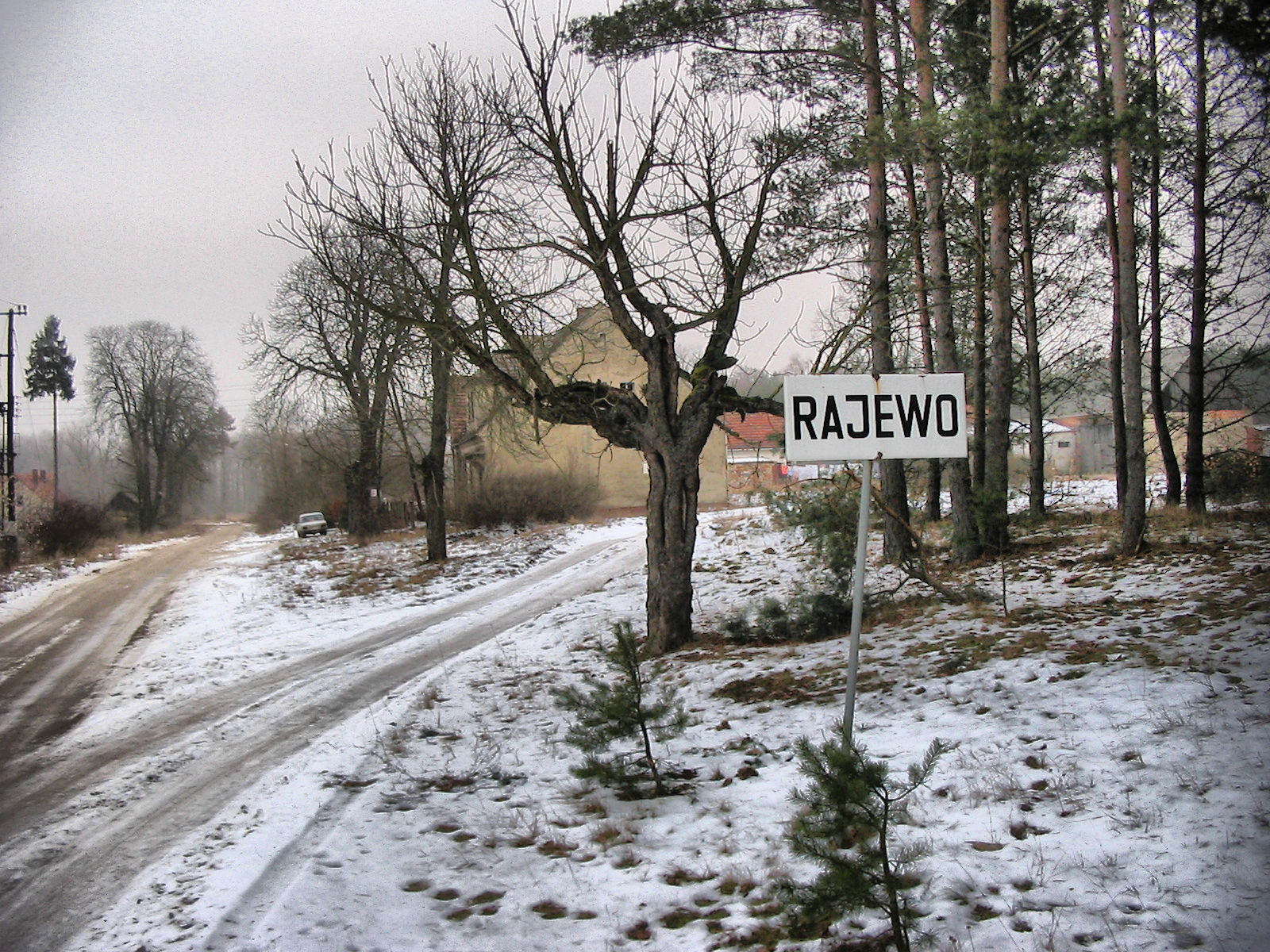

- Location within Poland
- Coordinates: 51°58′45″N 15°38′30″E
- Country: Poland
- Voivodeship: Lubusz
- County: Zielona Góra
- Gmina: Zabór
- Population: 3

Rajewo [raˈjɛvɔ] is a settlement in the administrative district of Gmina Zabór, within Zielona Góra County, Lubusz Voivodeship, in western Poland.
