= Kaniów, Świętokrzyskie Voivodeship =

Village in Poland

Kaniów
- Village
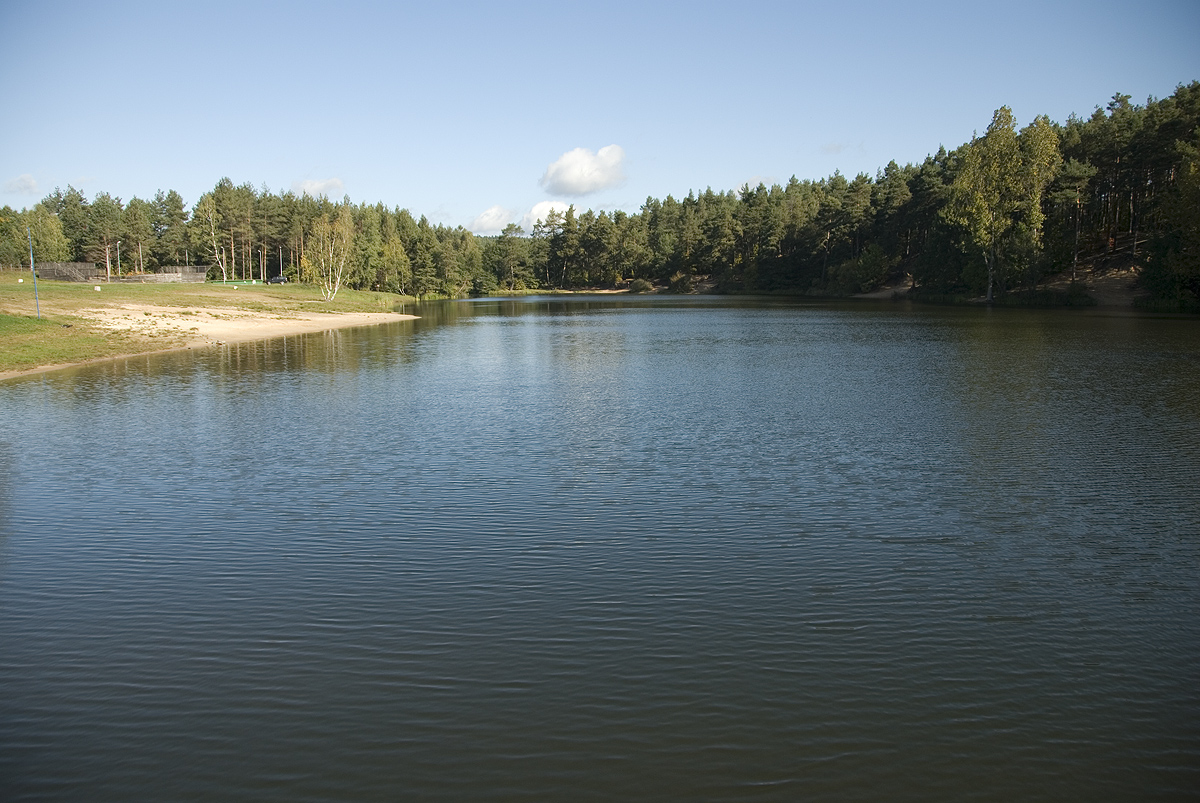
- Lake

- Location within Poland
- Coordinates: 50°59′14″N 20°39′46″E
- Country: Poland
- Voivodeship: Świętokrzyskie
- County: Kielce
- Gmina: Zagnańsk
- Population: 1,257

Kaniów [ˈkaɲuf] is a village in the administrative district of Gmina Zagnańsk, within Kielce County, Świętokrzyskie Voivodeship, in south-central Poland. It lies approximately 1 km (1 mi) north of Zagnańsk and 12 km (7 mi) north of the regional capital Kielce.
