= Łaz, Zielona Góra County =

Łaz
- Village
- Location within Poland
- Coordinates: 51°56′N 15°41′E
- Country: Poland
- Voivodeship: Lubusz
- County: Zielona Góra
- Gmina: Zabór
- Population: 480

Łaz [was] is a village in the administrative district of Gmina Zabór, within Zielona Góra County, Lubusz Voivodeship, in western Poland.
