= Gmina Zagnańsk =

Gmina Zagnańsk Zagnańsk Commune
- Gmina
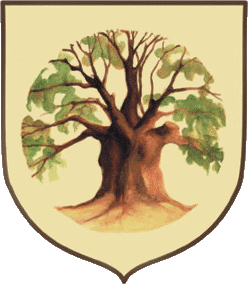
- Coat of arms
- Interactive map of Gmina Zagnańsk
- Coordinates (Zagnańsk): 50°58′49″N 20°39′52″E
- Country: Poland
- Voivodeship: Świętokrzyskie
- County: Kielce County
- Seat: Zagnańsk

Area
  - Total: 124.37 km^{2} (48.02 sq mi)

Population (2006)
  - Total: 12,746
  - Density: 102.48/km^{2} (265.43/sq mi)
- Website: http://www.zagnansk.pl/

Gmina Zagnańsk is a rural gmina (administrative district) in Kielce County, Świętokrzyskie Voivodeship, in south-central Poland. Its seat is the village of Zagnańsk, which lies approximately 12 kilometres (7 mi) north of the regional capital Kielce.

The gmina covers an area of 124.37 square kilometres (48.0 sq mi), and as of 2006 its total population is 12,746.

== Villages ==
Gmina Zagnańsk contains the villages and settlements of Bartków, Belno, Borowa Góra, Chrusty, Długojów, Gruszka, Janaszów, Jasiów, Jaworze, Kajetanów, Kaniów, Kołomań, Lekomin, Osiedle Wrzosy, Samsonów, Samsonów-Ciągłe, Samsonów-Dudków, Samsonów-Komorniki, Samsonów-Piechotne, Ścięgna, Siodła, Szałas, Tumlin-Dąbrówka, Tumlin-Osowa, Tumlin-Węgle, Tumlin-Zacisze, Umer, Zabłocie, Zachełmie and Zagnańsk.

== Neighbouring gminas ==
Gmina Zagnańsk is bordered by the gminas of Bliżyn, Łączna, Masłów, Miedziana Góra, Mniów and Stąporków.
