= Mielno, Zielona Góra County =

Mielno
- Settlement
- Location within Poland
- Coordinates: 51°58′2″N 15°44′0″E
- Country: Poland
- Voivodeship: Lubusz
- County: Zielona Góra
- Gmina: Zabór
- Population: 22

Mielno [ˈmjɛlnɔ] is a settlement in the administrative district of Gmina Zabór, within Zielona Góra County, Lubusz Voivodeship, in western Poland.
