= Tarnawa, Lubusz Voivodeship =

Tarnawa
- Village
- Location within Poland
- Coordinates: 51°58′N 15°42′E
- Country: Poland
- Voivodeship: Lubusz
- County: Zielona Góra
- Gmina: Zabór

Tarnawa [tarˈnava] (German: Ober-Hammer/Nieder-Hammer) is a village in the administrative district of Gmina Zabór, within Zielona Góra County, Lubusz Voivodeship, in western Poland.
