= Napoleon Oak (Lausanne) =

Oak tree in Lausanne, Switzerland

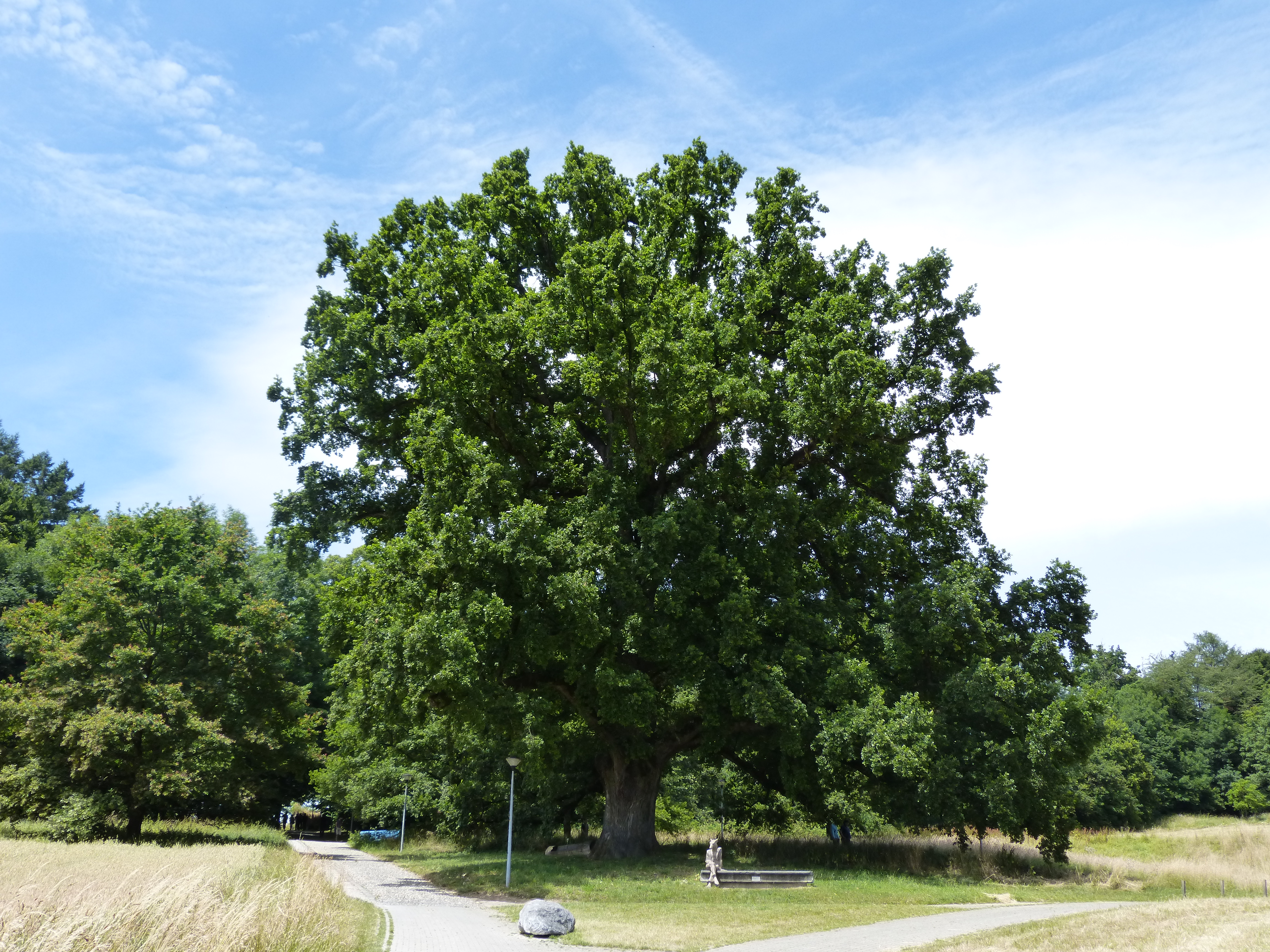

The Napoleon Oak in Lausanne is a single, living individual of Quercus robur in Lausanne, Switzerland known to have been present during Napoleon Bonaparte's march to Italy in 1800. It has recently been subjected to extensive genomic research, one of the few examples of such in a very long-lived organism. It was replanted in 1800 when it was 22 years old in the center of what was the Dorigny estate, traditionally in honor of Napoleon when he stopped there on his way to the conquest of Italy. It now stands as a living historical monument on the Dorigny campus of the University of Lausanne. In 2012, the tree was dated as 234 years old by dendrochronology.

The tree, called Chêne de Napoléon in French, is about 30 metres (100 ft) high with the base of its trunk being about 7 metres (23 ft) in circumference. Because of its age, it is supported with 140 metres (460 ft) of cables.

In 2017, researchers performed whole-genome sequencing on the tree, and they found that, despite being centuries old, the apical meristem of the lower and upper branches have developed remarkably low levels of single nucleotide variant (SNV) somatic mutations. Most mutations present are likely due to UV radiation. Information on this individual's genome is being presented as the Napoleome.

== See also ==
- Napoleon Oak, another tree named after Napoleon located in Zabór, Poland.
