= Gmina Zabór =

Gmina Zabór Zabór Commune
- Gmina
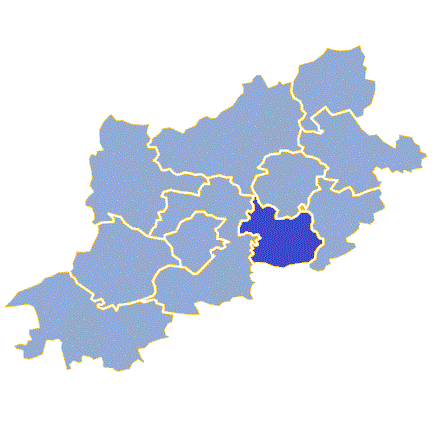
- Gmina Zabór in Zielona Góra County

- Location within Poland
- Coordinates (Zabór): 51°57′N 15°43′E
- Country: Poland
- Voivodeship: Lubusz
- County: Zielona Góra
- Seat: Zabór

Area
  - Total: 93.34 km^{2} (36.04 sq mi)

Population (2019-06-30)
  - Total: 4,282
  - Density: 45.88/km^{2} (118.8/sq mi)
- Website: http://www.gminazabor.pl/

Gmina Zabór is a rural gmina (administrative district) in Zielona Góra County, Lubusz Voivodeship, in western Poland. Its seat is the village of Zabór, which lies approximately 15 kilometres (9 mi) east of Zielona Góra.

The gmina covers an area of 93.34 square kilometres (36.0 sq mi), and as of 2019 its total population is 4,282.

== Villages ==
Gmina Zabór contains the villages and settlements of Czarna, Dąbrowa, Droszków, Łaz, Mielno, Milsko, Proczki, Przytoczki, Przytok, Rajewo, Tarnawa, Wielobłota and Zabór.

== Neighbouring gminas ==
Gmina Zabór is bordered by the gminas of Bojadła, Otyń, Sulechów, Trzebiechów and Zielona Góra.

== Twin towns – sister cities ==
Gmina Zabór is twinned with:

- Amt Barnim-Oderbruch, Germany
