= Chrobry Oak =

Largest oak tree in Poland

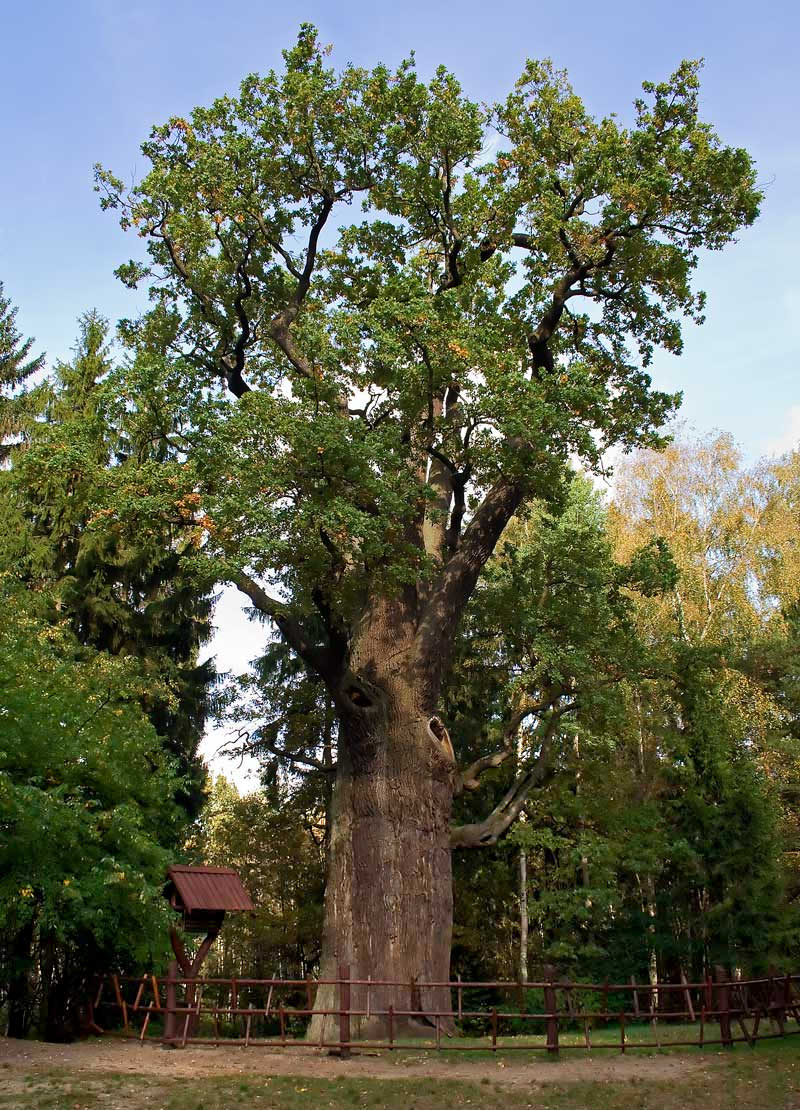
- Chrobry Oak

- Location within Poland
- Species: European oak (Quercus robur)
- Location: Poland
- Coordinates: 51°31′43″N 15°41′47″E

The Chrobry Oak is an oak tree, the largest oak in Poland and one of the biggest in Europe.

It is monumental oak with single-stemmed, hollow trunk, its girth was 1004 cm, height – 26 m and volume – 90 m³ (in 2014). Moreover, it is the oldest oak tree in Poland. Age of the Chrobry is about 760 years, according to dendrochronological research.

Oak was officially preserved (as a natural monument) since 1966.

Chrobry was measured in 1908 at the earliest, by Theodor Schube (German botanist), girth of the tree was 861 cm.

Tree was set on fire by vandals in November 2014. Chrobry remained in fatal condition, but in 2015 part of the crown was still alive.

== See also ==
- Bartek (oak)
- Bażyński Oak
- Sobieski Oak
