= Cielętniki, Silesian Voivodeship =

Cielętniki
- Village
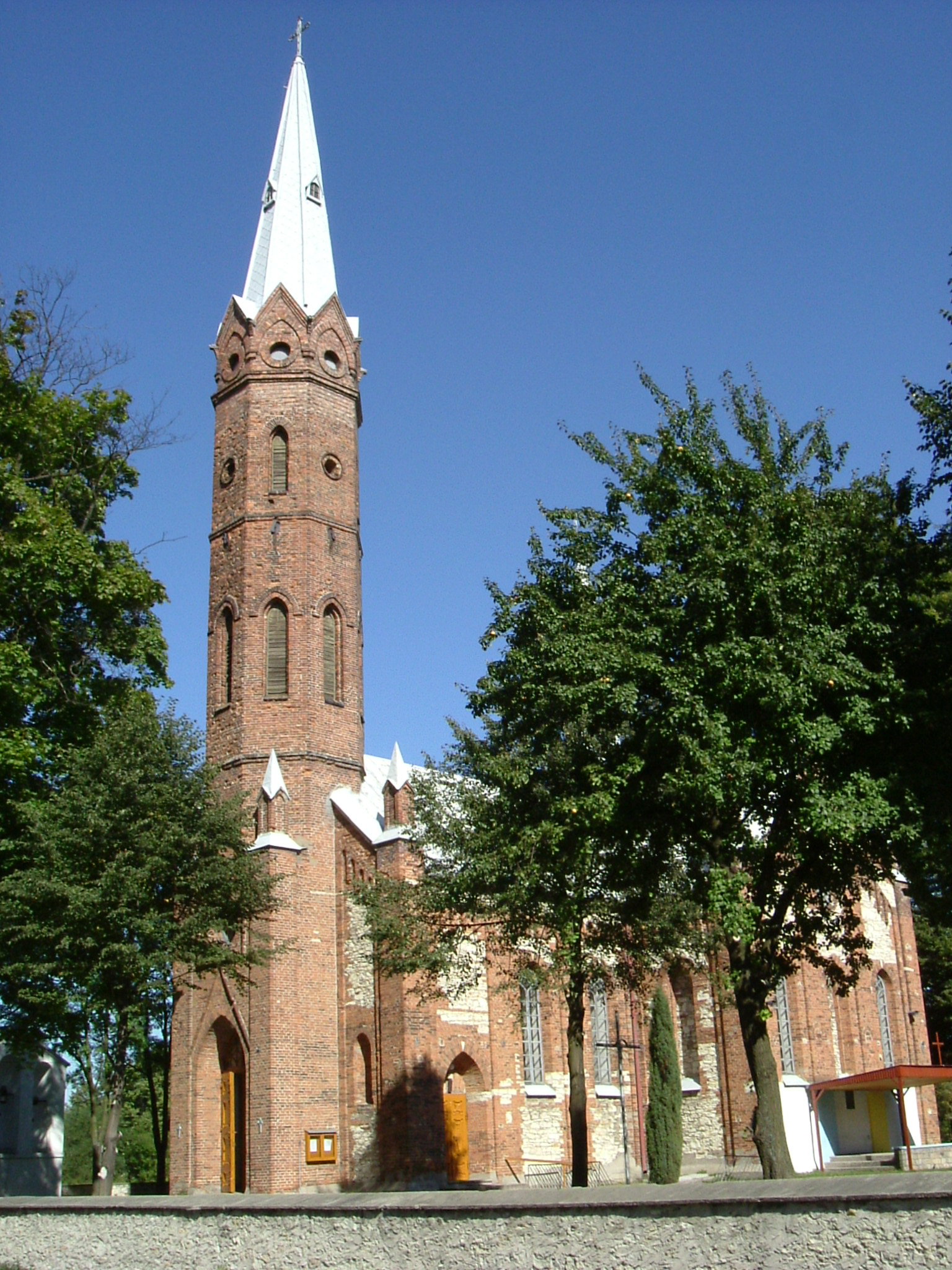
- Church of the Transfiguration in Cielętniki

- Location within Poland
- Coordinates: 50°53′N 19°34′E
- Country: Poland
- Voivodeship: Silesian
- County: Częstochowa
- Gmina: Dąbrowa Zielona
- Population: 457
- Time zone: UTC+1 (CET)
  - Summer (DST): UTC+2 (CEST)
- Vehicle registration: SCZ

Cielętniki [t͡ɕɛlɛntˈniki] is a village in the administrative district of Gmina Dąbrowa Zielona, within Częstochowa County, Silesian Voivodeship, in southern Poland.

In the Cielętniki grows the largest tree in Poland — it is monumental lime tree, known as Lime in Cielętniki.

== History ==
The Palace in the center of the village was built by the Kurnatowski family, as was the church.

On 4 September 1939, during the German invasion of Poland which started World War II, German troops carried out a massacre of Polish farmers and children in the village (see Nazi crimes against the Polish nation).
