= Zabór =

- Village
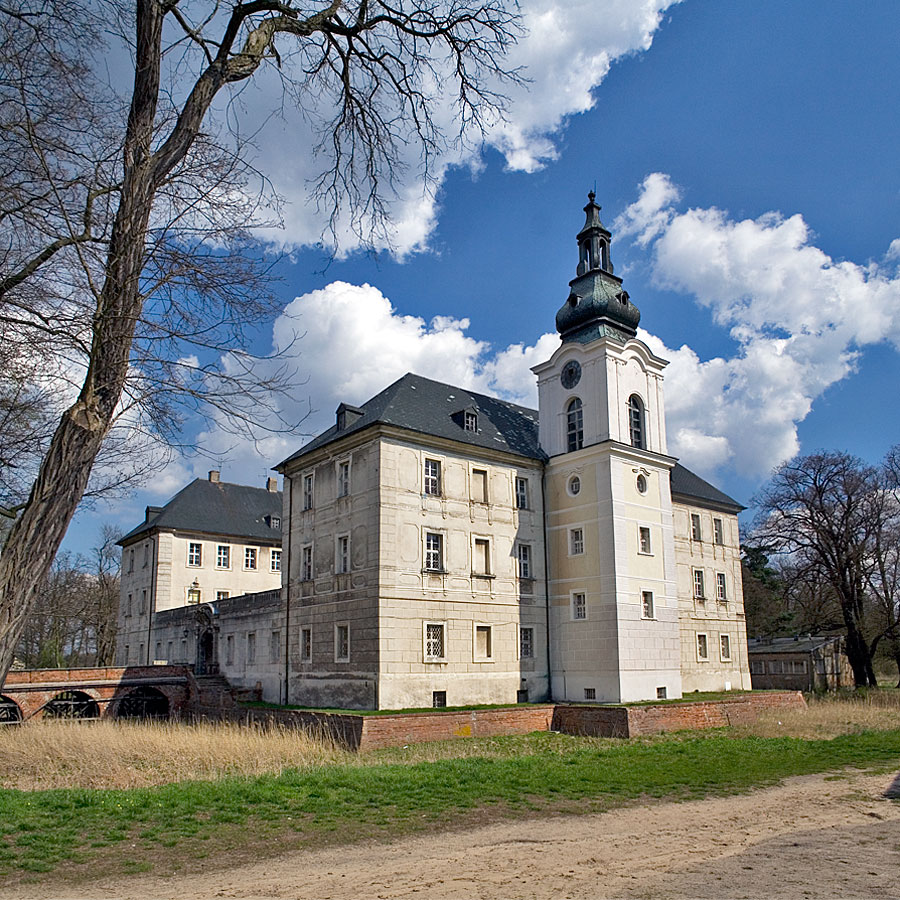
- Zabór Castle

- Location within Poland
- Coordinates: 51°57′N 15°43′E
- Country: Poland
- Voivodeship: Lubusz
- County: Zielona Góra
- Gmina: Zabór

Population
  - Total: 950
- Time zone: UTC+1 (CET)
  - Summer (DST): UTC+2 (CEST)
- Vehicle registration: FZI

Zabór [ˈzabur] (German: Saabor, 1936-45: Fürsteneich) is a village and the seat of the gmina (administrative district) called Gmina Zabór in Zielona Góra County, Lubusz Voivodeship, in western Poland.

It is on the northern and western shores of the Liwno Wielkie Lake and has a population of about 950.

== History ==
The area became part of the emerging Polish state in the 10th century. Following the fragmentation of Poland into smaller duchies, it formed part of the duchies of Silesia and Głogów, remaining under rule of the Polish houses of Piast and Jagiellon until 1506. It was first mentioned in the early 14th century under the Latinized name Saborin. The name is of Polish origin and comes from the words za and bór, meaning "behind a coniferous forest".

In 1842, the village had a population of 470.

In 1936, the Nazi government of Germany, renamed the village to Fürsteneich in attempt to erase traces of Polish origin. Following World War II, the village became again part of Poland, and its historic Polish name Zabór was restored.

Napoleon Oak grew near Zabór, tree collapsed due to an arson in May 2010. It was one of the largest oaks in Europe.
