= Jaworze, Świętokrzyskie Voivodeship =

Jaworze
- Village
- Location within Poland
- Coordinates: 50°57′25″N 20°40′5″E
- Country: Poland
- Voivodeship: Świętokrzyskie
- County: Kielce
- Gmina: Zagnańsk
- Population: 438

Jaworze [jaˈvɔʐɛ] is a village in the administrative district of Gmina Zagnańsk, within Kielce County, Świętokrzyskie Voivodeship, in south-central Poland. It lies approximately 3 km (2 mi) south of Zagnańsk and 9 km (6 mi) north-east of the regional capital Kielce.
