= Przytoczki =

- Settlement
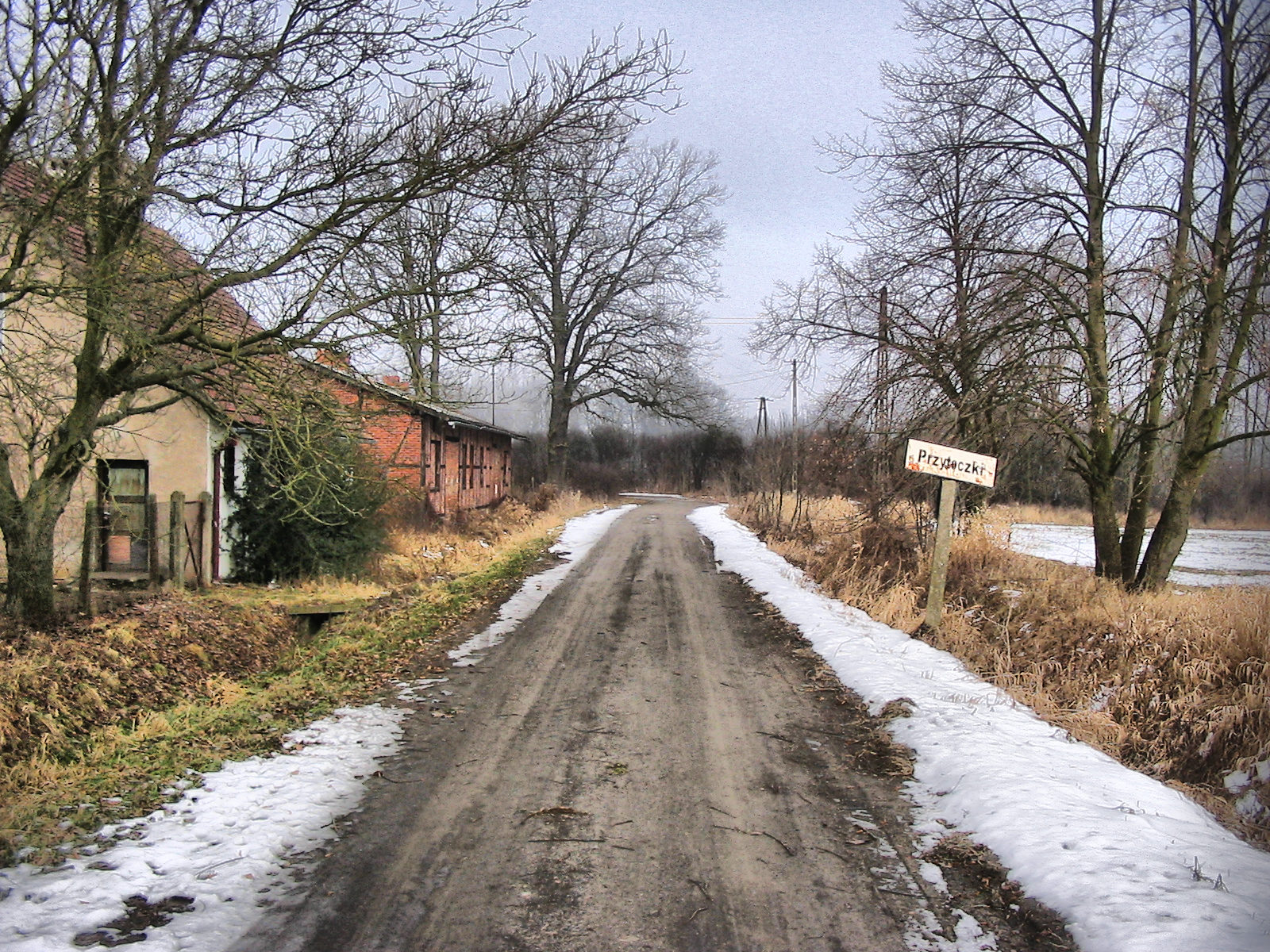

- Location within Poland
- Coordinates: 51°59′31″N 15°38′48″E
- Country: Poland
- Voivodeship: Lubusz
- County: Zielona Góra
- Gmina: Zabór
- Population: 3

Przytoczki [pʂɨˈtɔt͡ʂki] is a settlement in the administrative district of Gmina Zabór, within Zielona Góra County, Lubusz Voivodeship, in western Poland.
