= Dąbrowa, Zielona Góra County =

Dąbrowa
- Village
- Location within Poland
- Coordinates: 51°54′39″N 15°44′51″E
- Country: Poland
- Voivodeship: Lubusz
- County: Zielona Góra
- Gmina: Zabór

Dąbrowa [dɔmˈbrɔva] is a village in the administrative district of Gmina Zabór, within Zielona Góra County, Lubusz Voivodeship, in western Poland.
