= Borowa Góra, Świętokrzyskie Voivodeship =

Borowa Góra
- Village
- Location within Poland
- Coordinates: 50°59′23″N 20°40′41″E
- Country: Poland
- Voivodeship: Świętokrzyskie
- County: Kielce
- Gmina: Zagnańsk
- Population: 276

Borowa Góra [bɔˈrɔva ˈɡura] is a village in the administrative district of Gmina Zagnańsk, within Kielce County, Świętokrzyskie Voivodeship, in south-central Poland. It lies approximately 2 km (1 mi) north-east of Zagnańsk and 13 km (8 mi) north of the regional capital Kielce.
