= Chrusty, Świętokrzyskie Voivodeship =

Village in Świętokrzyskie Voivodeship, Poland

Chrusty
- Village
- Location within Poland
- Coordinates: 50°58′10″N 20°40′36″E
- Country: Poland
- Voivodeship: Świętokrzyskie
- County: Kielce
- Gmina: Zagnańsk
- Population: 407

Chrusty is a village in the administrative district of Gmina Zagnańsk, within Kielce County, Świętokrzyskie Voivodeship, in south-central Poland. It lies approximately 2 kilometres (1 mi) south-east of Zagnańsk and 11 km (7 mi) north-east of the regional capital Kielce. The village has a population of 407.
