= Przytok, Lubusz Voivodeship =

Przytok
- Village
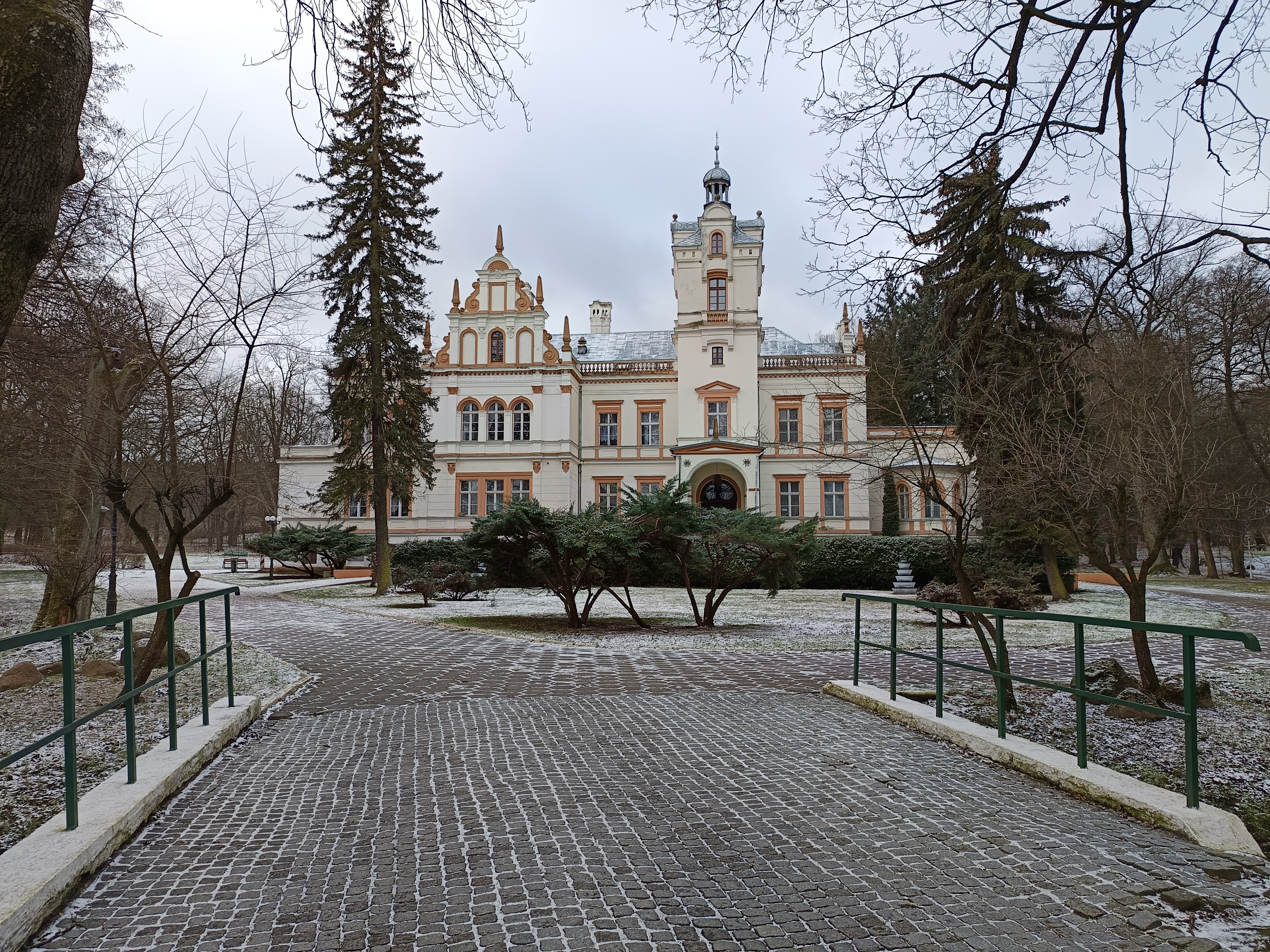
- Palace

- Location within Poland
- Coordinates: 51°57′N 15°37′E
- Country: Poland
- Voivodeship: Lubusz
- County: Zielona Góra
- Gmina: Zabór
- Population: 610

Przytok [ˈpʂɨtɔk] (German: Prittag) is a village in the administrative district of Gmina Zabór, within Zielona Góra County, Lubusz Voivodeship, in western Poland.
