= Jagiełło Oak =

Oaks in Poland

Coordinates: 52°43′42.6″N 23°50′02″E

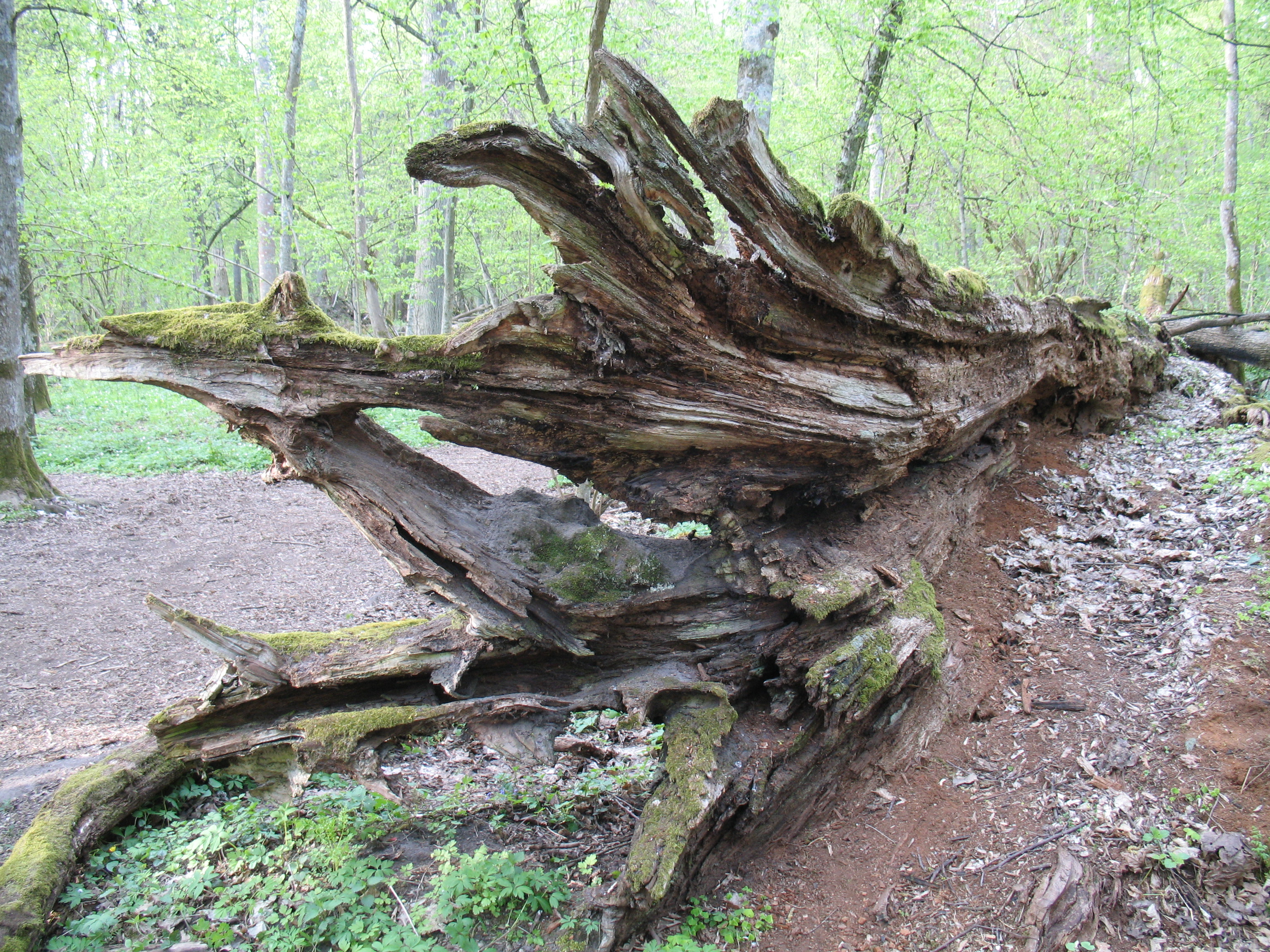
Trunk of The Jagiełło Oak.

The Jagiełło Oak is the most noted of the Białowieża Forest oaks in Poland, near the border with Belarus. The tree was blown down on November 2, 1974, at which time it had a circumference of 550 cm (220 in) at breast height and a height of 39 m (128 ft); it had large branches and a well-developed crown. The fallen trunk can still be seen in the Białowieża National Park.

King Władysław II Jagiełło is said to have rested beneath the tree before the Battle of Grunwald in 1410 – however at its death the tree is thought to have been no more than 450 years old, which would mean it did not begin growing until around 1524.
