= Bażyński Oak =

Oak tree in Poland

Coordinates: 54°17′45″N 19°29′15″E

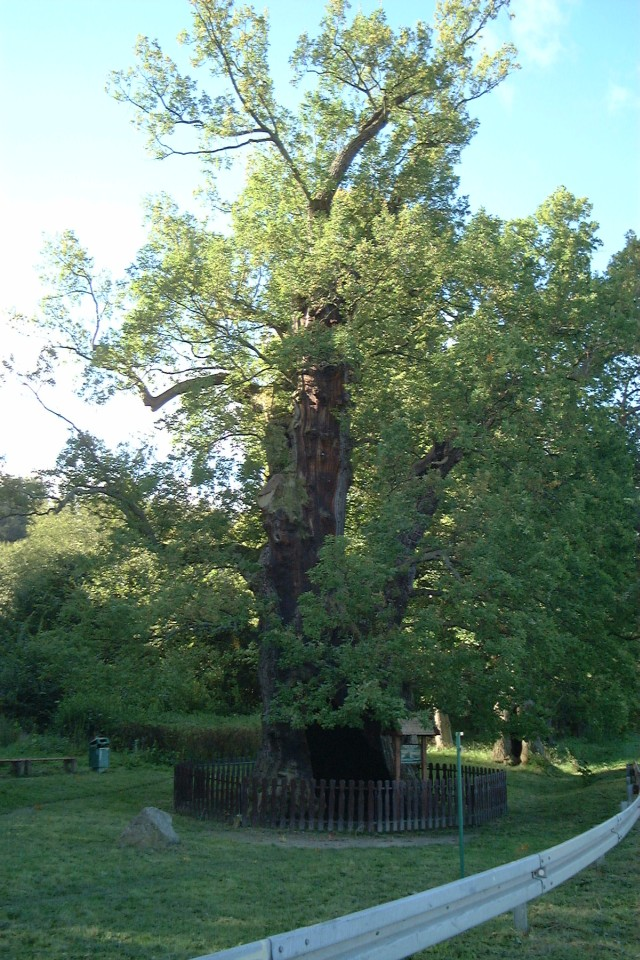
Bażyński Oak

The Bażyński Oak is an oak tree and natural monument in Poland. It is one of the oldest trees in Poland, whose age is estimated at around 716 years according to dendrochronological research. It grows in the town of Kadyny on the Vistula Lagoon.

The circumference of the tree is 10.03 metres and its height is 21 metres. The crown spread is 14 by 21.5 m. The Bażyński Oak's circumference near the ground is exceptional – around 15 metres.

It is named after Jan Bażyński (also known as Johannes von Baysen), a former owner of Kadyny and one of the founders of the Prussian Confederation.

In 1880 the oak's trunk was 8.64 metres thick and the radius of its crown was 13 metres; at the time its large hollow was fitted with a wooden door and a guard was posted to protect it. One of the owners of Kadyny, Artur Brikner, claimed that eleven soldiers could stay in the hollow trunk. What is more, in the first years of the 20th century, the trunk was part of the brew (beer) pub and the currency exchange.

The area around the Bażyński Oak also includes six other old oaks which are also on the registry of Polish national monuments.

== See also ==
- Bartek (oak)
- Sobieski Oak
