= Bartek (tree) =

One of the oldest oak trees in Poland

Coordinates: 50°59′15″N 20°39′00″E

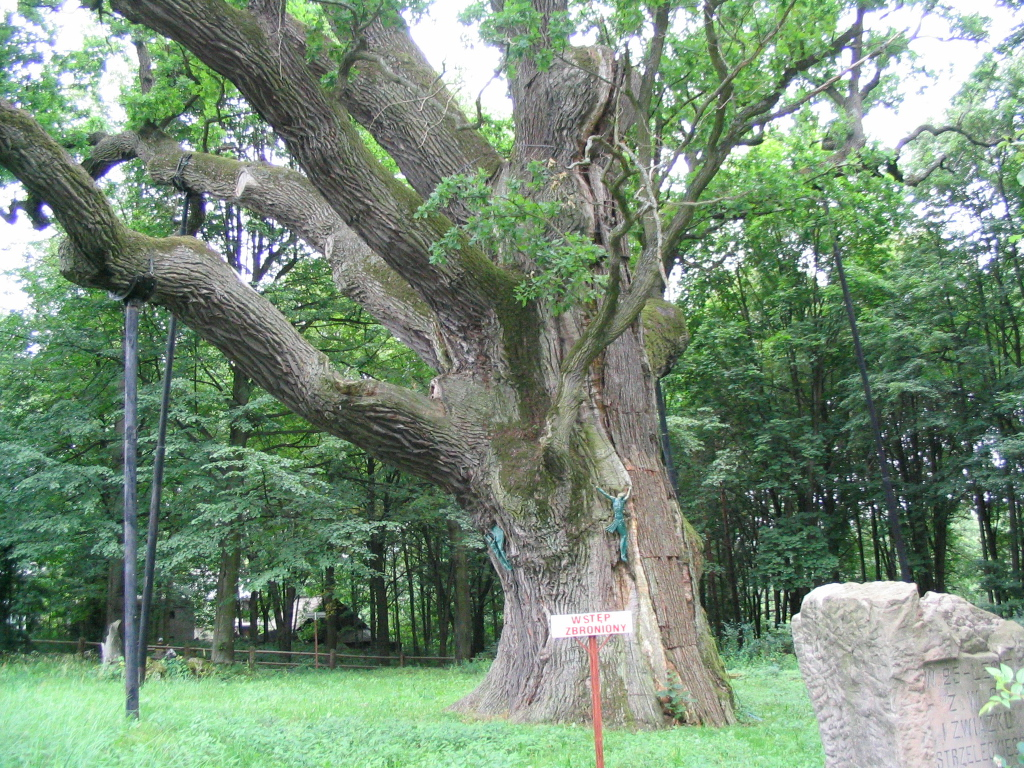
Bartek

The Bartek Oak (Polish: Dąb Bartek) is one of the oldest oak trees in Poland. It grows in Zagnańsk near Kielce in the Świętokrzyskie Mountains. Its age, previously estimated at up to 1200 years, has recently been established to be 686 years (in 2016), with a corer used to extract a sample for a ring count. An accurate count is impossible, as Bartek's interior has hollowed with age. There are several older trees in Poland, both oaks and yews (some over 1000 years old), yet none of them have matched Bartek's fame.

The 33.5-metre tall Bartek measures 970 cm at CBH (circumference at breast height) and 13.5 metres in girth at its base. Its crown spreads about 40 metres. Legend has it that King Casimir III (1310–1370) held court under Bartek and that King Jan III Sobieski rested under the oak on his way back from the Battle of Vienna (1683). He reputedly hid a Turkish sabre, an arquebus and a bottle of wine inside it to commemorate the victory.

The oak is still alive, but is in decline. In 1829 it had 14 main branches, today only 8 are left. In the 1920s the hollow inside the trunk was covered with limestone. The limestone was removed in the 1960s, replaced with resin-based filling and covered with bark. The living sapwood is very thin (5–20 cm). The weakened trunk has begun to lean toward the heavy branches.

== See also ==
- Bażyński Oak
- Jagiełło Oak
- The Giant Plane
- List of individual trees
