= Zagnańsk =

- Village
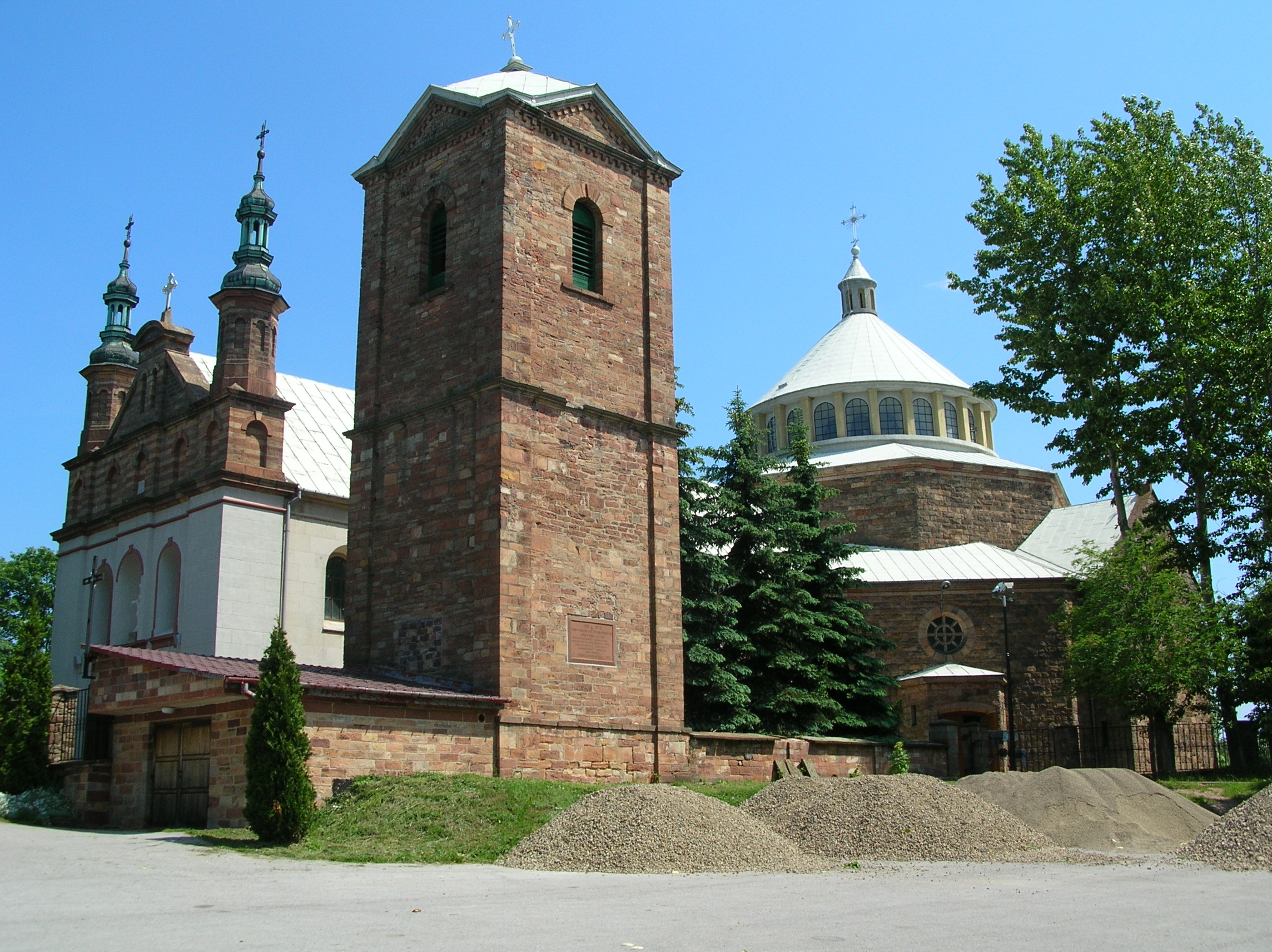
- Church of Saints Rosalia and Martin

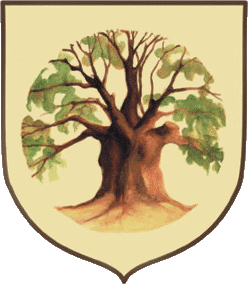
- Coat of arms

- Location within Poland
- Coordinates: 50°58′49″N 20°39′52″E
- Country: Poland
- Voivodeship: Świętokrzyskie
- County: Kielce
- Gmina: Zagnańsk

Population
  - Total: 1,726

Zagnańsk [ˈzaɡnaɲsk] is a village in Kielce County, Świętokrzyskie Voivodeship, in south-central Poland. It is the seat of the gmina (administrative district) called Gmina Zagnańsk. It lies approximately 12 km (7 mi) north of the regional capital Kielce.

The Bartek oak tree in the village is almost 686 years old.
