= Krzemionka =

Krzemionka could refer to:

- Krzemionka, stream in Subcarpathian Voivodeship, tributary of Dukiełka
- Krzemionka, village in Greater Poland Voivodeship
- Krzemionka, part of Wilkowo village in Lubusz Voivodeship
