= Podlesie =

Podlesie may refer to:

- Podlesie, Dzierżoniów County in Lower Silesian Voivodeship (south-west Poland)
- Podlesie, Wałbrzych County in Lower Silesian Voivodeship (south-west Poland)
- Podlesie, Biłgoraj County in Lublin Voivodeship (east Poland)
- Podlesie, Kraśnik County in Lublin Voivodeship (east Poland)
- Podlesie, Bełchatów County in Łódź Voivodeship (central Poland)
- Podlesie, Rawa County in Łódź Voivodeship (central Poland)
- Podlesie, Dąbrowa County in Lesser Poland Voivodeship (south Poland)
- Podlesie, Olkusz County in Lesser Poland Voivodeship (south Poland)
- Podlesie, Oświęcim County in Lesser Poland Voivodeship (south Poland)
- Podlesie, Gmina Czarna in Subcarpathian Voivodeship (south-east Poland)
- Podlesie, Busko County in Świętokrzyskie Voivodeship (south-central Poland)
- Podlesie, Gmina Pilzno in Subcarpathian Voivodeship (south-east Poland)
- Podlesie, Jędrzejów County in Świętokrzyskie Voivodeship (south Poland)
- Podlesie, Kielce County in Świętokrzyskie Voivodeship (south-central Poland)
- Podlesie, Leżajsk County in Subcarpathian Voivodeship (south-east Poland)
- Podlesie, Lubaczów County in Subcarpathian Voivodeship (south-east Poland)
- Podlesie, Końskie County in Świętokrzyskie Voivodeship (south-central Poland)
- Podlesie, Mielec County in Subcarpathian Voivodeship (south-east Poland)
- Podlesie, Gmina Bogoria in Świętokrzyskie Voivodeship (south-central Poland)
- Podlesie, Gmina Oleśnica in Świętokrzyskie Voivodeship (south-east Poland)
- Podlesie, Białobrzegi County in Masovian Voivodeship (east-central Poland)
- Podlesie, Radom County in Masovian Voivodeship (east-central Poland)
- Podlesie, Sierpc County in Masovian Voivodeship (north-central Poland)
- Podlesie, Jarocin County in Greater Poland Voivodeship (west-central Poland)
- Podlesie, Koło County in Greater Poland Voivodeship (central Poland)
- Podlesie, Oborniki County in Greater Poland Voivodeship (west-central Poland)
- Podlesie, Słupca County in Greater Poland Voivodeship (west-central Poland)
- Podlesie, Gmina Kamienica Polska in Silesian Voivodeship (south Poland)
- Podlesie, Gmina Lelów in Silesian Voivodeship (south Poland)
- Podlesie, Gliwice County in Silesian Voivodeship (south Poland)
- Podlesie, Lubusz Voivodeship (west Poland)
- Podlesie, Świebodzin County in Lubusz Voivodeship (west Poland)
- Podlesie, Głubczyce County in Opole Voivodeship (south Poland)
- Podlesie, Kędzierzyn-Koźle County in Opole Voivodeship (south Poland)
- Podlesie, Nysa County in Opole Voivodeship (south Poland)
- Podlesie, Pomeranian Voivodeship (north Poland)
- Podlesie, Warmian-Masurian Voivodeship (north Poland)
- Podlesie, Choszczno County in West Pomeranian Voivodeship (north-west Poland)
- Podlesie, Stargard County in West Pomeranian Voivodeship (north-west Poland)
- Podlesie, Wałcz County in West Pomeranian Voivodeship (north-west Poland)
- Podlesie, Katowice, a district of the city of Katowice
