= Wygon, Lubusz Voivodeship =

Wygon
- Settlement
- Location within Poland
- Coordinates: 52°12′12″N 15°37′58″E
- Country: Poland
- Voivodeship: Lubusz
- County: Świebodzin
- Gmina: Świebodzin

Wygon [ˈvɨɡɔn] is a settlement in the administrative district of Gmina Świebodzin, within Świebodzin County, Lubusz Voivodeship, in western Poland.
