= Ługów, Lubusz Voivodeship =

Ługów
- Village
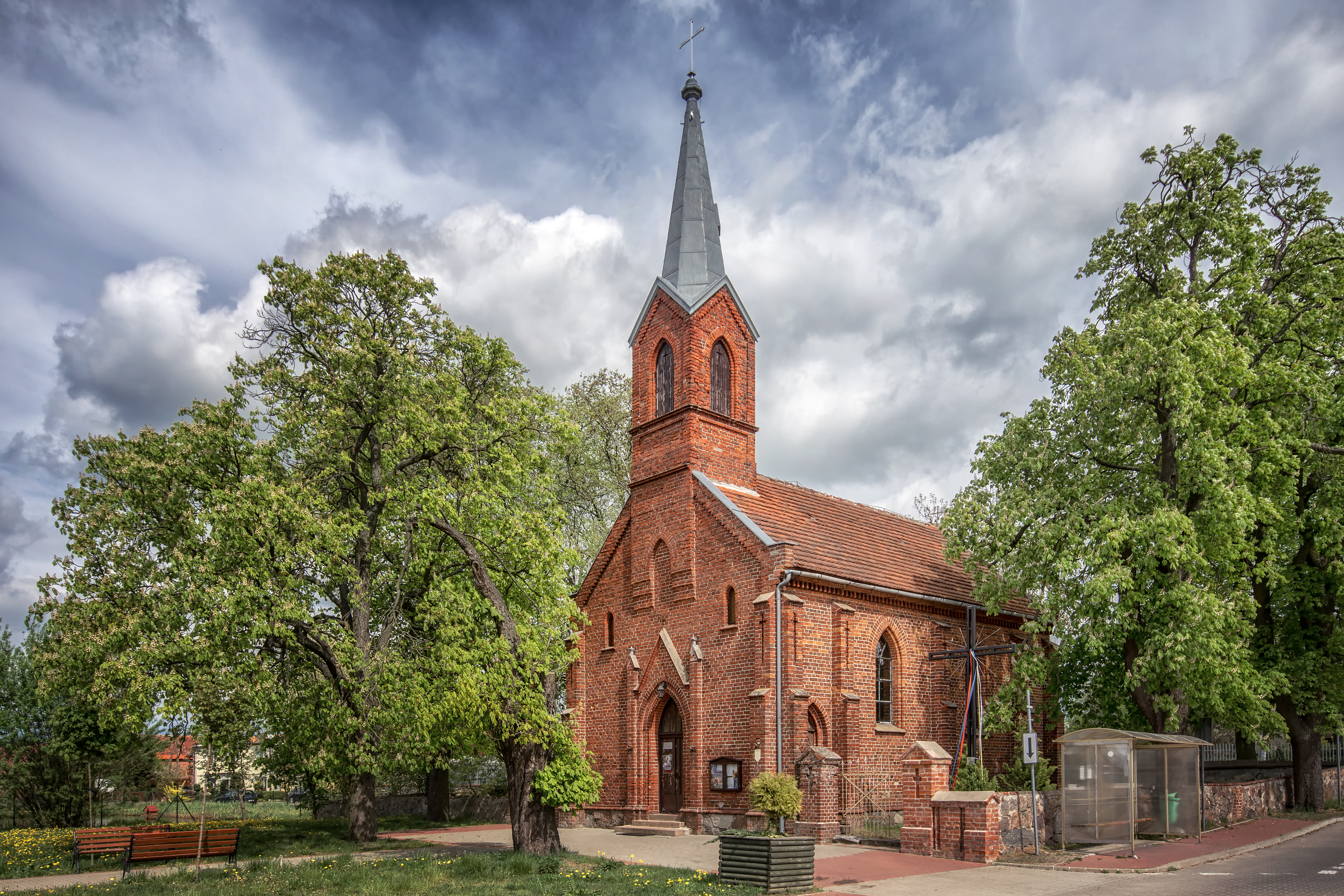
- Church of Saint Elizabeth of Hungary

- Location within Poland
- Coordinates: 52°16′N 15°30′E
- Country: Poland
- Voivodeship: Lubusz
- County: Świebodzin
- Gmina: Świebodzin

Ługów [ˈwuɡuf] is a village in the administrative district of Gmina Świebodzin, within Świebodzin County, Lubusz Voivodeship, in western Poland.
