= Glinsk =

Glinsk may refer to:

== Places ==
=== Ireland ===
- Glinsk, County Mayo, a townland in Kilcommon civil parish in County Mayo
- Glinsk, a 304 m mountain in the foregoing Glinsk townland in County Mayo
- Glinsk, a townland in Aughagower civil parish in County Mayo
- Glinsk, County Galway, a village in Glinsk townland in Ballynakill civil parish in County Galway
- Glinsk, a townland in Ballynakill civil parish in County Galway
- Glinsk, a townland in Moyrus civil parish in County Galway
- Glinsk, a townland in Clondavaddog civil parish in County Donegal
- Castletown and Glinsk, a townland in Kinnitty civil parish in County Offaly

=== Poland ===
- Glińsk, a village in western Poland

=== Ukraine ===
- Glinsk Hermitage, formally known as the Nativity of the Theotokos Male Stavropegial Monastery, a Russian Orthodox monastery
- Hlynsk, Romny Raion, a village in the Romny Raion of Sumy Oblast, called Glinsk in Russian

== See also ==
- Gleensk, a townland in Killinane parish in County Kerry, Ireland
- Glinch, a townland in Aghabog parish in County Monaghan, Ireland
