= Osogóra =

- Village
- Location within Poland
- Coordinates: 52°11′12″N 15°34′42″E
- Country: Poland
- Voivodeship: Lubusz
- County: Świebodzin
- Gmina: Świebodzin
- Population: 40

Osogóra [ɔsɔˈɡura] is a village in the administrative district of Gmina Świebodzin, within Świebodzin County, Lubusz Voivodeship, in western Poland.
