= Kupienino =

- Village
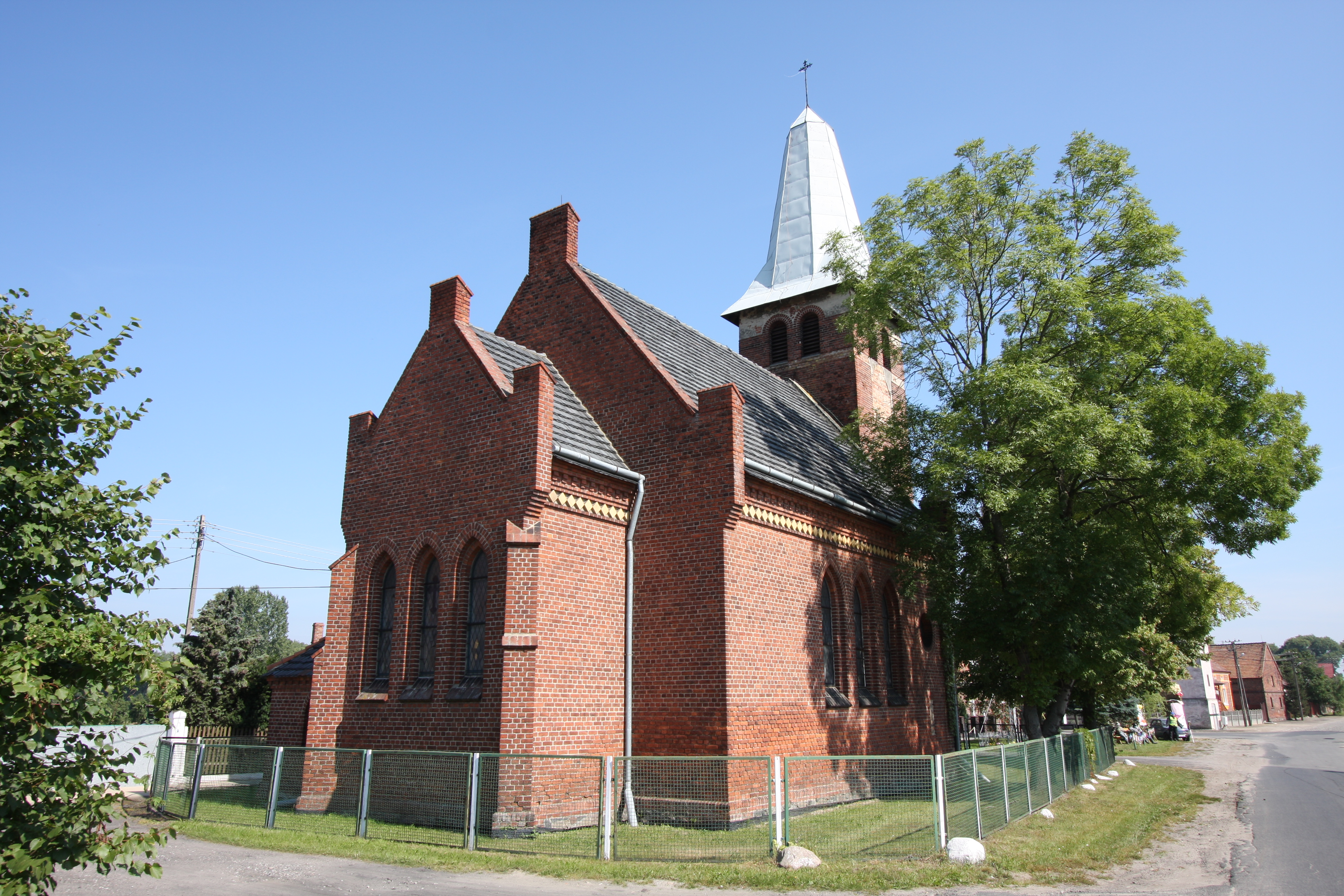

- Location within Poland
- Coordinates: 52°15′26″N 15°36′46″E
- Country: Poland
- Voivodeship: Lubusz
- County: Świebodzin
- Gmina: Świebodzin

Kupienino [kupjɛˈninɔ] is a village in the administrative district of Gmina Świebodzin, within Świebodzin County, Lubusz Voivodeship, in western Poland.
