= Miłkowo, Lubusz Voivodeship =

Miłkowo
- Settlement
- Location within Poland
- Coordinates: 52°10′N 15°37′E
- Country: Poland
- Voivodeship: Lubusz
- County: Świebodzin
- Gmina: Świebodzin

Miłkowo [miu̯ˈkɔvɔ] is a settlement in the administrative district of Gmina Świebodzin, within Świebodzin County, Lubusz Voivodeship, in western Poland.
