= Borów, Lubusz Voivodeship =

Borów
- Village
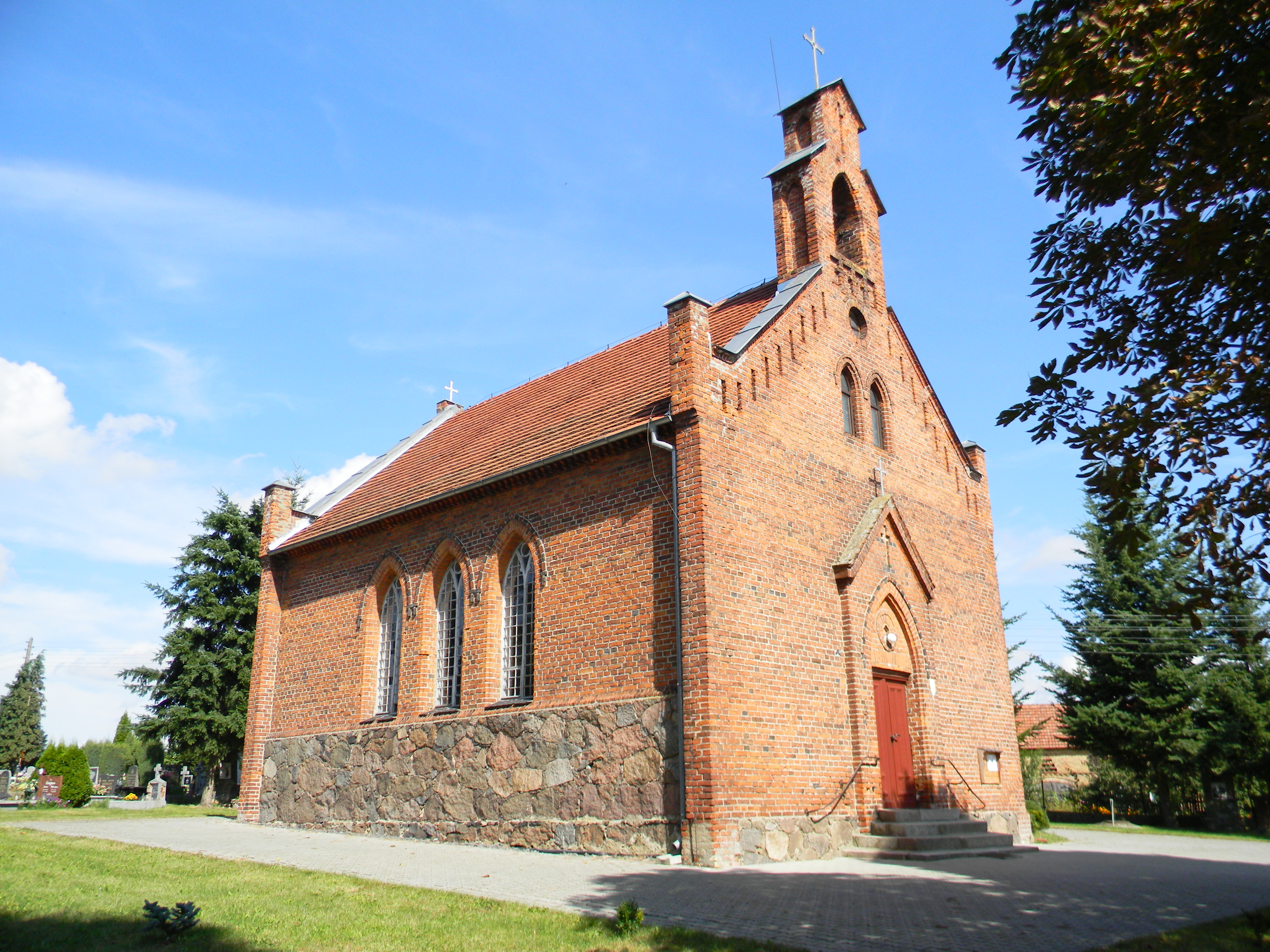
- Catholic church in Borów

- Location within Poland
- Coordinates: 52°13′N 15°26′E
- Country: Poland
- Voivodeship: Lubusz
- County: Świebodzin
- Gmina: Świebodzin

Borów [ˈbɔruf] (formerly German: Birkholz) is a village in the administrative district of Gmina Świebodzin, within Świebodzin County, Lubusz Voivodeship, in western Poland.

== Notable residents ==
- Kurt Student (1890–1978), Luftwaffe general
