= Rudgerzowice =

- Village
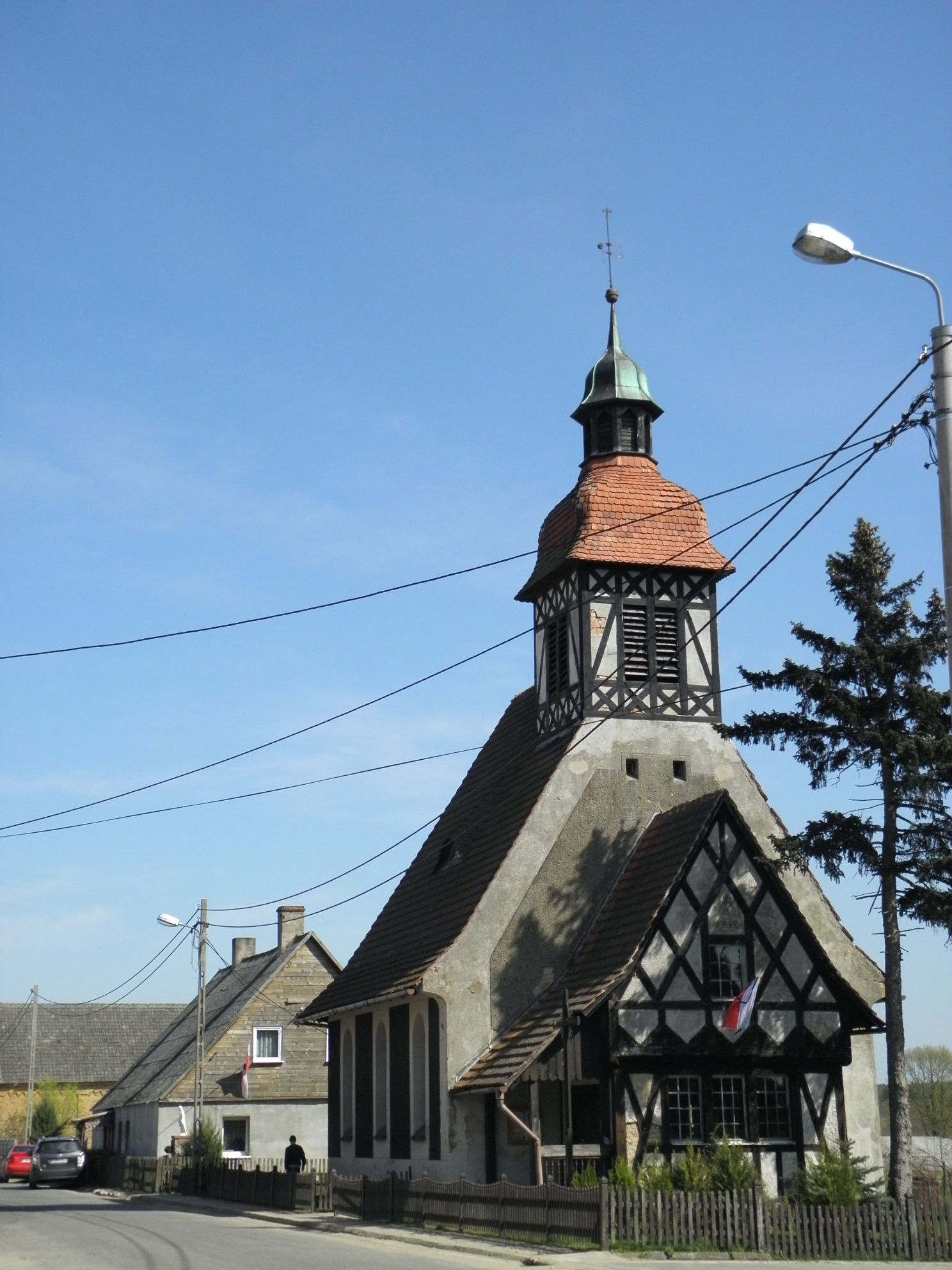
- Church of Our Lady of Perpetual Help

- Location within Poland
- Coordinates: 52°11′N 15°33′E
- Country: Poland
- Voivodeship: Lubusz
- County: Świebodzin
- Gmina: Świebodzin

Rudgerzowice [rudɡɛʐɔˈvit͡sɛ] is a village in the administrative district of Gmina Świebodzin, within Świebodzin County, Lubusz Voivodeship, in western Poland. It is approximately 8 km (5 mi) south of Świebodzin, 28 km (17 mi) north of Zielona Góra, and 65 km (40 mi) south of Gorzów Wielkopolski.
