= Witosław, Lubusz Voivodeship =

Witosław
- Village
- Location within Poland
- Coordinates: 52°17′16″N 15°33′2″E
- Country: Poland
- Voivodeship: Lubusz
- County: Świebodzin
- Gmina: Świebodzin
- Population: 240

Witosław [viˈtɔswaf] is a village in the administrative district of Gmina Świebodzin, within Świebodzin County, Lubusz Voivodeship, in western Poland.
