= Jordanowo, Lubusz Voivodeship =

Jordanowo
- Village
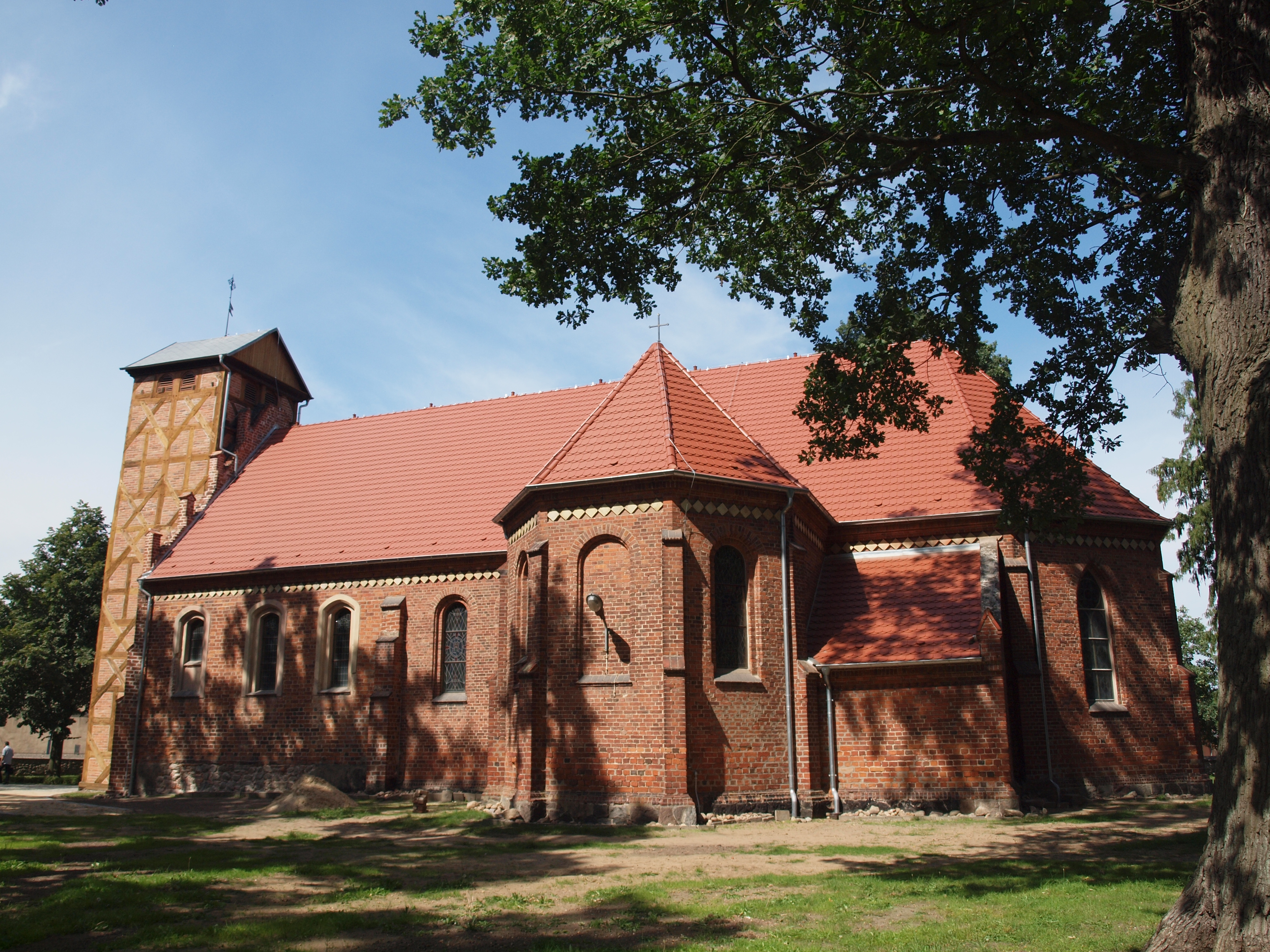
- Church of Saint Anne

- Location within Poland
- Coordinates: 52°20′2″N 15°32′43″E
- Country: Poland
- Voivodeship: Lubusz
- County: Świebodzin
- Gmina: Świebodzin

Population
  - Total: 650
- Time zone: UTC+1 (CET)
  - Summer (DST): UTC+2 (CEST)
- Vehicle registration: FSW

Jordanowo [jɔrdaˈnɔvɔ] is a village in the administrative district of Gmina Świebodzin, within Świebodzin County, Lubusz Voivodeship, in western Poland.

Jordanowo, formerly also known as Jordan, was a private church village, administratively located in the Poznań County in the Poznań Voivodeship in the Greater Poland Province of the Kingdom of Poland.
