= Rzeczyca, Świebodzin County =

Rzeczyca
- Village
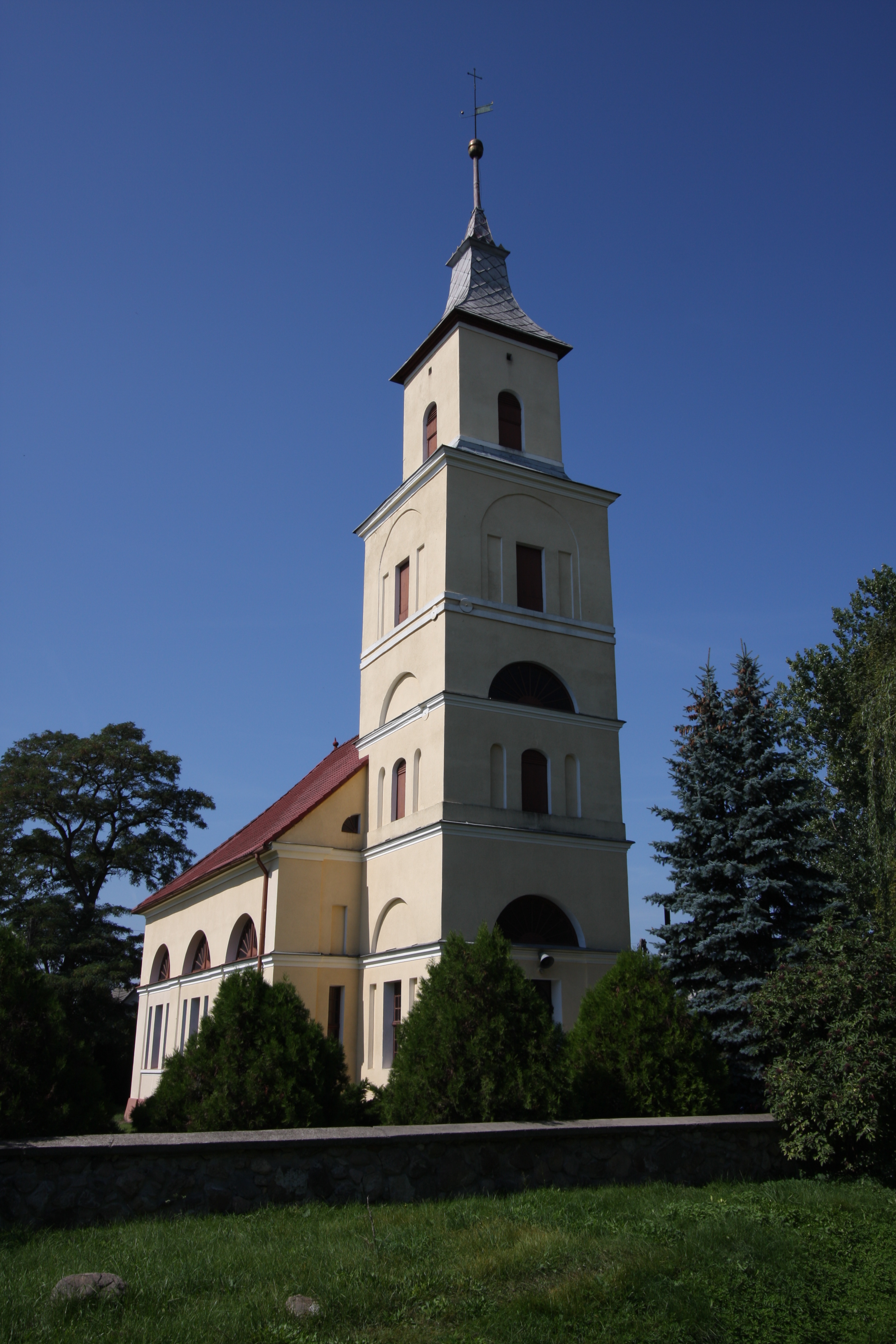
- Catholic church

- Location within Poland
- Coordinates: 52°16′32″N 15°36′19″E
- Country: Poland
- Voivodeship: Lubusz
- County: Świebodzin
- Gmina: Świebodzin
- Population: 490

Rzeczyca ([ʐɛˈt͡ʂɨt͡sa]; German: Rietschütz) is a village in the administrative district of Gmina Świebodzin, within Świebodzin County, Lubusz Voivodeship, in western Poland.
