= Gościkowo =

- Village
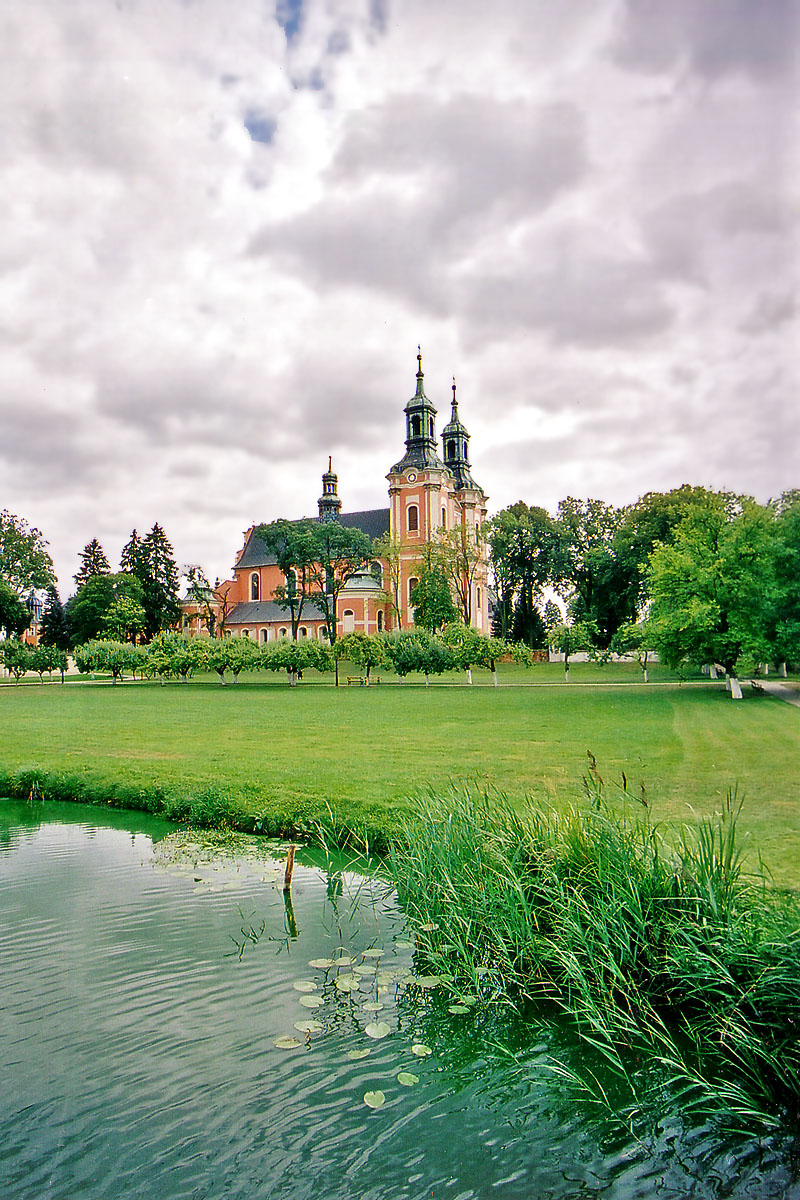
- Gościkowo-Paradyż Abbey

- Location within Poland
- Coordinates: 52°20′N 15°32′E
- Country: Poland
- Voivodeship: Lubusz
- County: Świebodzin
- Gmina: Świebodzin

Population
  - Total: 380
- Time zone: UTC+1 (CET)
  - Summer (DST): UTC+2 (CEST)
- Vehicle registration: FSW

Gościkowo (Polish: [ɡɔɕt͡ɕiˈkɔvɔ]), formerly Paradyż, is a village in the administrative district of Gmina Świebodzin, within Świebodzin County, Lubusz Voivodeship, in western Poland. It is situated on the Paklica River.

The former Cistercian abbey now serves as a theological seminary, and is listed as a Historic Monument of Poland.

== History ==
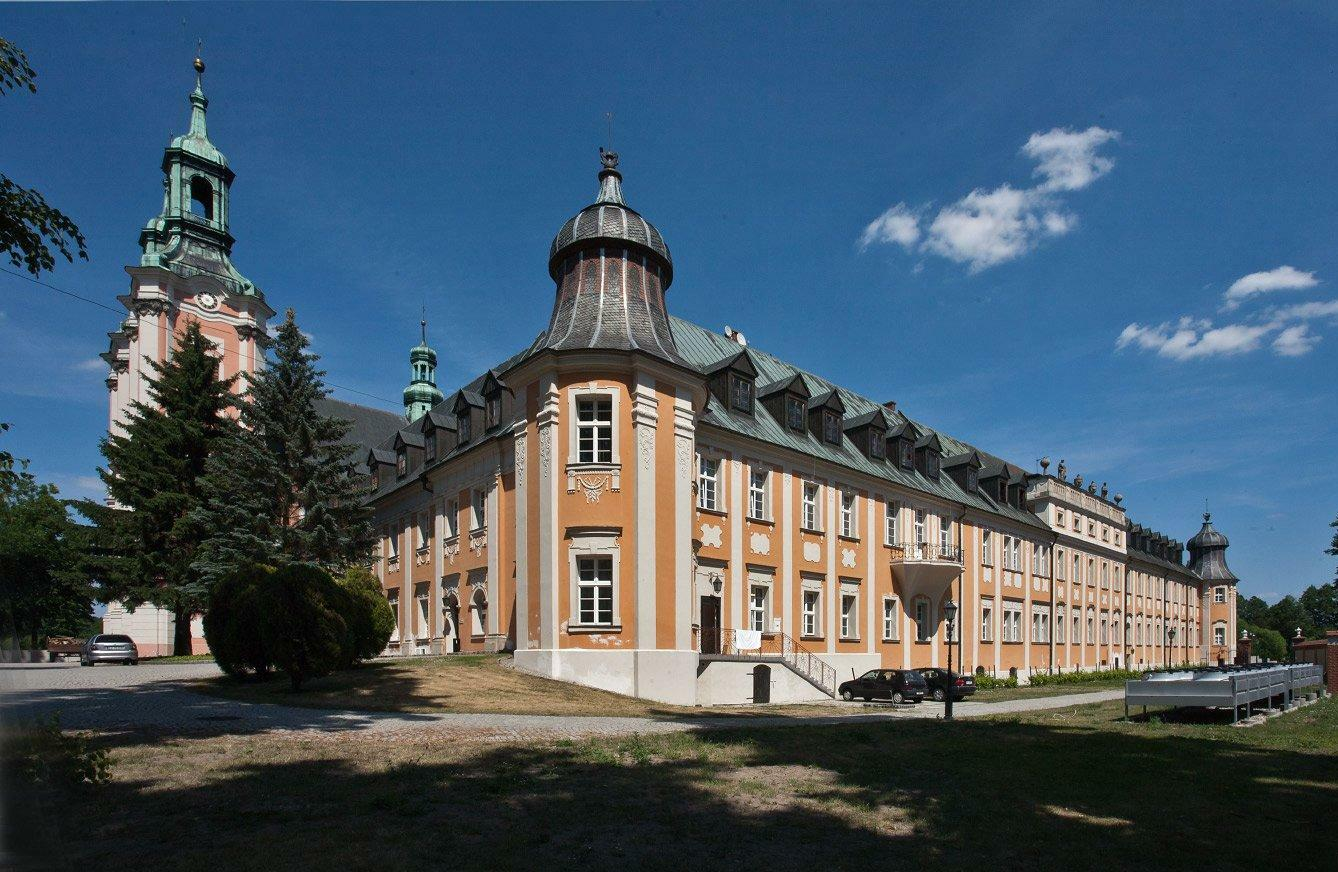
Gościkowo-Paradyż Abbey

In the 13th century, the village was known as Gościchowo which is the source of the modern name. The first wooden church was built in the village before 1230. In 1230 Mikołaj Bronisz of Wieniawa coat of arms granted the area to the Cistercians who gave it the Latin name Paradius Matris Dei, from which Paradyż and Paradies were derived. The grant was confirmed by Polish monarch Henry the Bearded in 1234 in Środa Śląska, and by Duke Władysław Odonic in 1236. In 1235, the monks obtained the patronage of Duke Władysław Odonic. In 1245 Duke Bolesław the Pious, son of Władysław Odonic, assumed the patronage over the monastery, exempted it from state taxes and granted privileges. The privileges were then confirmed by Przemysł I in 1276, Louis I in 1380, Władysław II Jagiełło in 1426, Sigismund I the Old in 1513. In 1546, the abbot was kidnapped by the Brandenburgers on his way back from Lubrza and imprisoned near Cottbus (Chóśebuz) for several weeks.
