= Podjezierze =

- Settlement
- Location within Poland
- Coordinates: 52°14′33″N 15°28′20″E
- Country: Poland
- Voivodeship: Lubusz
- County: Świebodzin
- Gmina: Świebodzin

Podjezierze [pɔdjɛˈʑɛʐɛ] is a settlement in the administrative district of Gmina Świebodzin, within Świebodzin County, Lubusz Voivodeship, in western Poland.
