= Jeziory, Lubusz Voivodeship =

Jeziory
- Village
- Location within Poland
- Coordinates: 52°13′N 15°36′E
- Country: Poland
- Voivodeship: Lubusz
- County: Świebodzin
- Gmina: Świebodzin

Jeziory [jɛˈʑɔrɨ] is a village in the administrative district of Gmina Świebodzin, within Świebodzin County, Lubusz Voivodeship, in western Poland.
