= Grodziszcze, Świebodzin County =

Grodziszcze
- Village
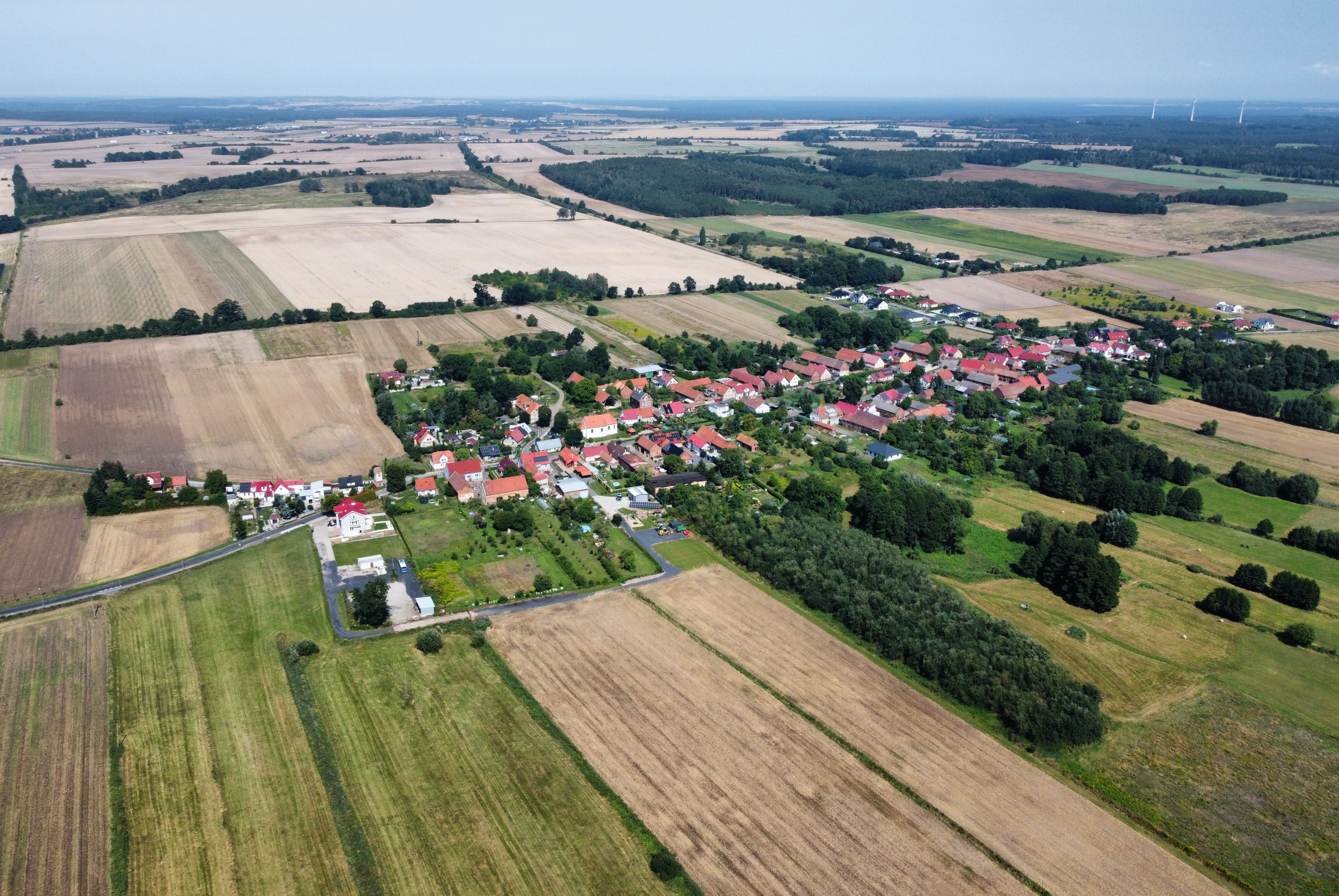

- Location within Poland
- Coordinates: 52°15′N 15°34′E
- Country: Poland
- Voivodeship: Lubusz
- County: Świebodzin
- Gmina: Świebodzin
- Elevation: 94 m (308 ft)

Grodziszcze [ɡrɔˈd͡ʑiʂt͡ʂɛ] is a village in the administrative district of Gmina Świebodzin, within Świebodzin County, Lubusz Voivodeship, in western Poland.
