= Wityń =

- Village
- Location within Poland
- Coordinates: 52°16′12″N 15°36′30″E
- Country: Poland
- Voivodeship: Lubusz
- County: Świebodzin
- Gmina: Świebodzin
- Population: 40

Wityń [ˈvitɨɲ] is a village in the administrative district of Gmina Świebodzin, within Świebodzin County, Lubusz Voivodeship, in western Poland.
