= Rosin, Poland =

Rosin
- Village
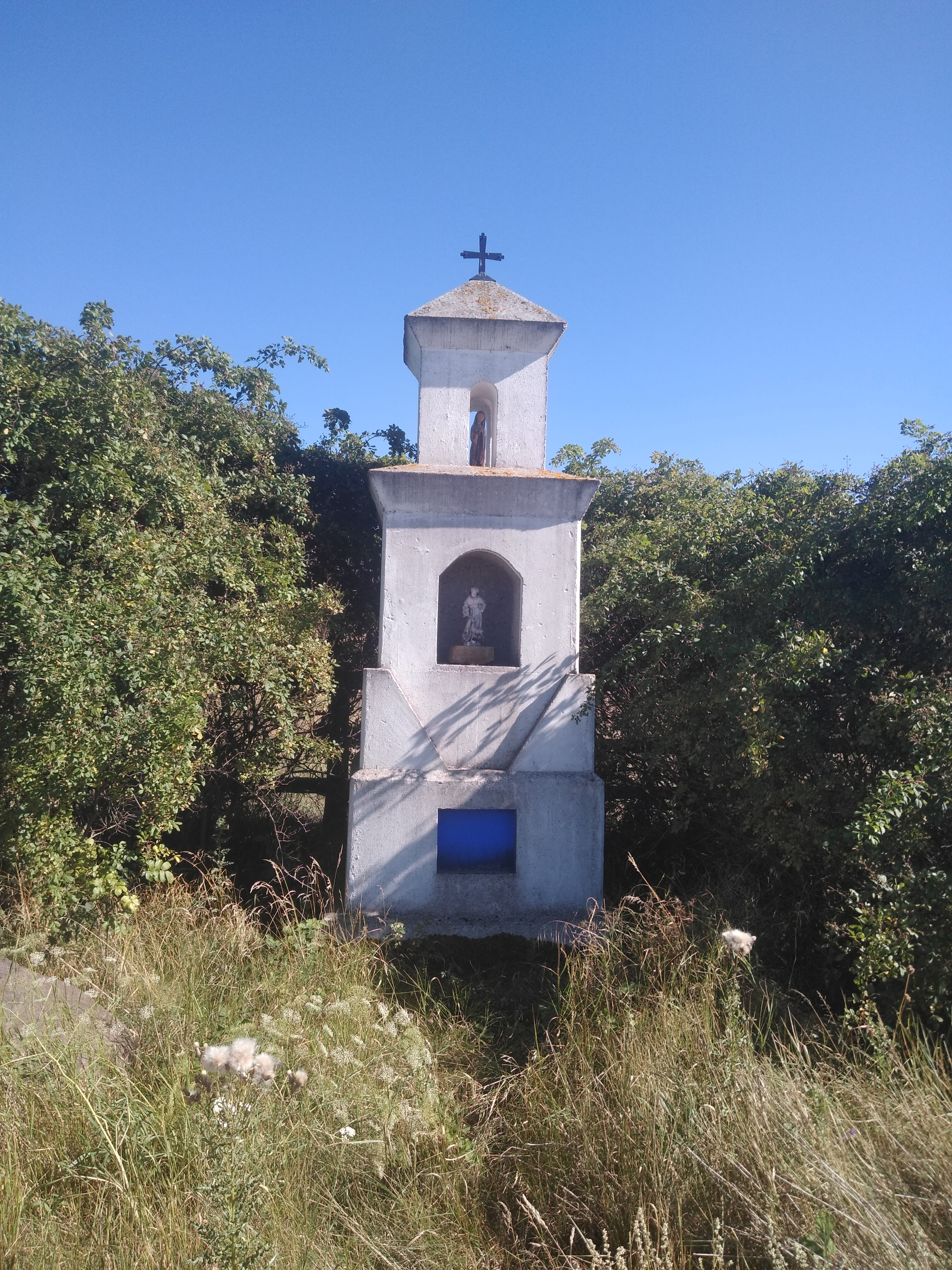
- Shrine

- Location within Poland
- Coordinates: 52°10′N 15°34′E
- Country: Poland
- Voivodeship: Lubusz
- County: Świebodzin
- Gmina: Świebodzin

Rosin [ˈrɔɕin] is a village in the administrative district of Gmina Świebodzin, within Świebodzin County, Lubusz Voivodeship, in western Poland. The estimated population of Rosin, Poland is 281.
