= Rusinów, Lubusz Voivodeship =

Rusinów
- Village
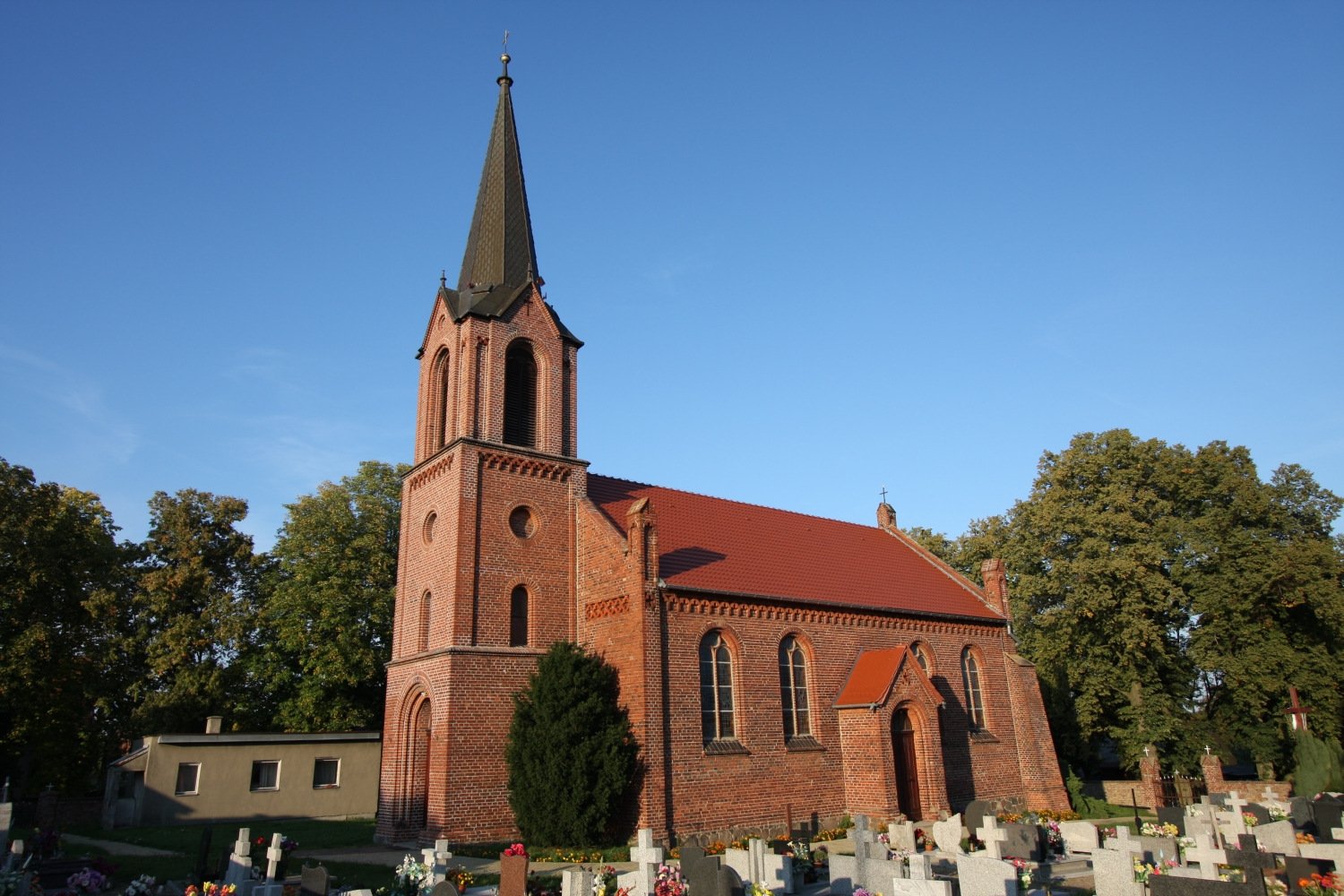
- Church of Saint Lawrence

- Location within Poland
- Coordinates: 52°17′N 15°31′E
- Country: Poland
- Voivodeship: Lubusz
- County: Świebodzin
- Gmina: Świebodzin

Rusinów [ruˈɕinuf] is a village in the administrative district of Gmina Świebodzin, within Świebodzin County, Lubusz Voivodeship, in western Poland.
