= Lubinicko =

- Village
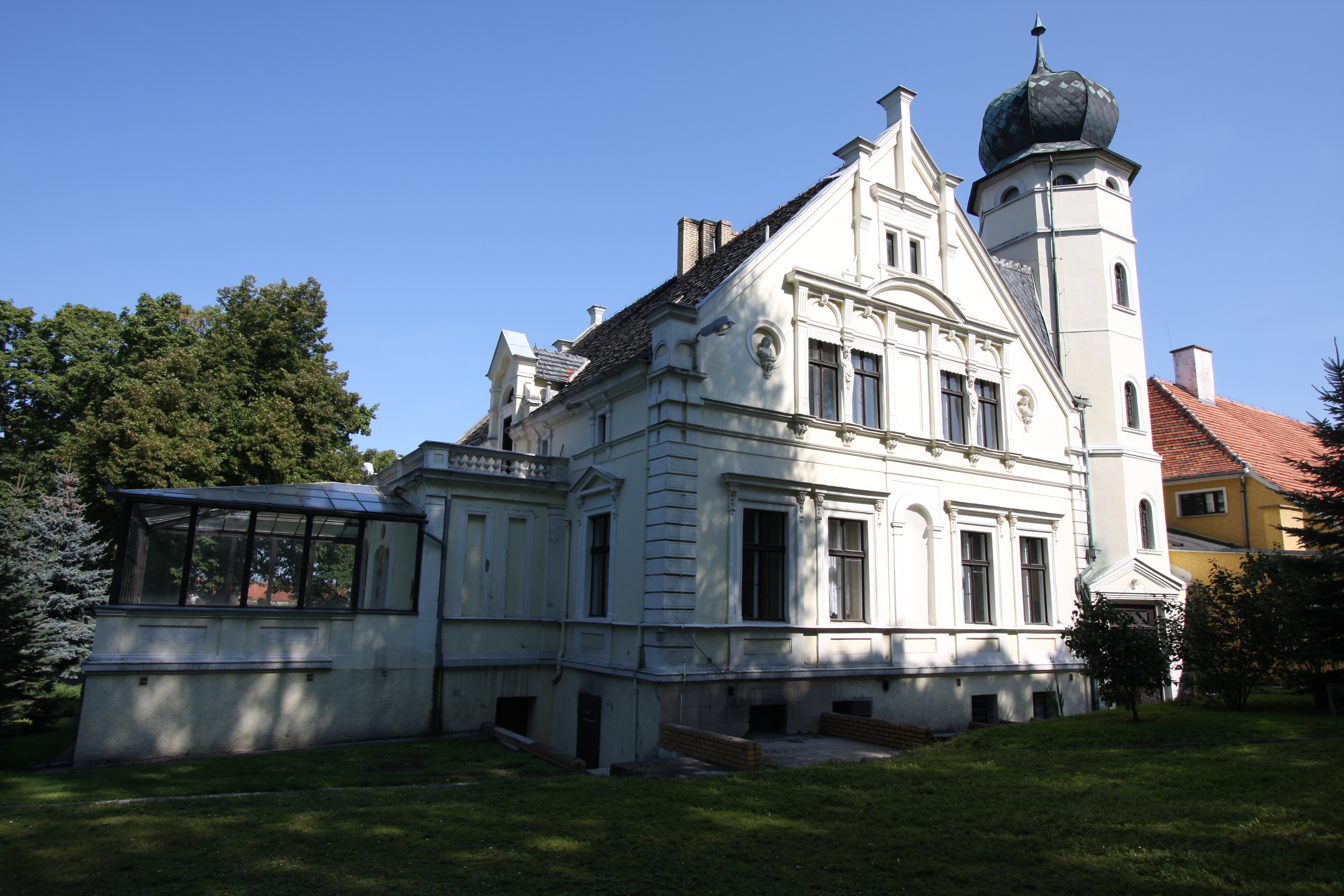
- Palace

- Location within Poland
- Coordinates: 52°14′N 15°34′E
- Country: Poland
- Voivodeship: Lubusz
- County: Świebodzin
- Gmina: Świebodzin

Lubinicko [lubiˈnit͡skɔ] is a village in the administrative district of Gmina Świebodzin, within Świebodzin County, Lubusz Voivodeship, in western Poland.
