= Lubogóra =

- Village
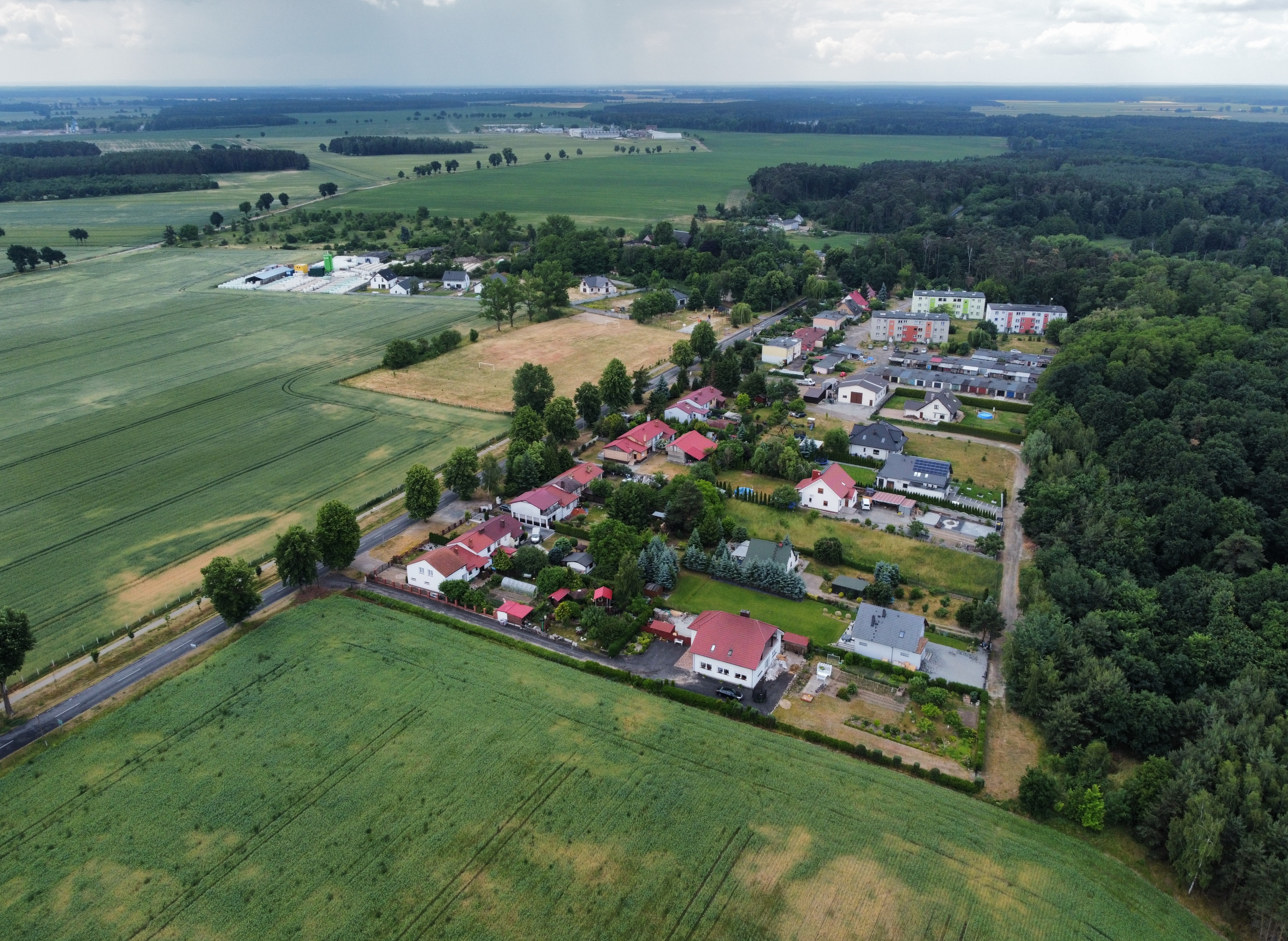

- Location within Poland
- Coordinates: 52°13′23″N 15°29′14″E
- Country: Poland
- Voivodeship: Lubusz
- County: Świebodzin
- Gmina: Świebodzin

Lubogóra [lubɔˈɡura] is a village in the administrative district of Gmina Świebodzin, within Świebodzin County, Lubusz Voivodeship, in western Poland.
