= Niedźwiady, Lubusz Voivodeship =

Niedźwiady
- Settlement
- Location within Poland
- Coordinates: 52°12′31″N 15°28′50″E
- Country: Poland
- Voivodeship: Lubusz
- County: Świebodzin
- Gmina: Świebodzin

Niedźwiady [ɲɛd͡ʑˈvjadɨ] is a settlement in the administrative district of Gmina Świebodzin, within Świebodzin County, Lubusz Voivodeship, in western Poland.
