= Kępsko, Lubusz Voivodeship =

Kępsko
- Village
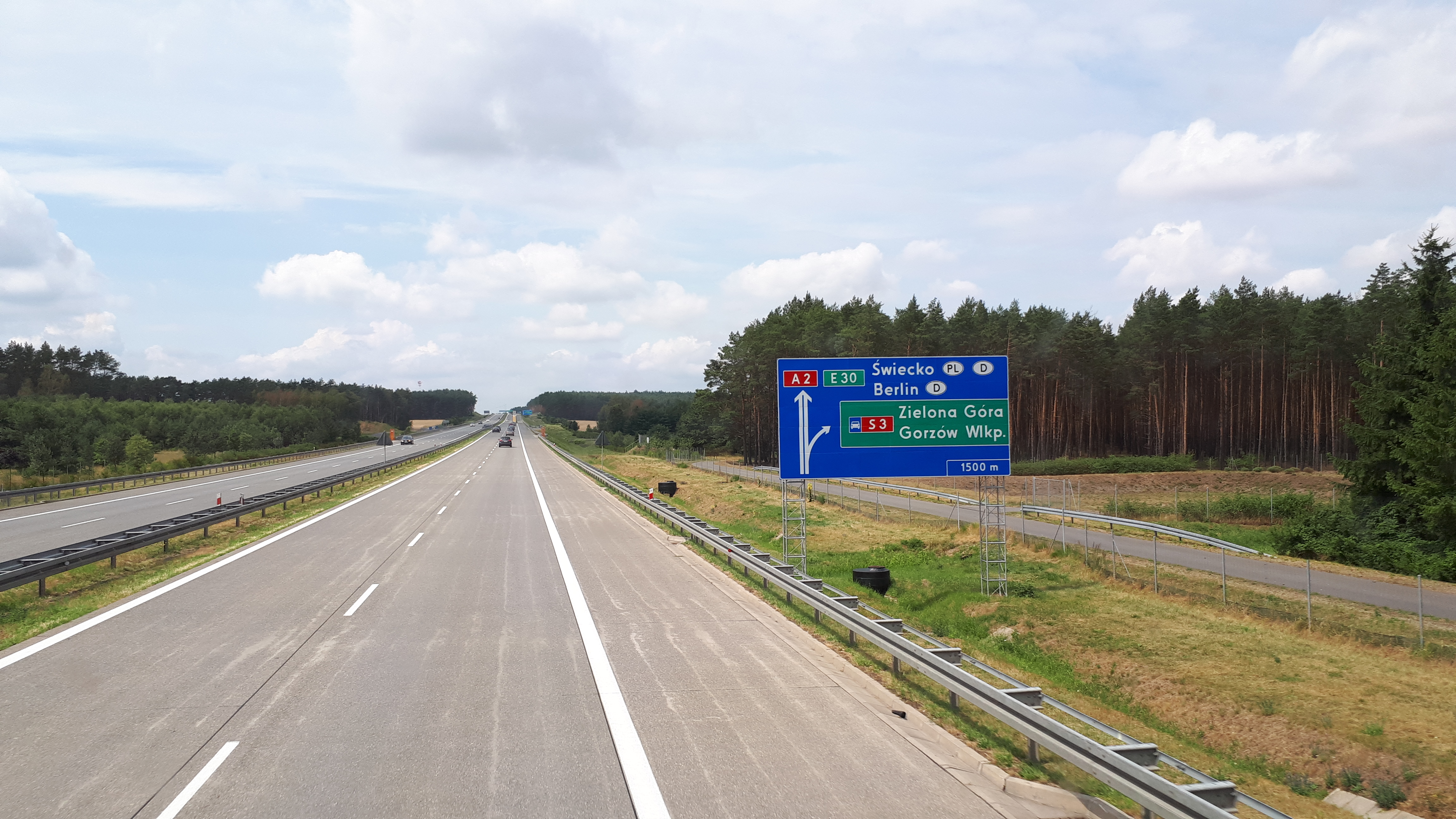
- Junction turning point to Kępsko on the European route E65.

- Location within Poland
- Coordinates: 52°08′38″N 15°33′55″E
- Country: Poland
- Voivodeship: Lubusz
- County: Świebodzin
- Gmina: Świebodzin

Kępsko [ˈkɛmpskɔ] is a village in the administrative district of Gmina Świebodzin, within Świebodzin County, Lubusz Voivodeship, in western Poland.

== History ==
The first mention of the village comes from 1320 and mentions the donation of the village of Schonenburn by the knight Dragonus to the Cistercians from Paradyż. The grant was confirmed by the Duke of Głogów, Henry IV the Faithful. In the following centuries, the Cistercians sold the town to the von Schlichting family. During the Seven Years' War, the Russians burned most of the wooden buildings in the village, and from then on, the economically weakened estate passed from one owner to another. From 1840, Kępsko belonged to the Schulz family, which led to the reconstruction and development of the estate.

== Gallery ==
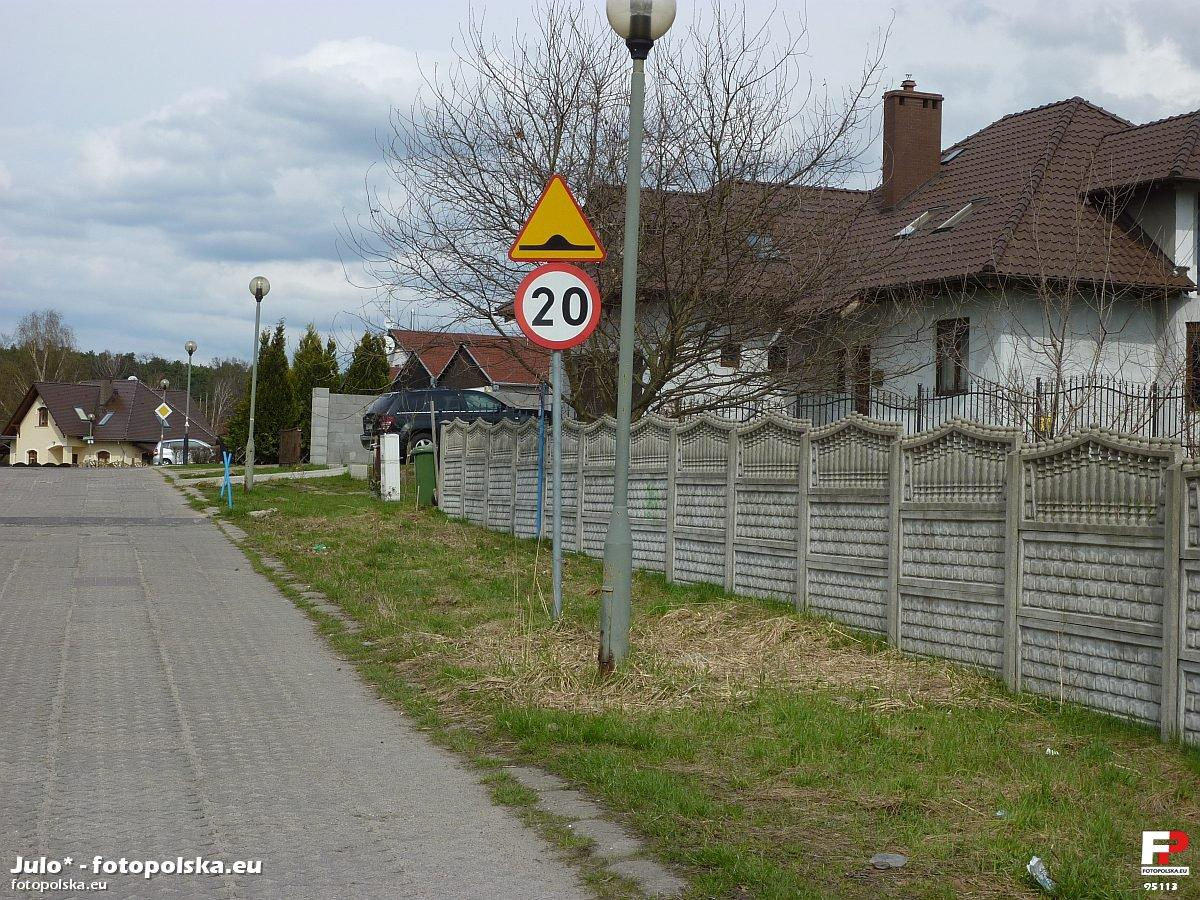

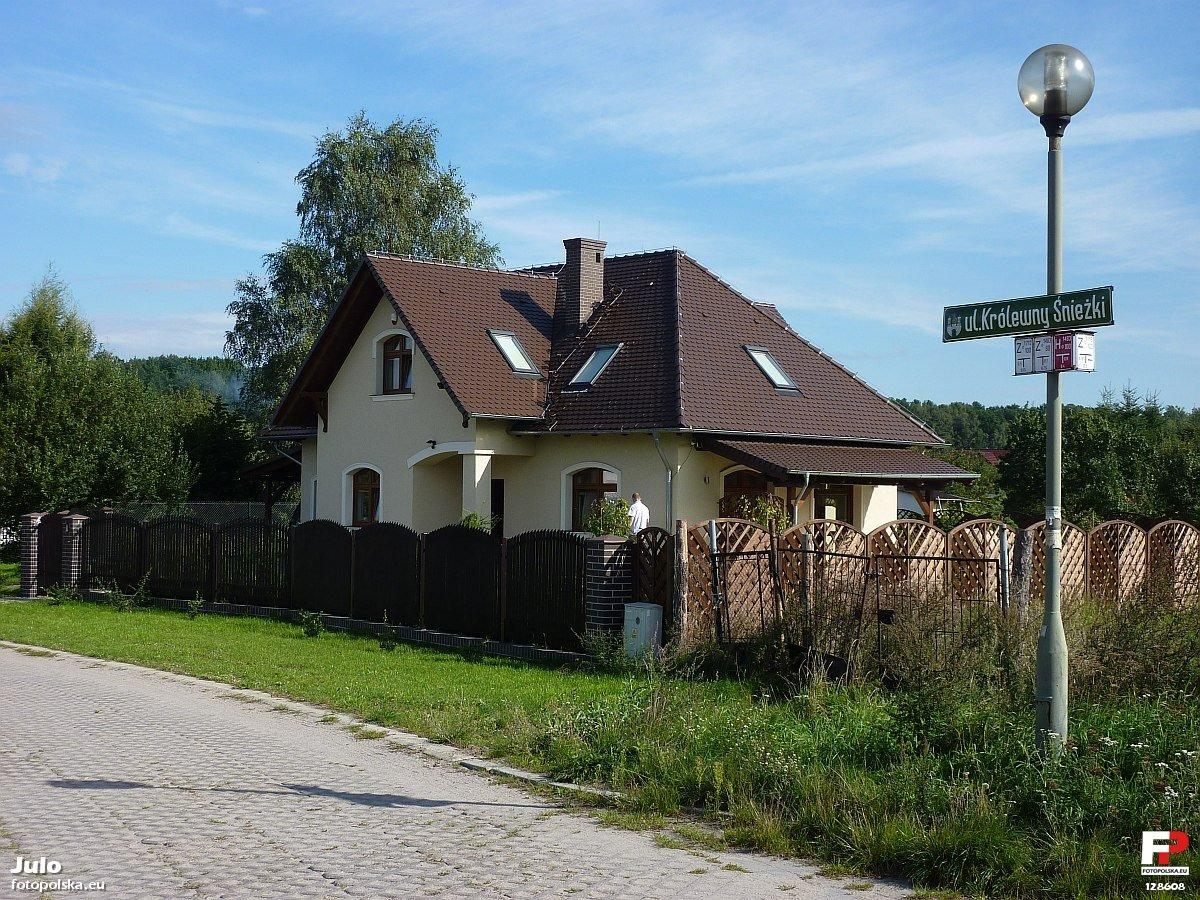

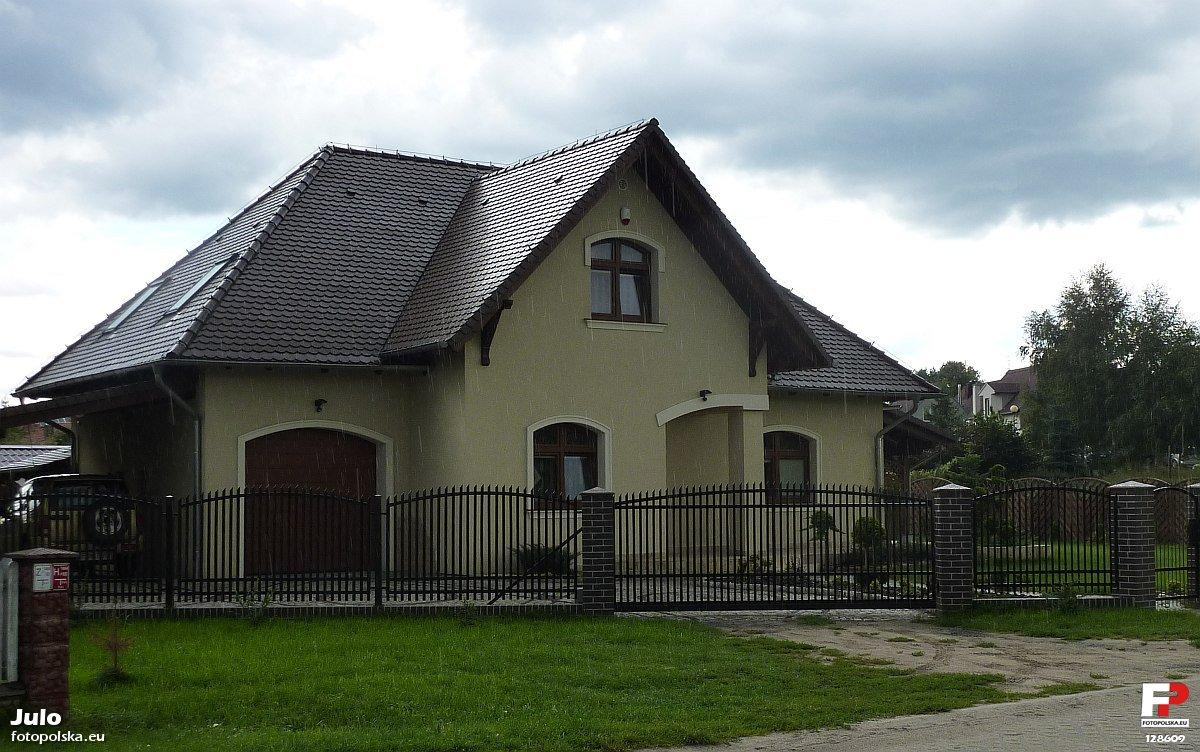

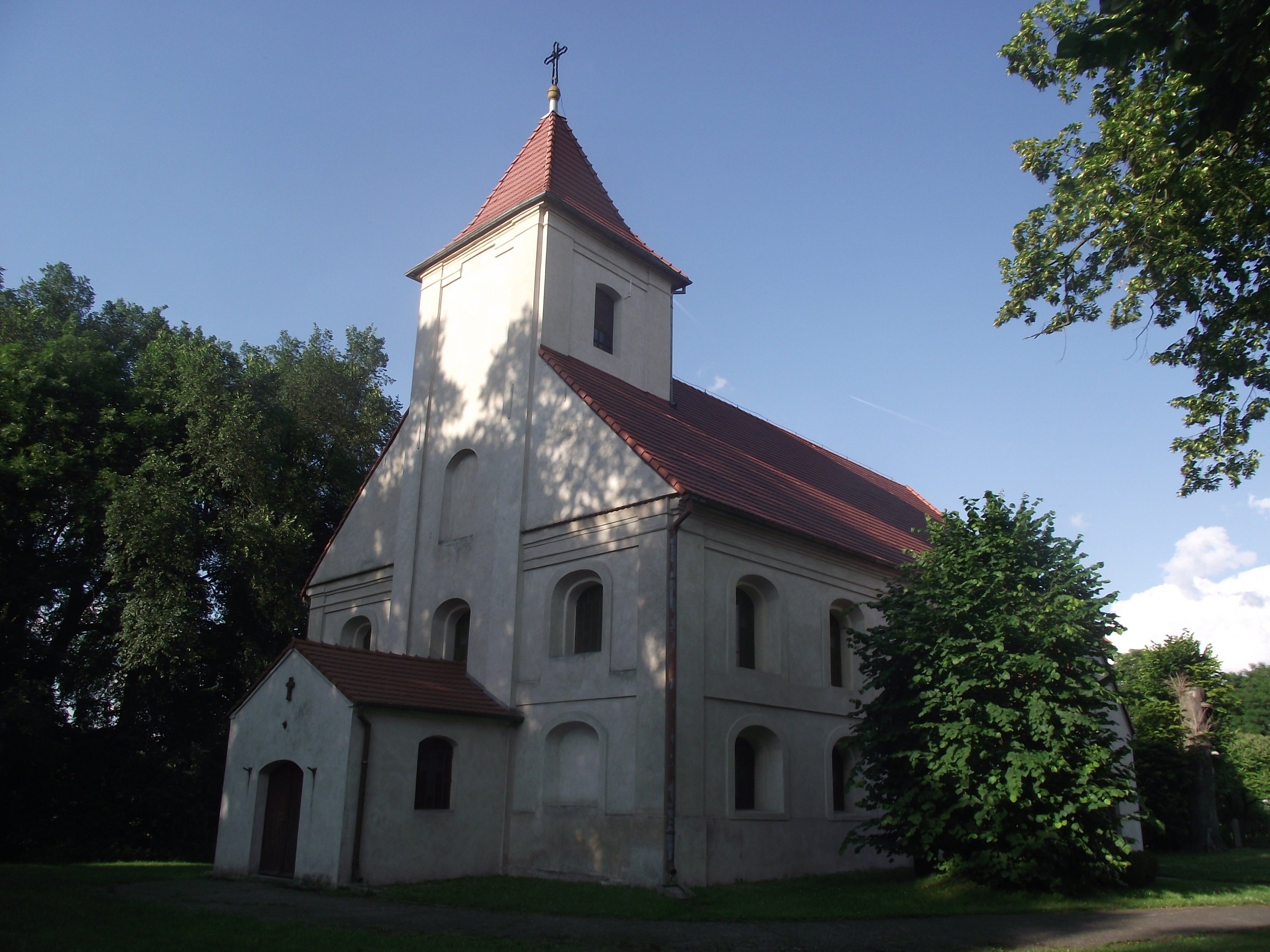
Immaculate Heart of Mary church in Kępsko

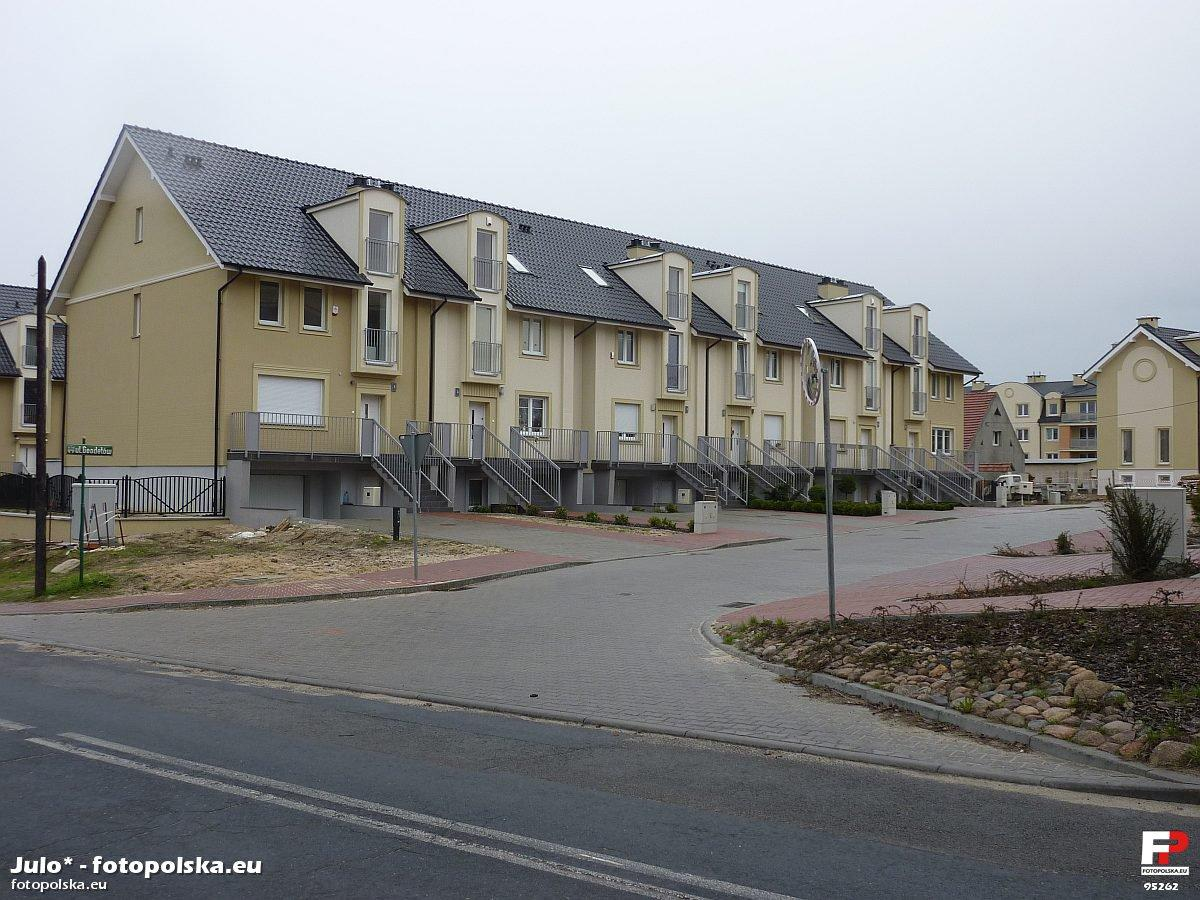

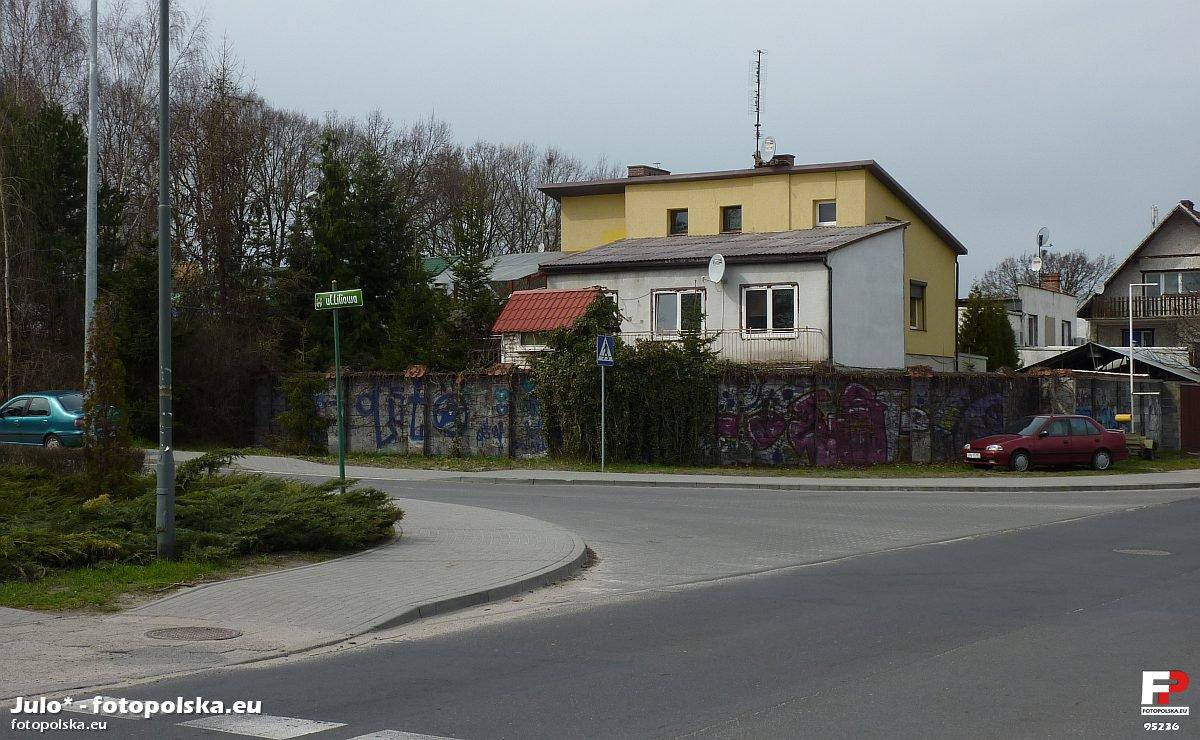

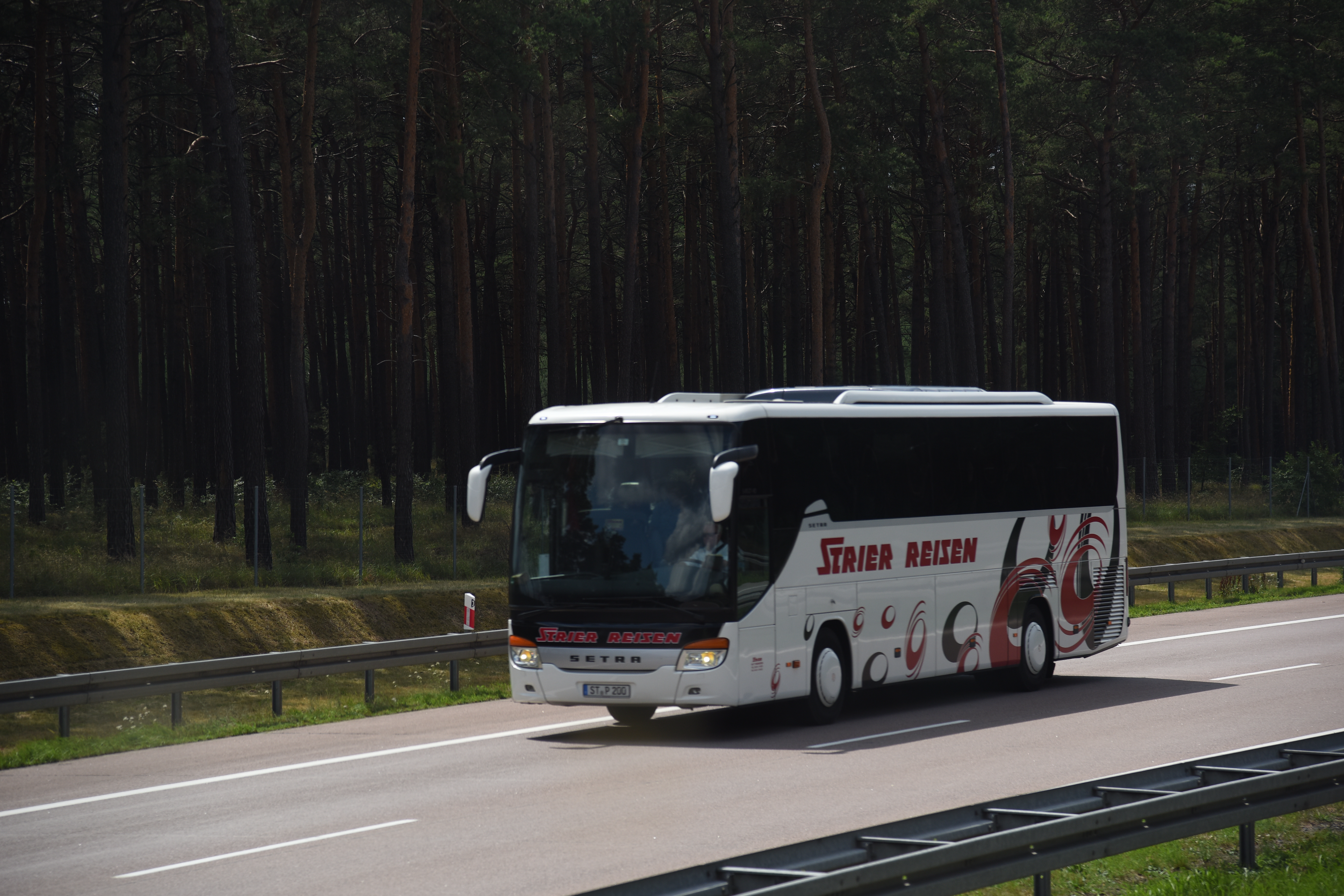

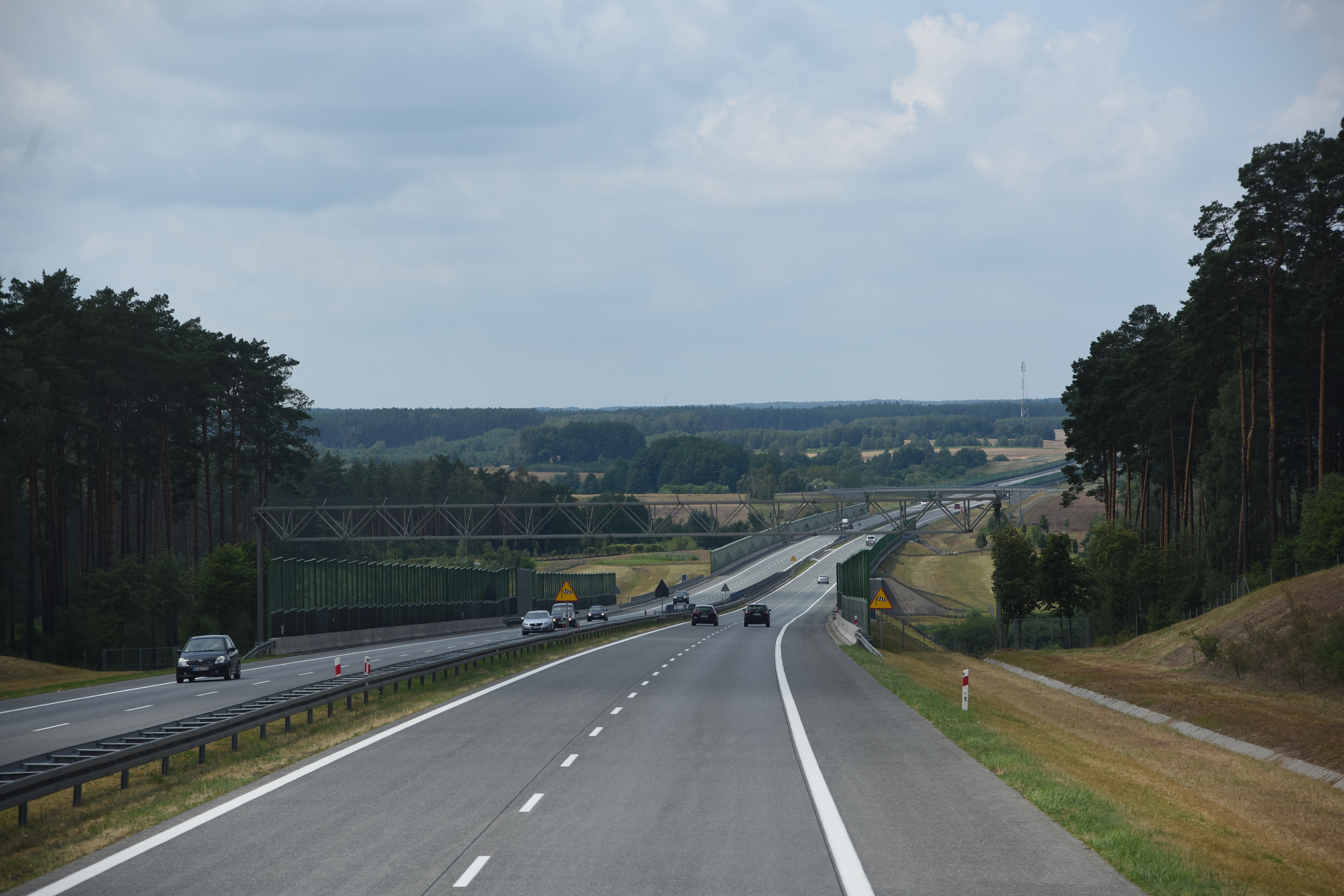
