= Nowy Dworek, Lubusz Voivodeship =

Nowy Dworek
- Village
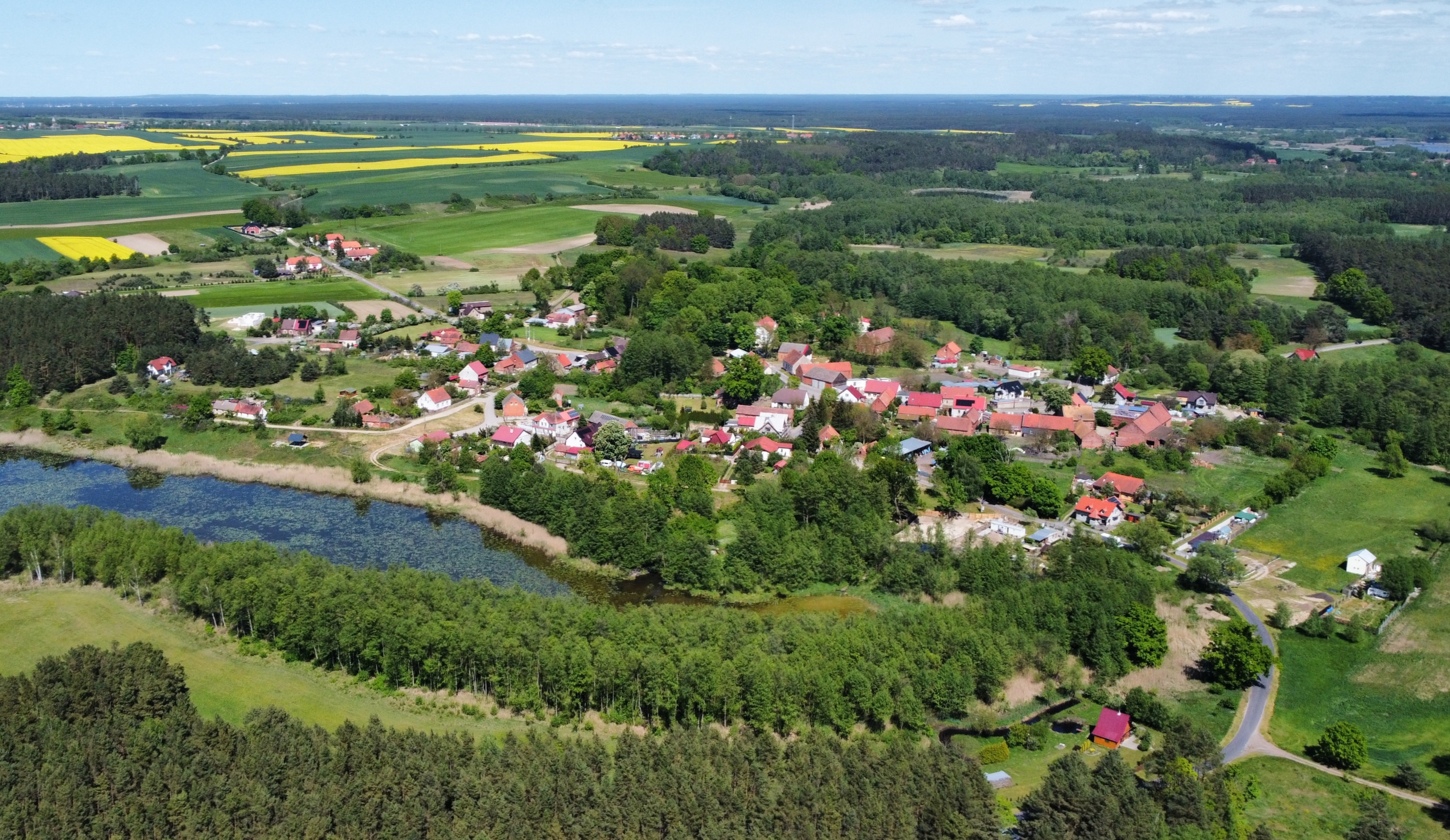
- Aerial view of Nowy Dworek

- Location within Poland
- Coordinates: 52°20′N 15°31′E
- Country: Poland
- Voivodeship: Lubusz
- County: Świebodzin
- Gmina: Świebodzin
- Time zone: UTC+1 (CET)
  - Summer (DST): UTC+2 (CEST)
- Vehicle registration: FSW

Nowy Dworek [ˈnɔvɨ ˈdvɔrɛk] is a village in the administrative district of Gmina Świebodzin, within Świebodzin County, Lubusz Voivodeship, in western Poland.

Nowy Dworek, formerly also known as Nowy Dwór, was a private church village, administratively located in the Poznań County in the Poznań Voivodeship in the Greater Poland Province of the Kingdom of Poland.
