= Raków, Lubusz Voivodeship =

Raków
- Village
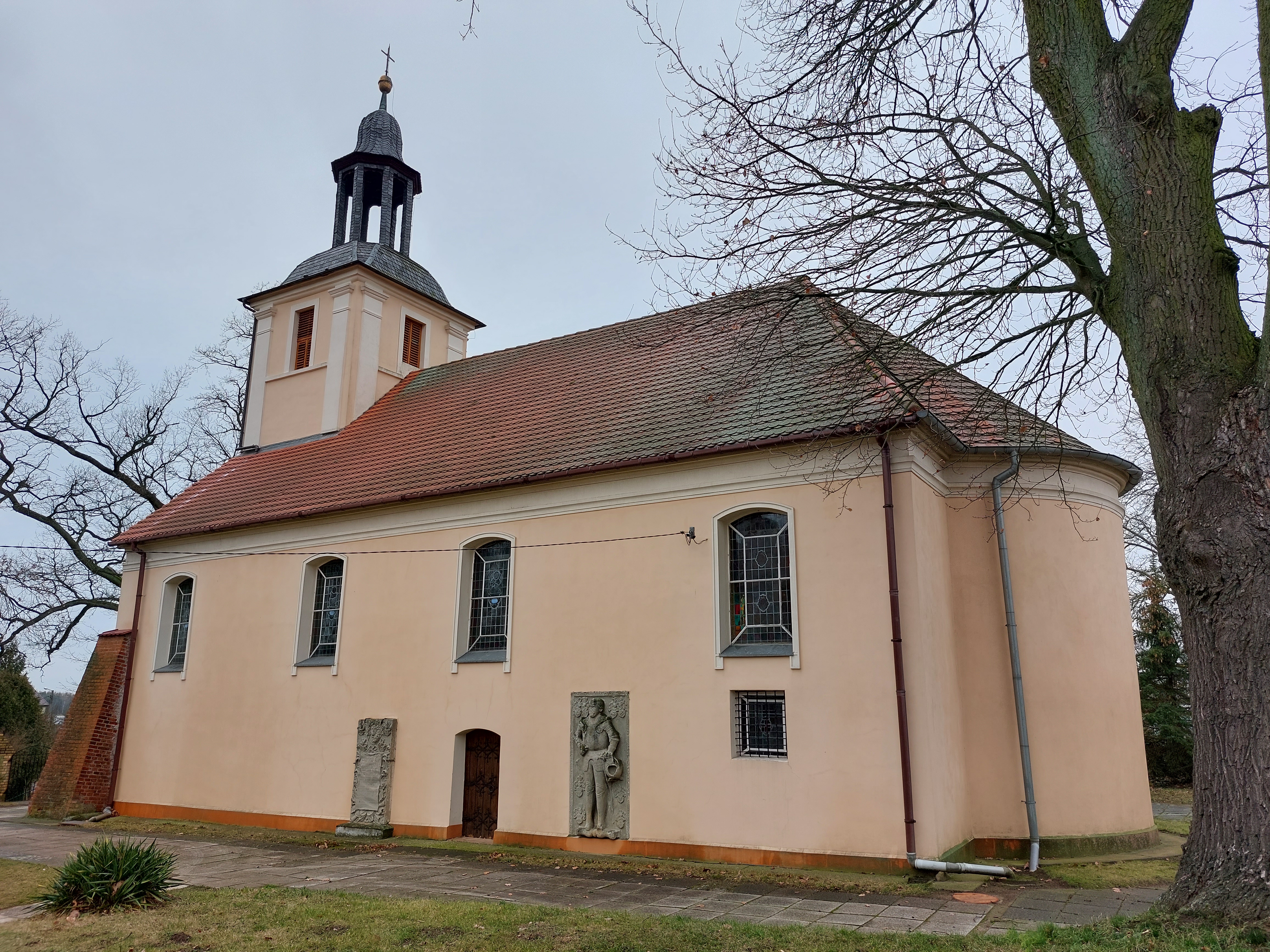
- Baroque Saint Jadwiga church

- Location within Poland
- Coordinates: 52°11′N 15°36′E
- Country: Poland
- Voivodeship: Lubusz
- County: Świebodzin
- Gmina: Świebodzin
- Time zone: UTC+1 (CET)
  - Summer (DST): UTC+2 (CEST)
- Vehicle registration: FSW

Raków [ˈrakuf] is a village in the administrative district of Gmina Świebodzin, within Świebodzin County, Lubusz Voivodeship, in western Poland.

The S3 highway passes near Raków, west of the village.
