= Glińsk =

- Village
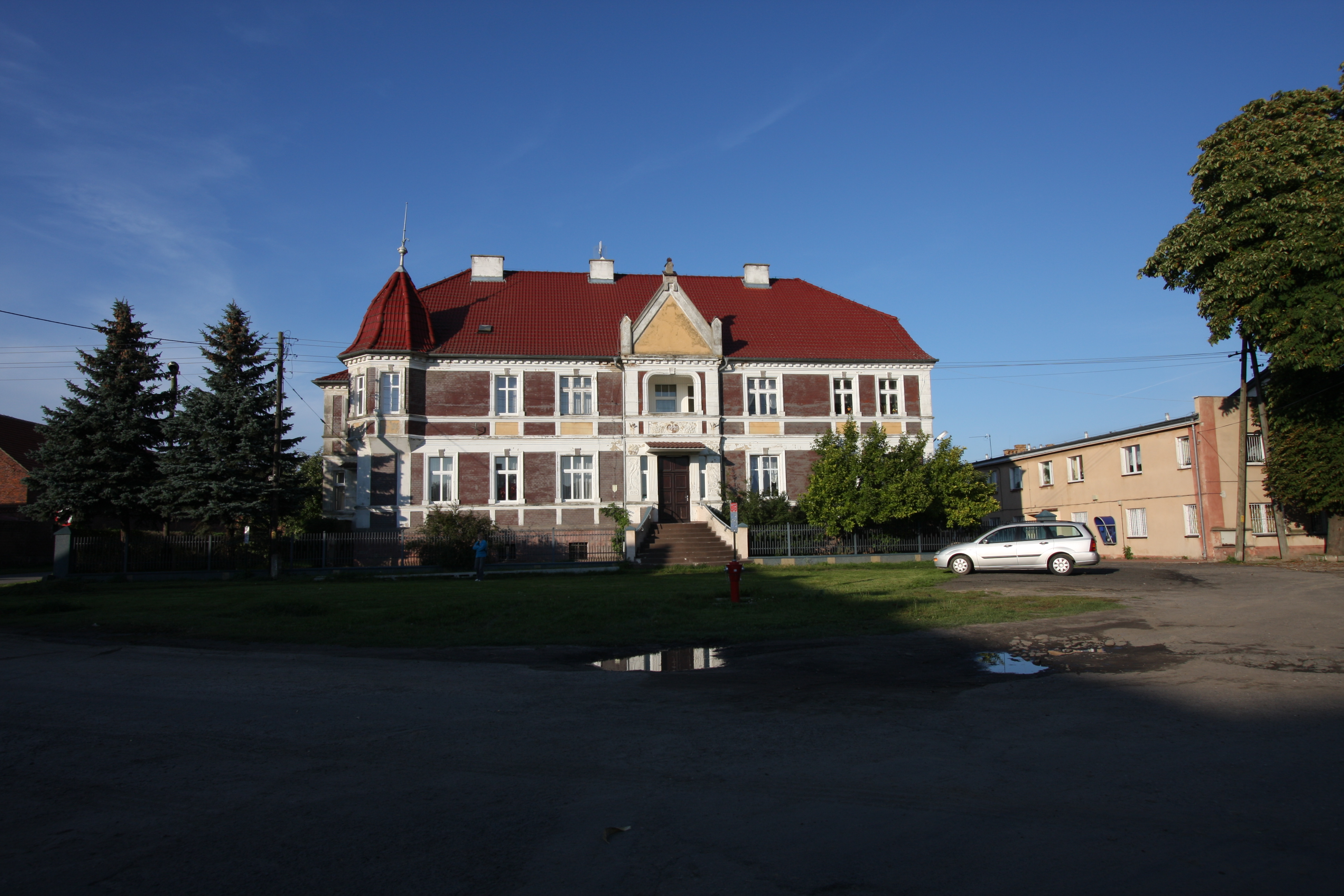

- Location within Poland
- Coordinates: 52°18′N 15°33′E
- Country: Poland
- Voivodeship: Lubusz
- County: Świebodzin
- Gmina: Świebodzin
- Time zone: UTC+1 (CET)
  - Summer (DST): UTC+2 (CEST)
- Vehicle registration: FSW

Glińsk [ɡliɲsk] is a village in the administrative district of Gmina Świebodzin, within Świebodzin County, Lubusz Voivodeship, in western Poland.

During World War II, in 1940−1943, Nazi Germany operated a forced labour camp for Jewish men in the village.
