= Krzemionka (tributary of Dukiełka) =

Location
- Country: Poland
- Voivodeship: Subcarpathian Voivodeship
- County: Krosno County
- Municipality: Gmina Dukla
- Places: Teodorówka, Iwla

Physical characteristics
- Source
  - location: Chyrowa, Beskid Dukielski, Low Beskids
  - coordinates: 49°32′7.62″N 21°38′39.59″E
  - elevation: 600 m (2,000 ft)
- Mouth
  - location: Dukiełka in Teodorówka
  - coordinates: 49°33′5.726″N 21°39′11.32″E
  - elevation: 374 m (1,227 ft)
- Length: 2.6 km (1.6 mi)
- Width
  - maximum: 1.5 m (4 ft 11 in)

Basin features
- Progression: Dukiełka→ Jasiołka→ Wisłoka→ Vistula→ Baltic Sea

Krzemionka (also known as Kaletowski) is a stream in south-eastern Poland, located in the Subcarpathian Voivodeship, Krosno County, within the Dukla commune.

The Krzemionka originates in the southern part of the village of Teodorówka, at the foot of Chyrowa, at an altitude of approximately 600 m a.s.l. Initially, it flows northward. In its upper course, the stream forms the boundary between the villages of Teodorówka and Iwla. It then turns eastward toward the center of Teodorówka, where, at an elevation of about 374 m a.s.l., it flows into the Dukiełka as its left-bank tributary. The stream has a total length of 2.6 km and an average width of about 1.5 m.

The Krzemionka, together with an unnamed tributary, is listed in the Rozporządzeniu Rady Ministrów z dnia 17 grudnia 2002 r. w sprawie śródlądowych wód powierzchniowych lub części stanowiących własność publiczną (English: Regulation of the Council of Ministers of 17 December 2002 on inland surface waters or their parts constituting public property) as significant for water resource management and flood protection.
