= Wilkowo, Lubusz Voivodeship =

Wilkowo
- Village
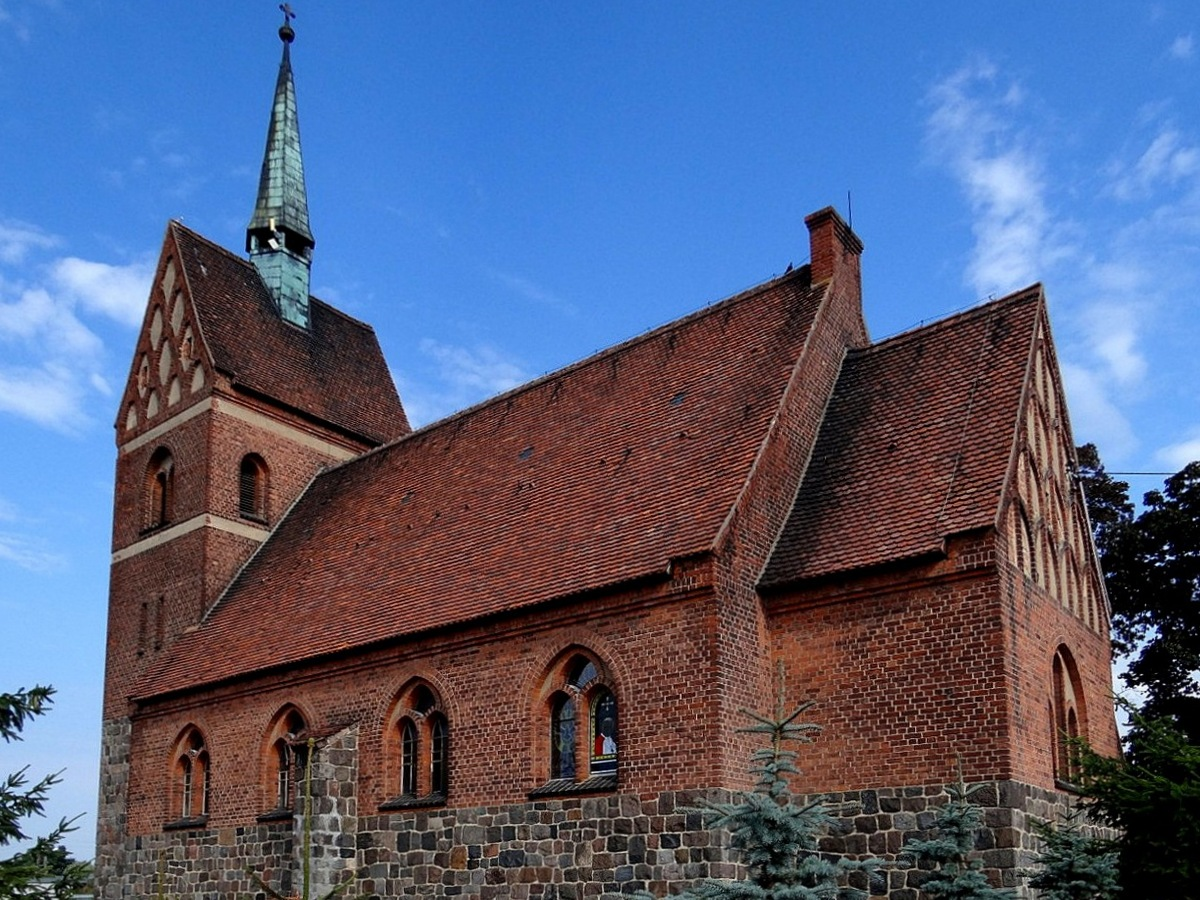
- Church of the Nativity of the Virgin Mary

- Location within Poland
- Coordinates: 52°15′16″N 15°27′51″E
- Country: Poland
- Voivodeship: Lubusz
- County: Świebodzin
- Gmina: Świebodzin
- Elevation: 8 m (26 ft)

Population
  - Total: 1,000

Wilkowo [vilˈkɔvɔ] is a village in the administrative district of Gmina Świebodzin, within Świebodzin County, Lubusz Voivodeship, in western Poland.
