= Podlesie, Świebodzin County =

Podlesie
- Village
- Location within Poland
- Coordinates: 52°9′46″N 15°35′59″E
- Country: Poland
- Voivodeship: Lubusz
- County: Świebodzin
- Gmina: Świebodzin

Podlesie [pɔdˈlɛɕɛ] is a village in the administrative district of Gmina Świebodzin, within Świebodzin County, Lubusz Voivodeship, in western Poland.
