= Krzemionka, Lubusz Voivodeship =

Krzemionka
- Settlement
- Location within Poland
- Coordinates: 52°16′28″N 15°27′55″E
- Country: Poland
- Voivodeship: Lubusz
- County: Świebodzin
- Gmina: Świebodzin

Krzemionka [kʂɛˈmjɔnka] is a settlement in the administrative district of Gmina Świebodzin, within Świebodzin County, Lubusz Voivodeship, in western Poland.
