= Gmina Świebodzin =

Gmina Świebodzin Świebodzin Commune
- Gmina
- Coat of arms
- Interactive map of Gmina Świebodzin
- Coordinates (Świebodzin): 52°15′N 15°32′E
- Country: Poland
- Voivodeship: Lubusz
- County: Świebodzin
- Seat: Świebodzin

Area
  - Total: 227.36 km^{2} (87.78 sq mi)

Population (2019-06-30)
  - Total: 30,044
  - Density: 132.14/km^{2} (342.25/sq mi)
  - Urban: 21,736
  - Rural: 8,308
- Website: www.um.swiebodzin.eu

Gmina Świebodzin is an urban-rural gmina (administrative district) in Świebodzin County, Lubusz Voivodeship, in western Poland. Its seat is the town of Świebodzin, which lies approximately 35 kilometres (22 mi) north of Zielona Góra and 57 km (35 mi) south of Gorzów Wielkopolski.

The gmina covers an area of 227.36 square kilometres (87.8 sq mi), and as of 2019 its total population is 30,044.

== Villages ==
Apart from the town of Świebodzin, Gmina Świebodzin contains the villages and settlements of Borów, Chociule, Glińsk, Gościkowo, Grodziszcze, Jeziory, Jordanowo, Kępsko, Krzemionka, Kupienino, Leniwka, Lubinicko, Lubogóra, Ługów, Miłkowo, Niedźwiady, Nowy Dworek, Osogóra, Podjezierze, Podlesie, Raków, Rosin, Rozłogi, Rudgerzowice, Rusinów, Rzeczyca, Wilkowo, Witosław, Wityń and Wygon.

== Neighbouring gminas ==
Gmina Świebodzin is bordered by the gminas of Lubrza, Międzyrzecz, Skąpe, Sulechów, Szczaniec and Trzciel.

== Twin towns – sister cities ==
Gmina Świebodzin is twinned with:

- Friesoythe, Germany
- Herzberg, Germany
- Neuenhagen bei Berlin, Germany
