= Dukiełka =

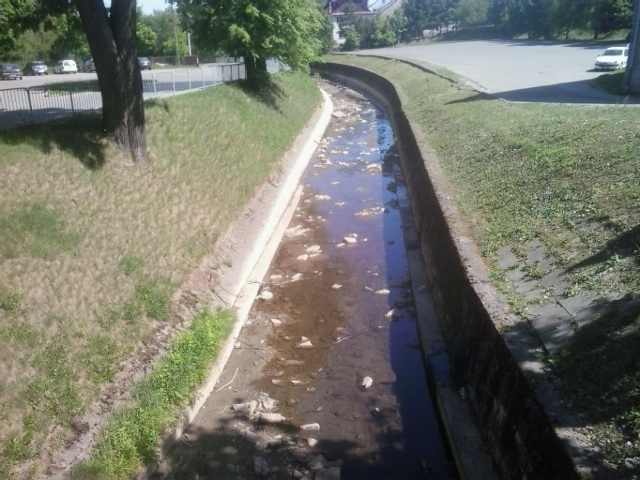
- Dukiełka in Dukla

Location
- Country: Poland
- Voivodeship: Subcarpathian Voivodeship
- County: Krosno County
- Municipality: Gmina Dukla
- Places: Teodorówka, Nadole, Dukla

Physical characteristics
- Source
  - location: Chyrowa, Beskid Dukielski, Low Beskids
  - coordinates: 49°31′58.5″N 21°39′20.6″E
  - elevation: 590 m (1,940 ft)
- Mouth
  - location: Jasiołka in Dukla
  - coordinates: 49°33′26.5″N 21°41′17.4″E
  - elevation: 323 m (1,060 ft)
- Length: 7.2 km (4.5 mi)
- Width
  - maximum: 6.5 m (21 ft)

Basin features
- Progression: Jasiołka→ Wisłoka→ Vistula→ Baltic Sea
- Cities: Dukla
- Tributaries
  - left: Krzemionka

The Dukiełka ([duˈkʲɛwka]; also spelled Dukielka, [duˈkʲɛlka]) is a stream in south-eastern Poland, located in the Subcarpathian Voivodeship, Krosno County, within the Dukla commune. It flows through the Low Beskids mesoregion.

== Description ==
The Dukiełka begins in the southern part of the village of Teodorówka, at the foot of Chyrowa, at an altitude of about 590 m (1,940 ft) above sea level. In its upper course, the stream flows northward, skirting the Krzemionka hill from the west. In the central part of Teodorówka, it receives its left-bank tributary, the Krzemionka, and then turns eastward. Along this stretch, it forms the boundary between Teodorówka and Nadole, and later between Nadole and the city of Dukla.

Within Dukla, the stream flows under National Road No. 19, and near the city park it joins the Jasiołka as its left tributary at approximately 323 m (1,060 ft) above sea level. The total length of the watercourse is 7.2 km (4.5 mi), and at its widest point it measures about 6.5 m (21 ft).

As well as the Krzemionka, the Kalitówka stream is sometimes also listed as a tributary of the Dukiełka.

== History ==
In the Middle Ages, the mouth of the Dukiełka marked the site of the first settlement of Dukla, which developed upstream along the stream. Near its mouth stood a brewery built probably before 1875, which was destroyed by fire in 1895. The brewery used water from the stream for beer production.

In 2014, the stream area was affected by flooding.

The Dukiełka forms the boundary between two parishes in Dukla: the St. Mary Magdalene parish (right bank) and the St. John of Dukla parish (left bank), effectively dividing the town in half.

=== Name ===
The name of the stream derives from the town of Dukla. In documents from 1336 it appears as river called Ducla (flumini dicti Ducla). Later sources list variants such as Dukielka (1402), Dukyelke (1503), and Dukelka (1861). In Witold Taszycki's 1965 publication Urzędowe nazwy miejscowości i obiektów fizjograficznych (English: Official Names of Localities and Physiographic Objects), the stream is officially listed as Dukiełka.

== Nature protection ==
The catchment area of the Dukiełka belongs to the protected water body named Jasiołka od Panny do Chlebianki (English: Jasiołka from Panna to Chlebianka) (code RW2000142184599). Its valley serves as an ecological corridor used by bats such as the greater mouse-eared bat and the lesser horseshoe bat.

The Dukiełka, together with the Krzemionka and an unnamed tributary of the Krzemionka, are listed in the Rozporządzeniu Rady Ministrów z dnia 17 grudnia 2002 r. w sprawie śródlądowych wód powierzchniowych lub części stanowiących własność publiczną (English: Regulation of the Council of Ministers of 17 December 2002 on inland surface waters or their parts constituting public property) as important for water resource management and flood protection. A weir crosses the stream within Dukla. The area of 3.8 km (2.4 mi) from the mouth of the Dukiełka has been designated by Wody Polskie as an ONNP (Obszar narażony na niebezpieczeństwo powodzi; English: Area exposed to the risk of flooding).

== Gallery ==
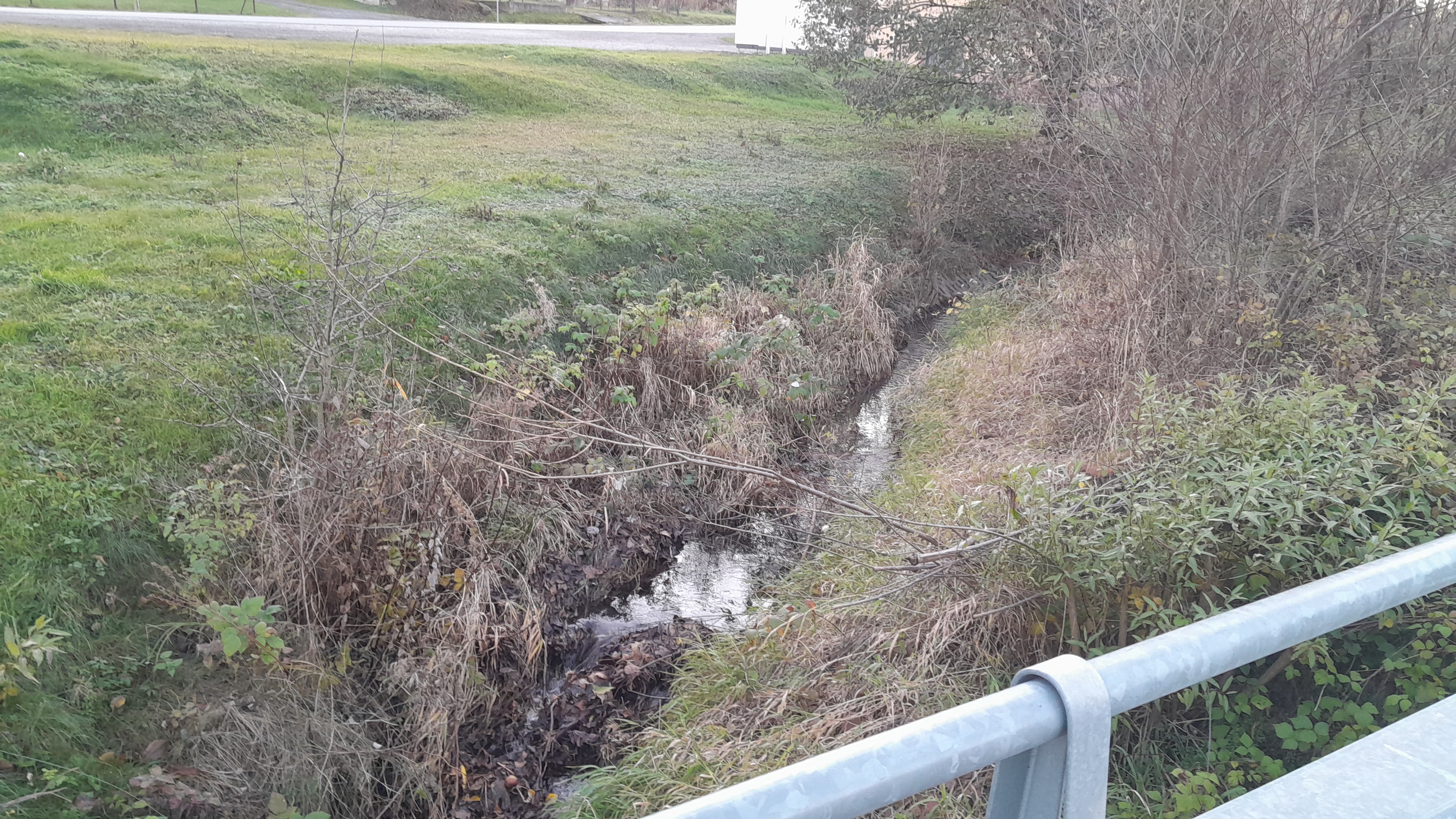
Dukiełka in Teodorówka

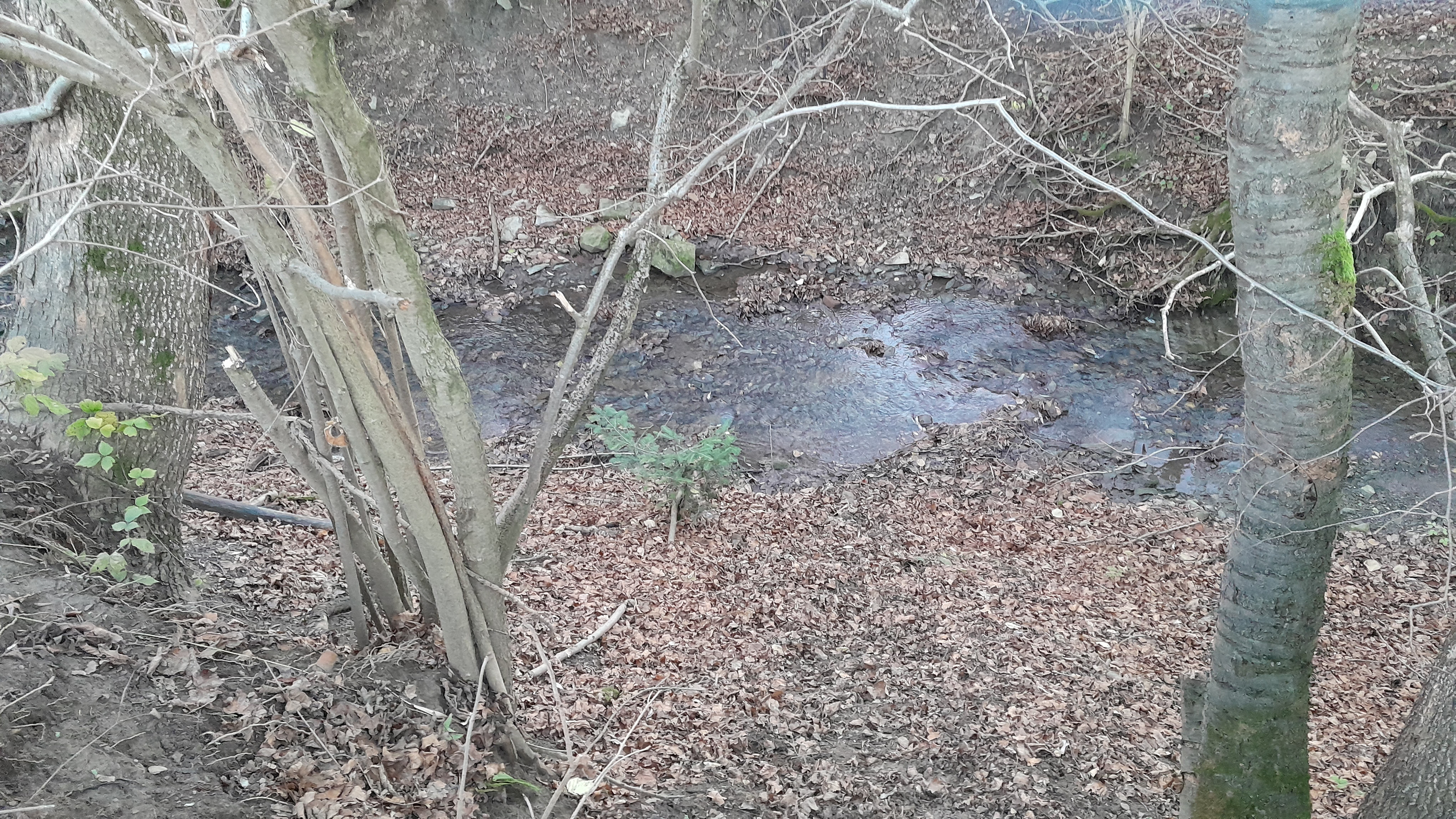
The Dukiełka near its confluence with the Krzemionka

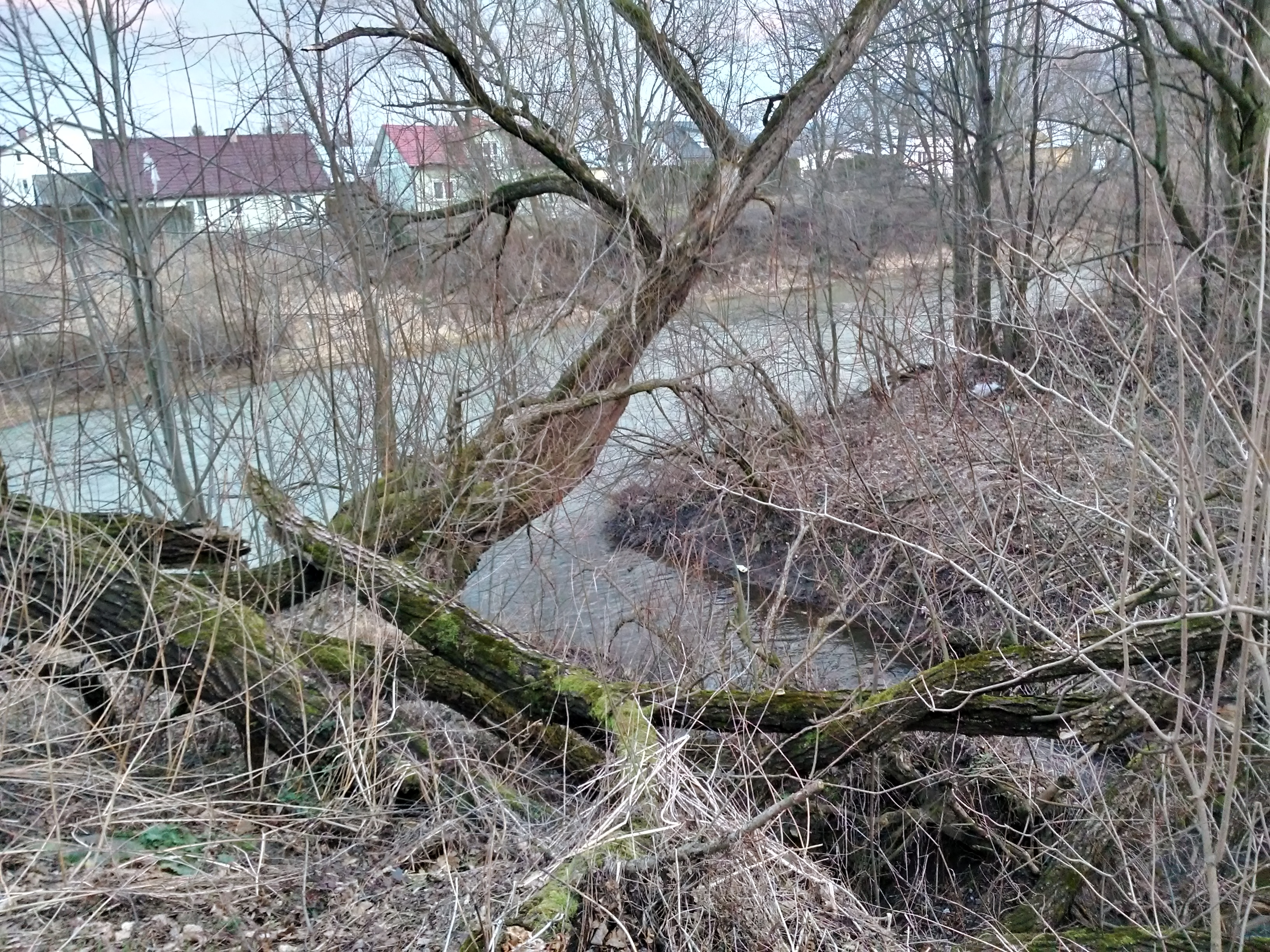
Mouth of the Dukiełka into the Jasiołka

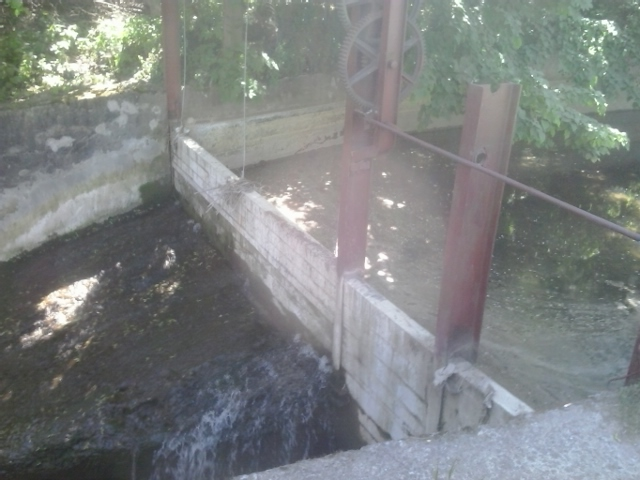
Weir on the Dukiełka in Dukla

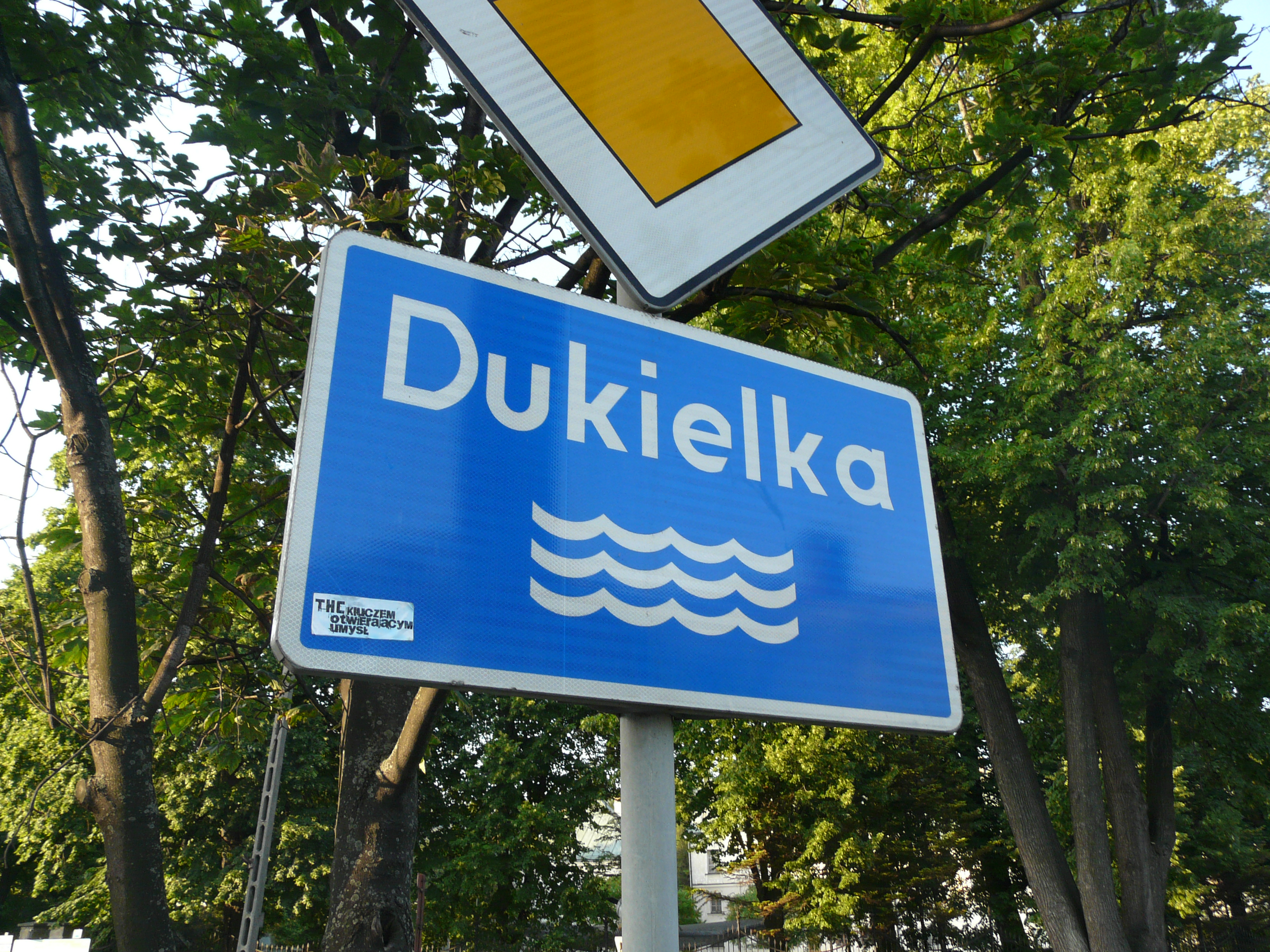
Road sign with the name "Dukielka"

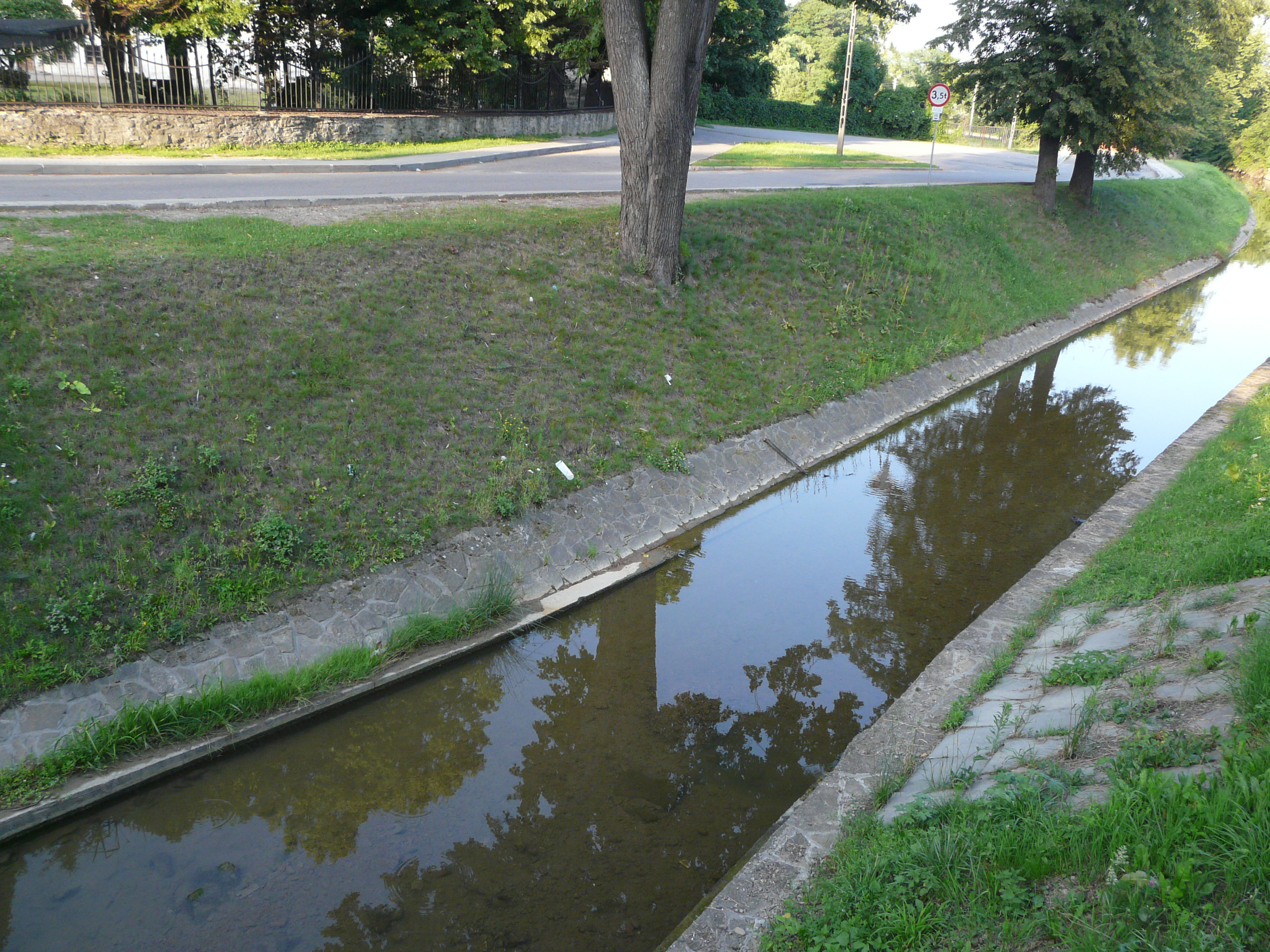
Dukiełka with raised water level
