= Podlesie, Głubczyce County =

Coordinates: 50°09′05″N 17°37′25″E

Podlesie
- Village
- Interactive map of Podlesie
- Country: Poland
- Voivodeship: Opole
- County: Głubczyce
- Gmina: Głubczyce

Podlesie [pɔdˈlɛɕɛ] is a village in the administrative district of Gmina Głubczyce, within Głubczyce County, Opole Voivodeship, in south-western Poland.
