= Świebodzin County =

Świebodzin County Powiat świebodziński
- County
- Flag Coat of arms

- Location within the voivodeship
- Coordinates (Świebodzin): 52°15′N 15°32′E
- Country: Poland
- Voivodeship: Lubusz
- Seat: Świebodzin
- Gminas: Total 6: Gmina Łagów; Gmina Lubrza; Gmina Skąpe; Gmina Świebodzin; Gmina Szczaniec; Gmina Zbąszynek

Area
  - Total: 937.45 km^{2} (361.95 sq mi)

Population (2019-06-30)
  - Total: 55,753
  - Density: 59.473/km^{2} (154.03/sq mi)
  - Urban: 26,756
  - Rural: 28,997
- Car plates: FSW
- Website: http://www.swiebodzin.pl

Świebodzin County (Polish: powiat świebodziński) is a unit of territorial administration and local government (powiat) in Lubusz Voivodeship, western Poland. It came into being on 1 January 1999 as a result of the Polish local government reforms passed in 1998. Its administrative seat and largest town is Świebodzin, which lies 35 km (22 mi) north of Zielona Góra and 57 km (35 mi) south of Gorzów Wielkopolski. The only other town in the county is Zbąszynek, lying 20 km (12 mi) east of Świebodzin.

The county covers an area of 937.45 square kilometres (362.0 sq mi). As of 2019 its total population is 55,753, out of which the population of Świebodzin is 21,736, that of Zbąszynek is 5,020, and the rural population is 28,997.

== Neighbouring counties ==
Świebodzin County is bordered by Międzyrzecz County to the north, Nowy Tomyśl County to the east, Zielona Góra County to the south, Krosno County to the south-west and Sulęcin County to the north-west.

== Administrative divisions ==
The county is subdivided into six gminas (two urban-rural and four rural). These are listed in the following table, in descending order of population.

Gmina	Type	Area (km^{2})	Population (2019)	Seat
Gmina Świebodzin	urban-rural	227.4	30,044	Świebodzin
Gmina Zbąszynek	urban-rural	94.4	8,292	Zbąszynek
Gmina Skąpe	rural	181.3	5,067	Skąpe
Gmina Łagów	rural	199.2	4,969	Łagów
Gmina Szczaniec	rural	112.9	3,847	Szczaniec
Gmina Lubrza	rural	122.3	3,534	Lubrza
