= Lubusz Voivodeship =

Coordinates: 52°11′43″N 15°20′51″E

Lubuskie Voivodeship Województwo lubuskie
- Voivodeship
- Flag Coat of arms Brandmark

- Location within Poland

- Division into counties
- Country: Poland
- Capitals: Gorzów Wielkopolski (voivode); Zielona Góra (executive board, Sejmik)
- Counties: 2 cities, 12 land counties *: Gorzów Wielkopolski; Zielona Góra; Gorzów County; Krosno County; Międzyrzecz County; Nowa Sól County; Słubice County; Strzelce-Drezdenko County; Sulęcin County; Świebodzin County; Wschowa County; Żagań County; Żary County; Zielona Góra County

Government
  - Body: Lubusz Voivodeship executive board
  - Voivode: Marek Cebula (PO)
  - Marshal: Sebastian Ciemnoczołowski (PO)
  - EP: Lubusz and West Pomeranian

Area
  - Total: 13,987.93 km^{2} (5,400.77 sq mi)

Population (2024-06-30)
  - Total: 972,140
  - Density: 69.498/km^{2} (180.00/sq mi)
  - Urban: 622,473
  - Rural: 349,667

GDP
  - Total: €17.660 billion (2024)
  - Per capita: €18,727 (2024)
- Time zone: UTC+1 (CET)
  - Summer (DST): UTC+2 (CEST)
- ISO 3166 code: PL-08
- Vehicle registration: F
- HDI (2019): 0.862 very high · 14th
- Website: lubuskie.pl
- further divided into 83 gminas

Lubusz Voivodeship (Polish: województwo lubuskie [vɔjɛˈvut͡stfɔ luˈbuskʲɛ]) is a voivodeship in western Poland with a population of 972,140. Its regional capitals are Gorzów Wielkopolski and Zielona Góra. The region is characterized by a landscape of forests, lakes, and rivers, and is bordered by Germany to the west.

The functions of regional capital are shared between two cities – Gorzów Wielkopolski and Zielona Góra. Gorzów serves as the seat of the centrally-appointed voivode (wojewoda), or governor, and Zielona Góra is the seat of the elected regional assembly (sejmik) and the executive elected by that assembly, headed by a marshal (marszałek). In addition, the voivodeship includes a third city (Nowa Sól) and a number of towns.

Lubusz Voivodeship borders West Pomeranian Voivodeship to the north, Greater Poland Voivodeship to the east, Lower Silesian Voivodeship to the south, and Germany (Brandenburg and Saxony) to the west.

It was created on January 1, 1999, out of the former Gorzów Voivodeship and Zielona Góra Voivodeship, pursuant to the Polish local government reforms adopted in 1998. The province's name recalls the historic Lubusz Land (Lebus or Lubus), although parts of the voivodeship belong to the historic regions of Lower Silesia, Greater Poland, and Lower Lusatia.

== History ==
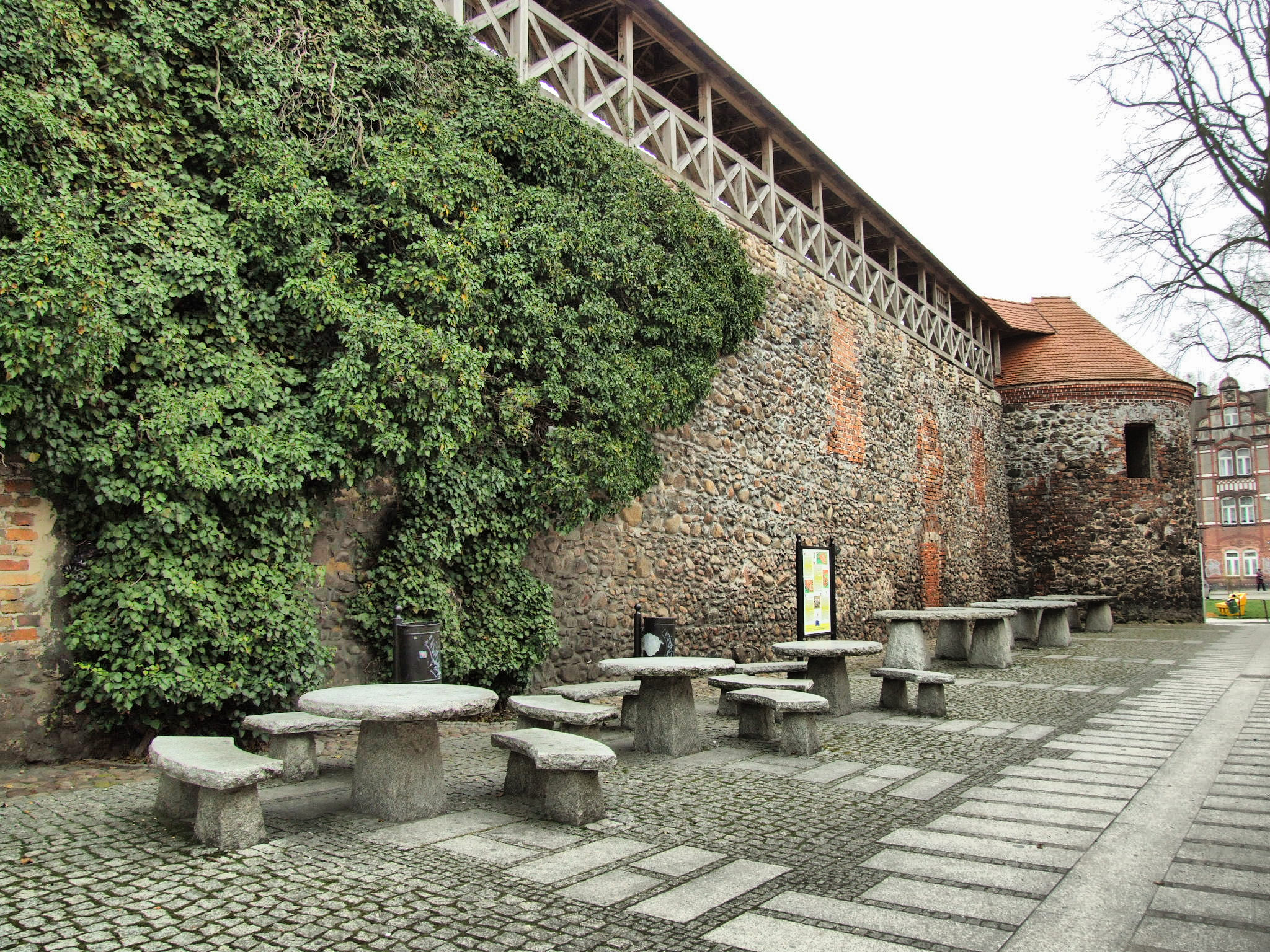
Medieval town walls of Żary, one of the oldest towns in the province, first mentioned in 1007

During the formation and early expansion of the Polish state under its first rulers, Mieszko I and Bolesław I the Brave, the entire territory of the present Lubusz Voivodeship became part of Poland by 1002, including the historic Lubusz Land, part of which is located on the western bank of the Oder River, including its capital Lubusz, now Lebus in Germany. The oldest towns in the region, dating back over 1,000 years, include Trzciel, Skwierzyna, Iłowa, Szprotawa, Jasień, Krosno Odrzańskie, Międzyrzecz and Żary, with most other towns also founded in the Middle Ages, including the current regional capitals of Zielona Góra and Gorzów Wielkopolski. The youngest towns are Łęknica, Czerwieńsk, Nowa Sól, Szlichtyngowa and Zbąszynek, all either first mentioned or established in the later periods.

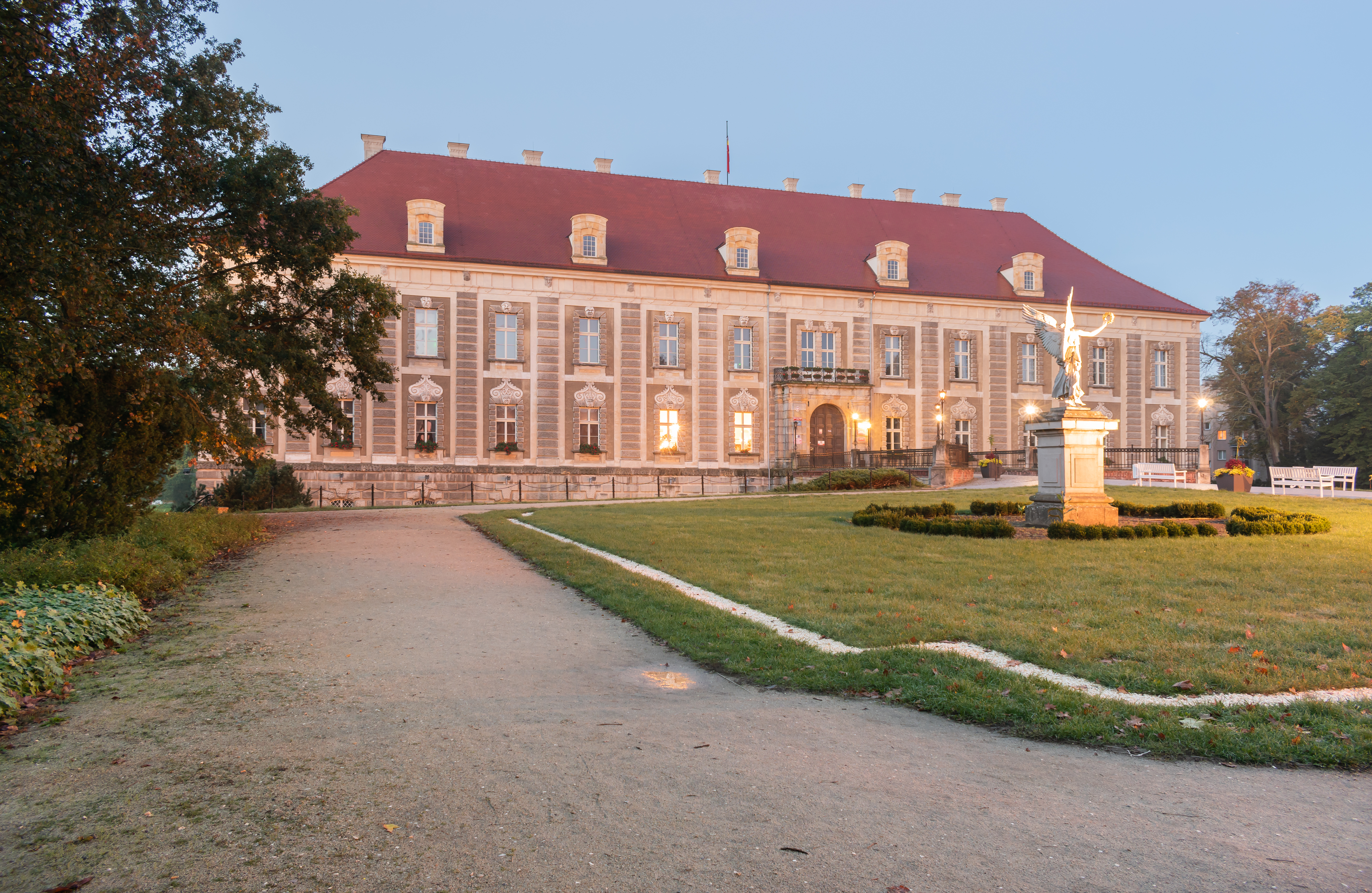
Żagań with its castle was a ducal seat for several centuries

Following the fragmentation of Poland into smaller provincial duchies, various portions of the present Lubusz Voivodeship were part of various duchies, initially the duchies of Greater Poland and Silesia, and later also Poznań, Legnica, Głogów, Lubusz and Żagań, ruled by various lines of the Piast dynasty. Over time, portions of the present Lubusz Voivodeship were lost by Poland. In 1250 the Lubusz Land was acquired by the Ascanian margraves of Brandenburg. In 1319–1326 it was contested by various Polish and German rulers, before falling back to Brandenburg. After Brandenburg passed to the Bohemian Crown in 1373, Poland made a peaceful attempt to regain the northern portion of the area. In 1402, the Bohemian rulers reached an agreement with Poland in Kraków. Poland was to buy and re-incorporate the northern outskirts of the present Lubusz Voivodeship, but eventually the Bohemian rulers sold the area to the Teutonic Order, who in turn sold it back to Brandenburg in 1454 to raise funds for war against Poland. The southern part of the current voivodeship remained part of the duchies of Żagań and Głogów, ruled by the houses of Piast and Jagiellon, with the Żagań duchy eventually passing to houses of foreign background, including Czech, Saxon and French, whereas other areas were gradually incorporated directly into the Kingdom of Bohemia. In 1635, most of the south-western part of the present Lubusz Voivodeship passed from Bohemia to Saxony, and from 1697 formed part of Poland-Saxony. In the 18th century, Wschowa was an important royal city of Poland, as it often hosted Polish kings and several sessions of the Polish Senate, hence being dubbed the "unofficial capital of Poland". King Augustus III of Poland also often stopped in Brody. Wschowa and Gubin had important mints that struck Polish coins.

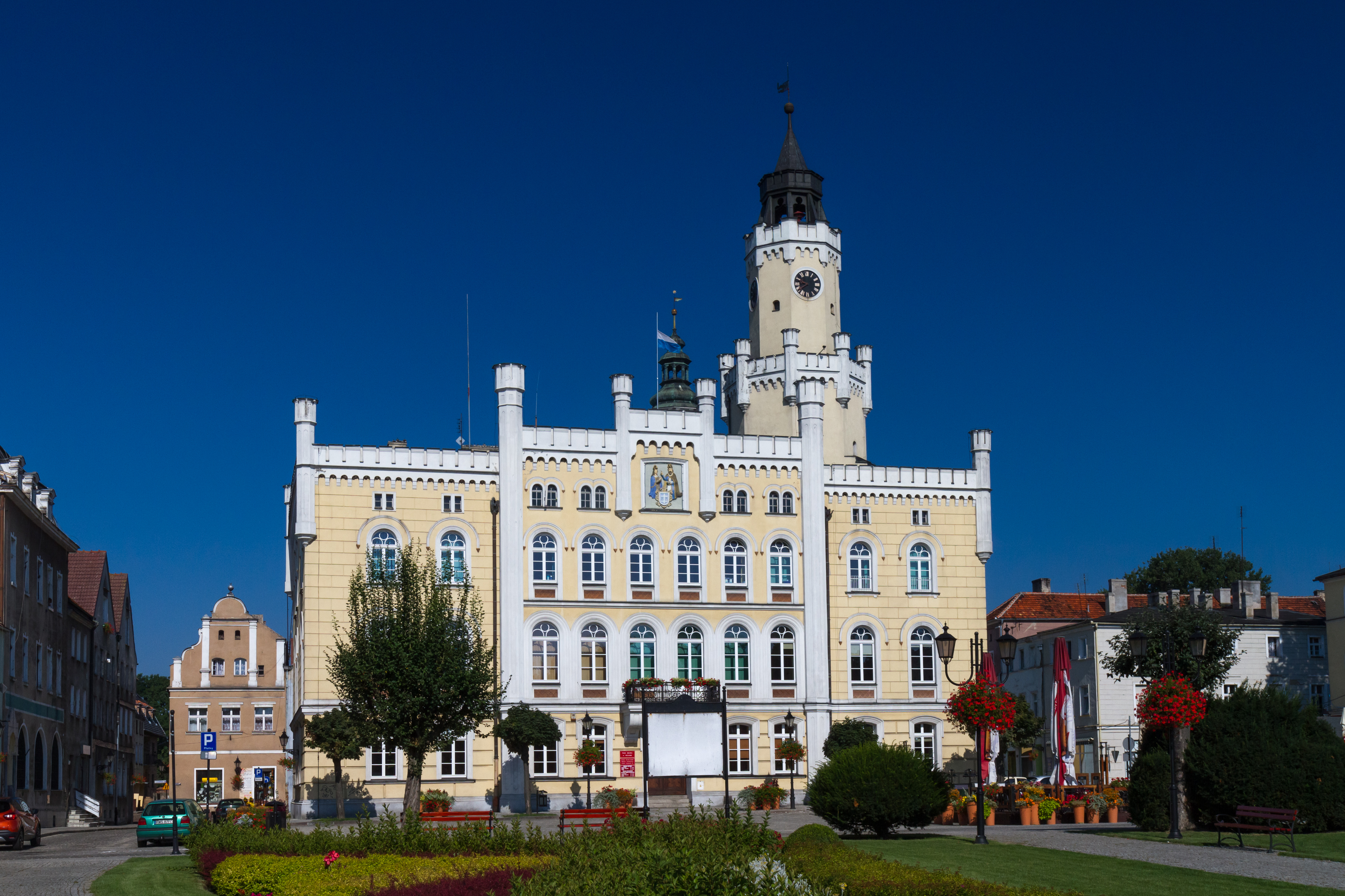
Wschowa, important royal city of Poland in the 18th century, dubbed the "unofficial capital of Poland"

In 1701, the Kingdom of Prussia was established, which included Brandenburg-held Lubusz Land, and various areas were eventually gradually annexed by Prussia in the following centuries, starting with the south-eastern part of the current voivodeship in 1742, followed by eastern portions (western outskirts of Greater Poland) in 1793 (briefly regained by Poles in 1807–1815 as part of the short-lived Duchy of Warsaw), and the south-western part in 1815. Within Prussia and Germany the territory was divided between the provinces of Neumark/Brandenburg, South Prussia/Posen, and Silesia/Lower Silesia.

During World War II, the Oflag II-C, Stalag III-C, Stalag VIII-C and Stalag Luft III major German prisoner-of-war camps for Polish, French, British, Belgian, Canadian, Serbian, Italian, American, Australian, New Zealander, Soviet, Norwegian, Czech, Slovak, South African, Dutch, Greek, Yugoslav, Senegalese, Algerian and Moroccan POWs were operated in the territory. The latter was the site of the "Great Escape" in 1944. There are museums at the site of the camps in Dobiegniew and Żagań, and a memorial to the victims of the Stalag Luft III murders in Żagań. Particularly infamous camps in the region were the Oderblick labor education camp in Świecko and the Sonnenburg concentration camp in Słońsk, in which Polish, Belgian, French, Bulgarian, Dutch, Yugoslav, Russian, Italian, Ukrainian, Luxembourgish, Danish, Norwegian, Czech, Slovak and other prisoners were held, and many died. There were also eleven subcamps of the Gross-Rosen concentration camp and a subcamp of the Sachsenhausen concentration camp, in which mostly Jewish and Polish, but also French, Russian, Czech, Italian, Greek, Yugoslav, Dutch, Romanian, Hungarian, Lithuanian and German prisoners were held. Obrzyce was the place of Aktion T4 murders of mentally ill and disabled people. The region was the site of fierce fighting during the war in 1945. During the liberation of the Stalag III-C camp, Soviet troops killed some American POWs mistaking them for enemy troops. On 18 March 1945, the Germans shot down an American bomber near Bucze.

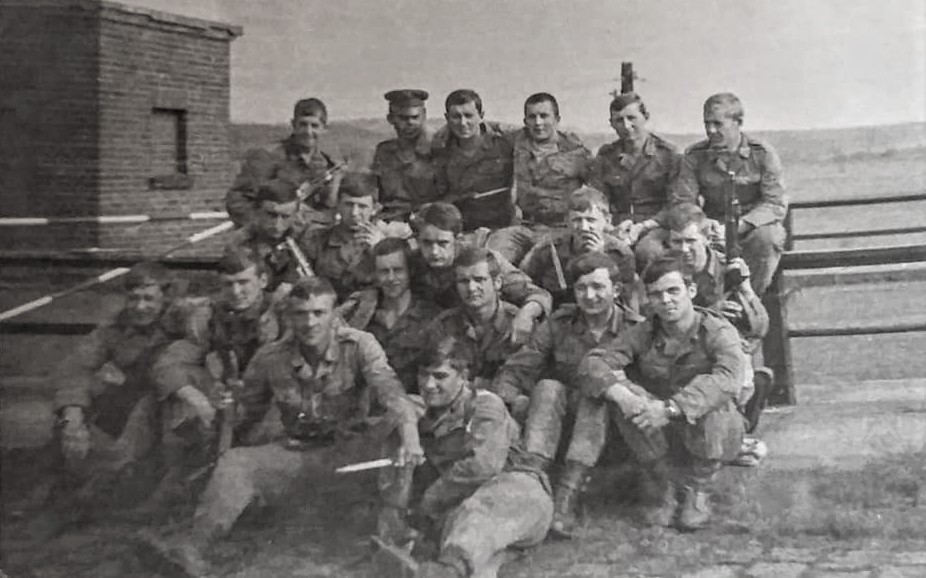
Polish Border Protection Troops in Olszyna in 1969

Under the terms laid down by Joseph Stalin in the Potsdam Agreement, the borders of Poland and Germany were redrawn and the area of the Lubusz Voivodeship fell within the new borders of Poland.

In 1998, the government of Jerzy Buzek decided to introduce an administrative reform, with its principles including the restoration of counties and a steep reduction in the number of voivodeships. A general consensus existed among scholars that the local administration exercised through the 49 existing voivodeships established in 1975 was inefficient, anachronistic, impractical, detrimental to maintaining regional identity, and untenable. However, the reform draft accepted by the government surprised the public and caused widespread outcry, as its authors foresaw creation of only 12 large voivodships, thus going much further than the widely expected reconstitution of the 17 voivodeships existing prior to the 1975 reform. As a consequence, the original draft made no provision for a separate Lubusz voivodeship – Gorzów was to become along with Kostrzyn, Strzelce Krajeńskie and Drezdenko a part of West Pomeranian Voivodeship, Zielona Góra was to be included along with Krosno, Nowa Sól, Żagań, Gubin and Żary in the Lower Silesian Voivodeship, while a narrow horizontal strip encompassing Międzyrzecz, Sulęcin, Świebodzin, Słubice and Sulechów was to be assigned to the Greater Poland Voivodeship as a bizarre sort-of corridor to the German border. However, mass protests broke out as a result in the cities such as Bydgoszcz, Koszalin, Opole or Kielce. Many of the people opposing the draft reform initially demanded retaining as many as 25 voivodeships (including the 2 ones seated in Gorzów and Zielona Góra), a number nevertheless widely regarded as a demand intentionally excessive to serve as an initial negotiating bargain, actually aiming to restore the 17 voivodeships existing prior to 1975 as an ultimate compromise. As Poland was at the time governed under political cohabitation, the opposition party constituting the political background of the President decided to capitalize on the popular discontent which erupted against the government on an unanticipated scale; the most obvious mean readily available for the opposition was a presidential veto, which in fact ensued. In order to salvage the reform from being killed altogether, the government was, in the face of lacking the supermajority required to overturn the veto at the time, forced to reconsider the original shape of the reform and to reconcile it with the reservations of the President and his political background, with the result of a compromise adjustment increasing the number of voivodeships to 16, with Lubusz Voivodeship included among the four additional ones created according to the agreement.

The path leading to such and outcome was far from smooth. The government made an effort to highlight and exploit the decades-long animosity between the approximately same-size two principal cities, spreading scare against its inevitable re-ignition and explosion in any of these two cities after designating the other one as the voivodeship capital, and hoping to use the engineered scare as the main argument in the ongoing discussions against creating the Lubusz voivodeship, The animosity, existing indeed between the cities, has been historically rooted in a widespread perception among Gorzów inhabitants that the 1950 decision to designate Zielona Góra as the voivodeship capital instead of their larger and more populous city, was taken by the anticlerical communist government due to a hidden motivation of punishing Gorzów for becoming the see of the newly established Roman Catholic apostolic administration governing the majority of the Recovered Territories, with the ensuing discrimination of the city by the voivodeship authorities in the years 1950–1975 in terms of establishing any new public cultural and educational institutions, other public investments or public funds allocations, in vivid contrast to the unjust favoring of their own seat, the city of Zielona Góra; a sentiment reinforced further by the surprise relocation of the see of the Roman Catholic Diocese of Gorzów to Zielona Góra in 1992, renamed as a result the Roman Catholic Diocese of Zielona Góra-Gorzów, and finally and perhaps most importantly, by the historical, perpetual and almost sacred rivalry between the motorcycle speedway clubs located in both cities. The objective of the local elites in Zielona Góra was in turn to become a single capital centre, reverting to the situation before 1975, while any prospect of sharing the governing institutions was for a long time treated with their hostility. In spite of that, the looming threat of a "everybody lose" scenario set to materialize in case of a possible implementation of the original reform draft, paved the way for neutralizing this argument through forcing both rival sides into the breakthrough reconciliation accord known as the Paradyż Agreement, brokered by the Roman Catholic Diocese of Zielona Góra-Gorzów and formalized in a document signed during a highly publicized local summit in the Gościkowo-Paradyż Abbey on 13 March 1998. This compromise agreement, was negotiated and concluded between the delegations of both rival cities, composed of the respectively aligned most powerful local and national scene politicians and business people, with its most important provision being the unusual arrangement to divide and distribute the governing institutions of the voivodeship more or less equally between the two cities. On the basis of this broadly supported agreement, an effective public pressure endorsed jointly by the two centers was successfully exerted on the central government which ultimately acquiesced to the demand of establishing Lubusz Voivodeship.

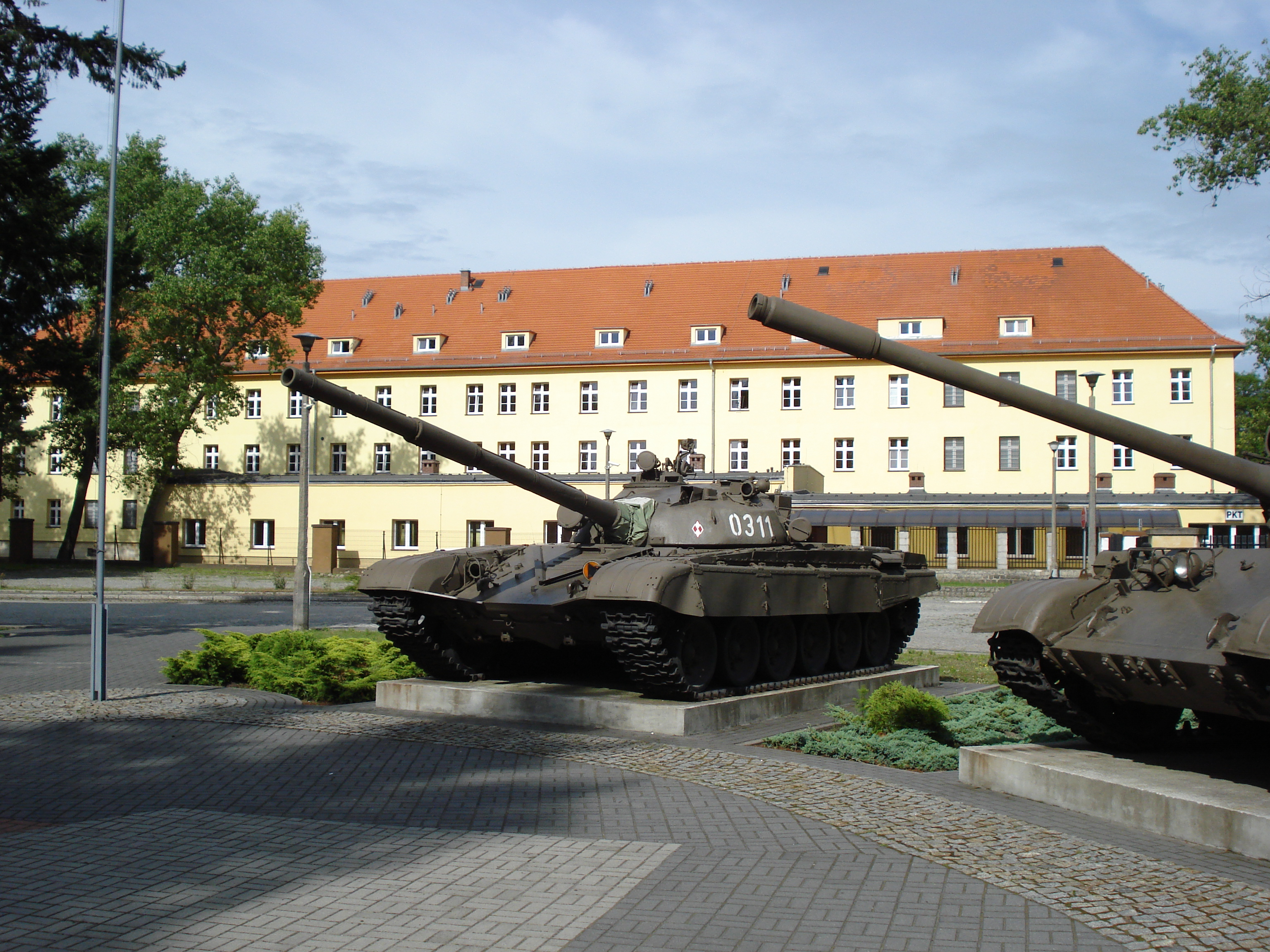
Polish Land Forces barracks in Żagań

Nevertheless, creating any new type of public institution at voivodeship level in Poland continues to ignite almost automatically a fierce battle in the Lubusz Voivodeship regarding the seat of the institution. There have also been numerous attempts to relocate some of the existing public institutions under various pretexts from one city to another, in some cases successful, as well as of merging a pair of equal institutions of a type existing in both cities, in order to make one of them a branch of the other, with obscure or no justification in most cases for such merger. Nevertheless, a general local majority consensus prevails that the compromise, although unsatisfactory for any of the two cities, spared both of them the fate of a number of cities which lost in 1999 entirely the status of a voivodeship capital and all voivodeship-level institutions, along with the associated attractiveness and prestige of the city as a place to live, crucial for its growth, with the ensuing profoundly detrimental phenomena.

== Geography ==
The Lubusz Voivodeship is a land of forests and lakes; forests cover 48% of the area. The river Oder, flowing through the voivodeship, is one of the few large European rivers retaining broadleaved and riparian forests. Areas with the highest natural values are protected as national parks (Drawa National Park and Warta Mouth National Park), landscape parks and wildlife reserves. The 19th century Muskau Park, located on both sides of the Polish–German border, has entered the UNESCO World Heritage List. The voivodeship abounds in lakes, especially in its central and northern parts; around those lakes numerous bathing resorts, holiday centres and farms offering tourist services have been established.

== Cities and towns ==
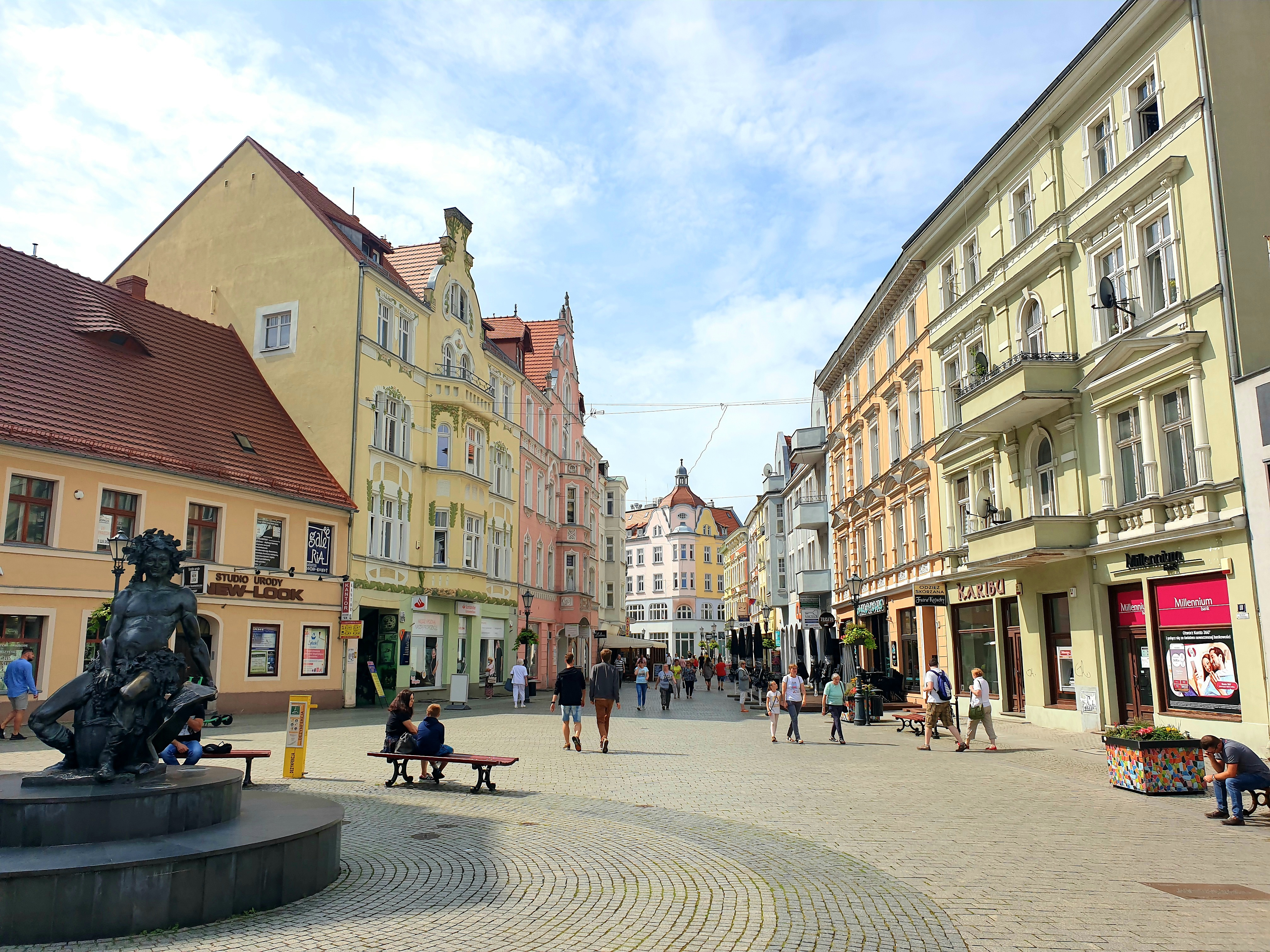
Zielona Góra is the seat of the provincial assembly

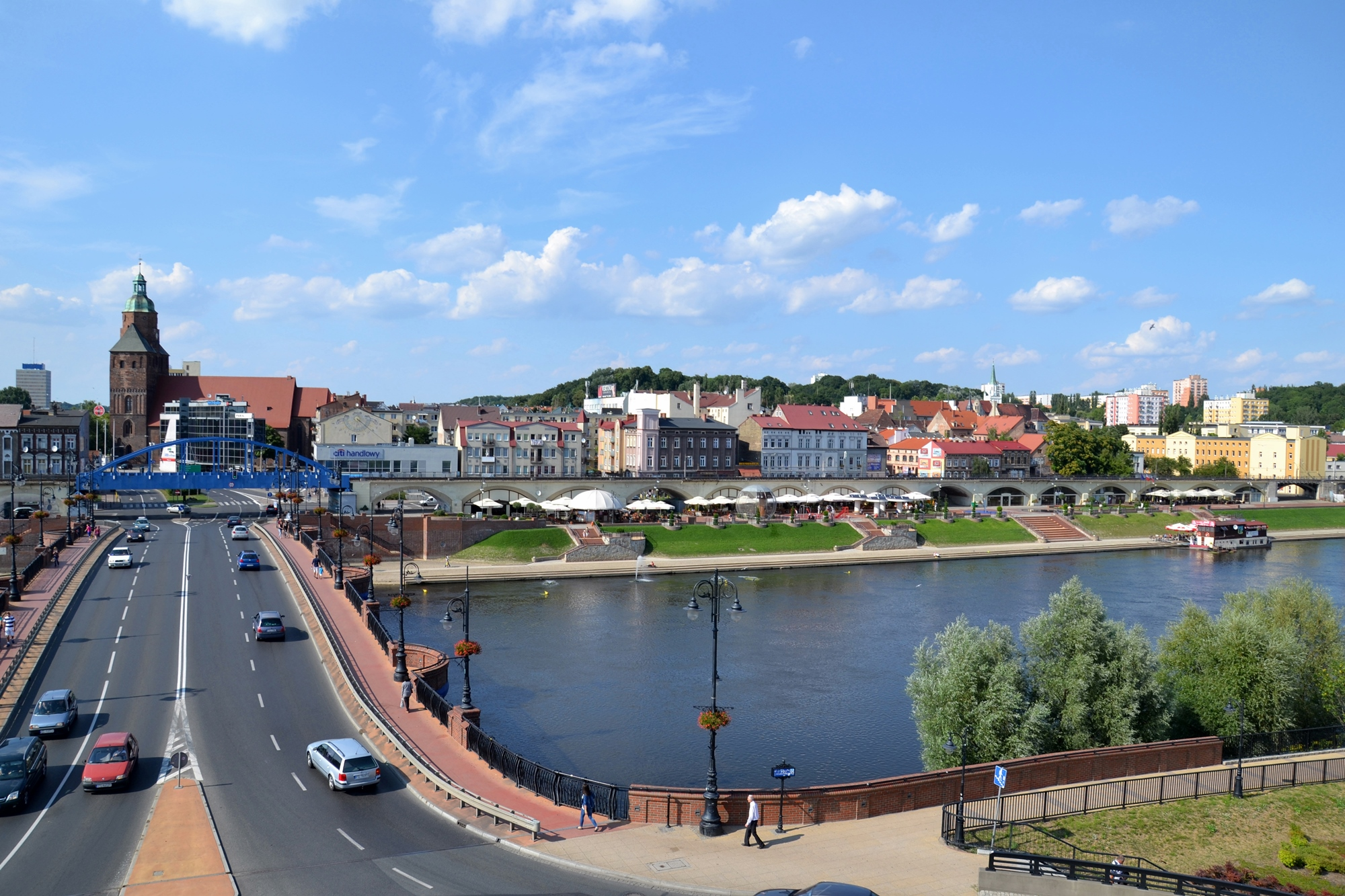
Gorzów Wielkopolski is the seat of the voivodeship governor

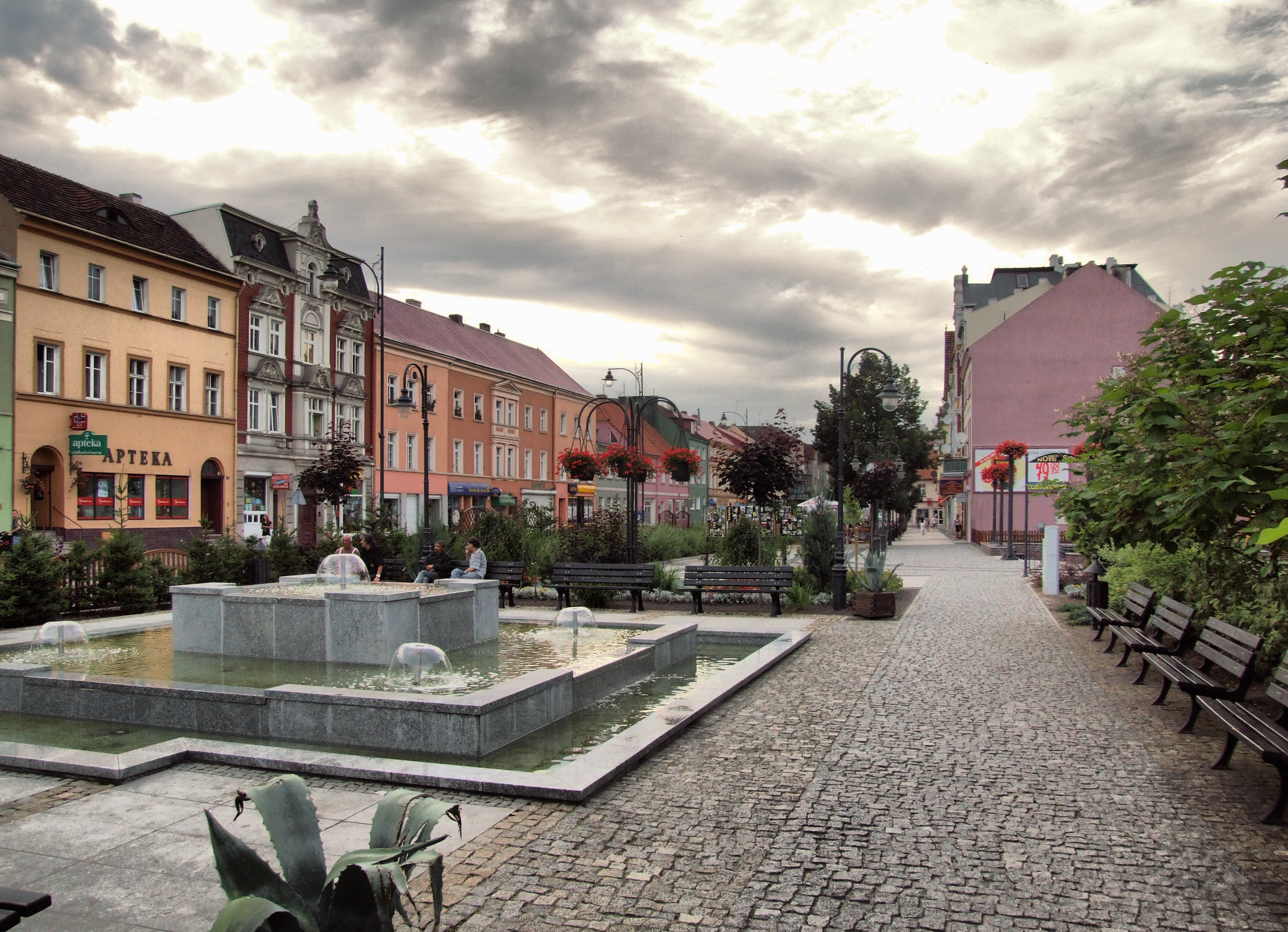
Nowa Sól is part of historic Lower Silesia

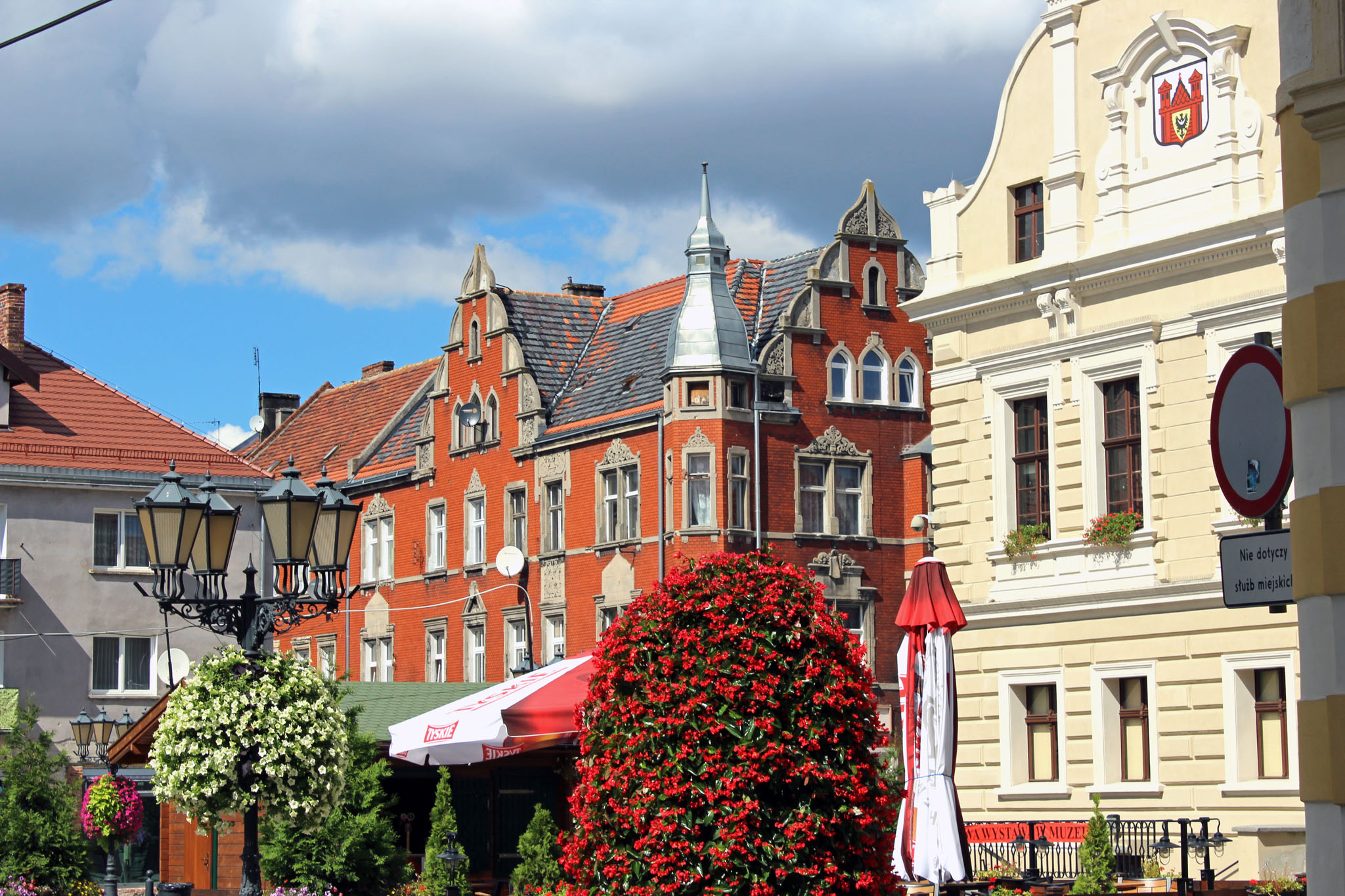
Świebodzin

Historical population
Year	Pop.	±%
1988	982,684	—
2002	1,008,954	+2.7%
2011	1,022,843	+1.4%
2021	991,213	−3.1%

The voivodeship contains 3 cities and 40 towns. These are listed below in descending order of population (as of 2021):

Cities (governed by a city mayor or prezydent miasta):
1. Zielona Góra (140,708)
2. Gorzów Wielkopolski (121,714)
3. Nowa Sól (37,931)

Towns:

1. Żary (36,783)
2. Żagań (25,110)
3. Świebodzin (21,428)
4. Kostrzyn nad Odrą (17,656)
5. Międzyrzecz (17,580)
6. Słubice (16,510)
7. Sulechów (16,477)
8. Gubin (16,427)
9. Lubsko (13,647)
10. Wschowa (13,635)
11. Szprotawa (11,447)
12. Krosno Odrzańskie (11,079)
13. Sulęcin (9,930)
14. Drezdenko (9,883)
15. Strzelce Krajeńskie (9,771)
16. Skwierzyna (9,412)
17. Kożuchów (9,231)
18. Witnica (6,640)
19. Rzepin (6,454)
20. Nowogród Bobrzański (5,033)
21. Zbąszynek (4,980)
22. Sława (4,242)
23. Bytom Odrzański (4,219)
24. Jasień (4,188)
25. Czerwieńsk (3,911)
26. Ośno Lubuskie (3,884)
27. Babimost (3,859)
28. Iłowa (3,831)
29. Kargowa (3,762)
30. Małomice (3,499)
31. Dobiegniew (3,011)
32. Gozdnica (2,941)
33. Cybinka (2,764)
34. Nowe Miasteczko (2,710)
35. Torzym (2,521)
36. Łęknica (2,382)
37. Trzciel (2,330)
38. Lubniewice (2,078)
39. Otyń (1,657)
40. Szlichtyngowa (1,268)
41. Brody (892)

== Administrative divisions ==
Lubusz Voivodeship is divided into 14 counties (powiats): 2 city counties and 12 land counties. These are further divided into 82 gminas.

The counties are listed in the following table (ordering within categories is by decreasing population).

English and Polish names	Area (km^{2})	Population (2019)	Seat	Other towns	Total gminas
Cities with powiat rights
Zielona Góra	279	140,871			1
Gorzów Wielkopolski	86	123,691			1
Land counties
Żary County powiat żarski	1,393	96,496	Żary	Lubsko, Jasień, Łęknica, Brody	10
Nowa Sól County powiat nowosolski	771	86,284	Nowa Sól	Kożuchów, Bytom Odrzański, Nowe Miasteczko	8
Żagań County powiat żagański	1,131	79,297	Żagań	Szprotawa, Iłowa, Małomice, Gozdnica	9
Zielona Góra County powiat zielonogórski	1,350	75,626	Zielona Góra*	Sulechów, Nowogród Bobrzański, Babimost, Czerwieńsk, Kargowa	9
Gorzów County powiat gorzowski	1,213	71,669	Gorzów Wielkopolski*	Kostrzyn nad Odrą, Witnica	7
Międzyrzecz County powiat międzyrzecki	1,388	57,851	Międzyrzecz	Skwierzyna, Trzciel	6
Świebodzin County powiat świebodziński	937	55,753	Świebodzin	Zbąszynek	6
Krosno County powiat krośnieński	1,390	55,018	Krosno Odrzańskie	Gubin	7
Strzelce-Drezdenko County powiat strzelecko-drezdenecki	1,248	49,156	Strzelce Krajeńskie	Drezdenko, Dobiegniew	5
Słubice County powiat słubicki	1,000	47,018	Słubice	Rzepin, Ośno Lubuskie, Cybinka	5
Wschowa County powiat wschowski	625	38,960	Wschowa	Sława, Szlichtyngowa	3
Sulęcin County powiat sulęciński	1,177	35,238	Sulęcin	Torzym, Lubniewice	5
* seat not part of the county

== Cuisine ==
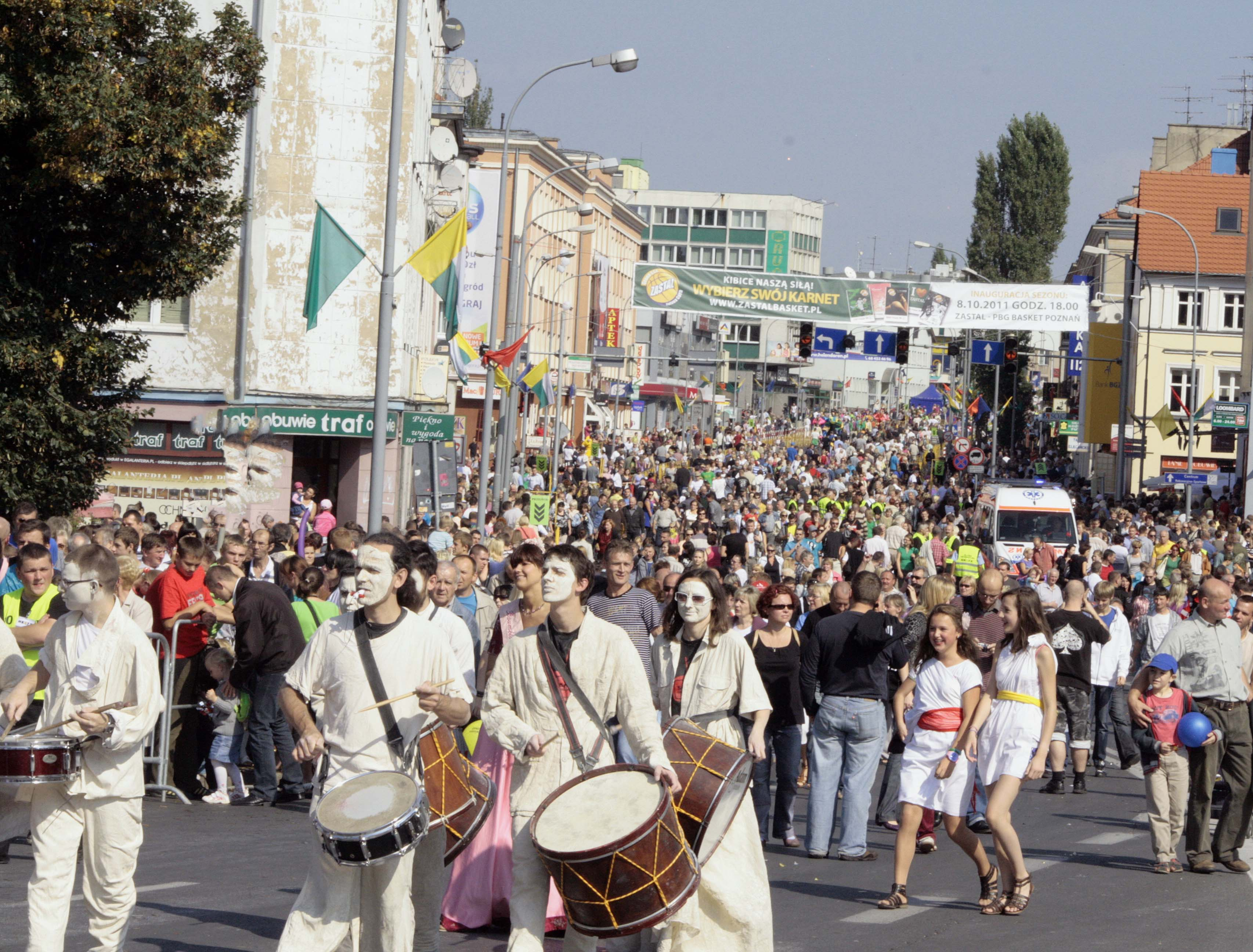
2012 Zielona Góra Wine Fest

The voivodeship, especially its northern part, is a notable for production of honey, with several varieties listed as traditional foods by the Ministry of Agriculture and Rural Development of Poland, and the Saint Michael's Honey Fair held annually in Gorzów Wielkopolski.

The southern part of the voivodeship with Zielona Góra is one of the leading winemaking regions of Poland, and other traditional beverages from the voivodeship are beer, mead, nalewki and vodka. Zielona Góra hosts the annual Zielona Góra Wine Fest, the largest wine fest in Poland.

Various types of traditional Polish kiełbasa, also designated as traditional foods by the Ministry of Agriculture and Rural Development of Poland, are produced in the Nowa Sól, Wschowa, Zielona Góra, Żagań and Żary counties in the southern part of the Lubusz Voivodeship, whereas Siedlisko, Nowa Sól County produces a variety of traditional cheeses and quarks. Sława with its environs is one of the main poultry-farming regions in Poland, particularly for turkeys, and specializes in the production of various turkey sausages and other meat products.

== Economy ==
The gross domestic product (GDP) of the province was 10.8 billion euros in 2018, accounting for 2.2% of Polish economic output. The GDP per capita adjusted for purchasing power was 17,600 euros or 58% of the EU27 average in the same year. The GDP per employee was 67% of the EU average.

== Transport ==
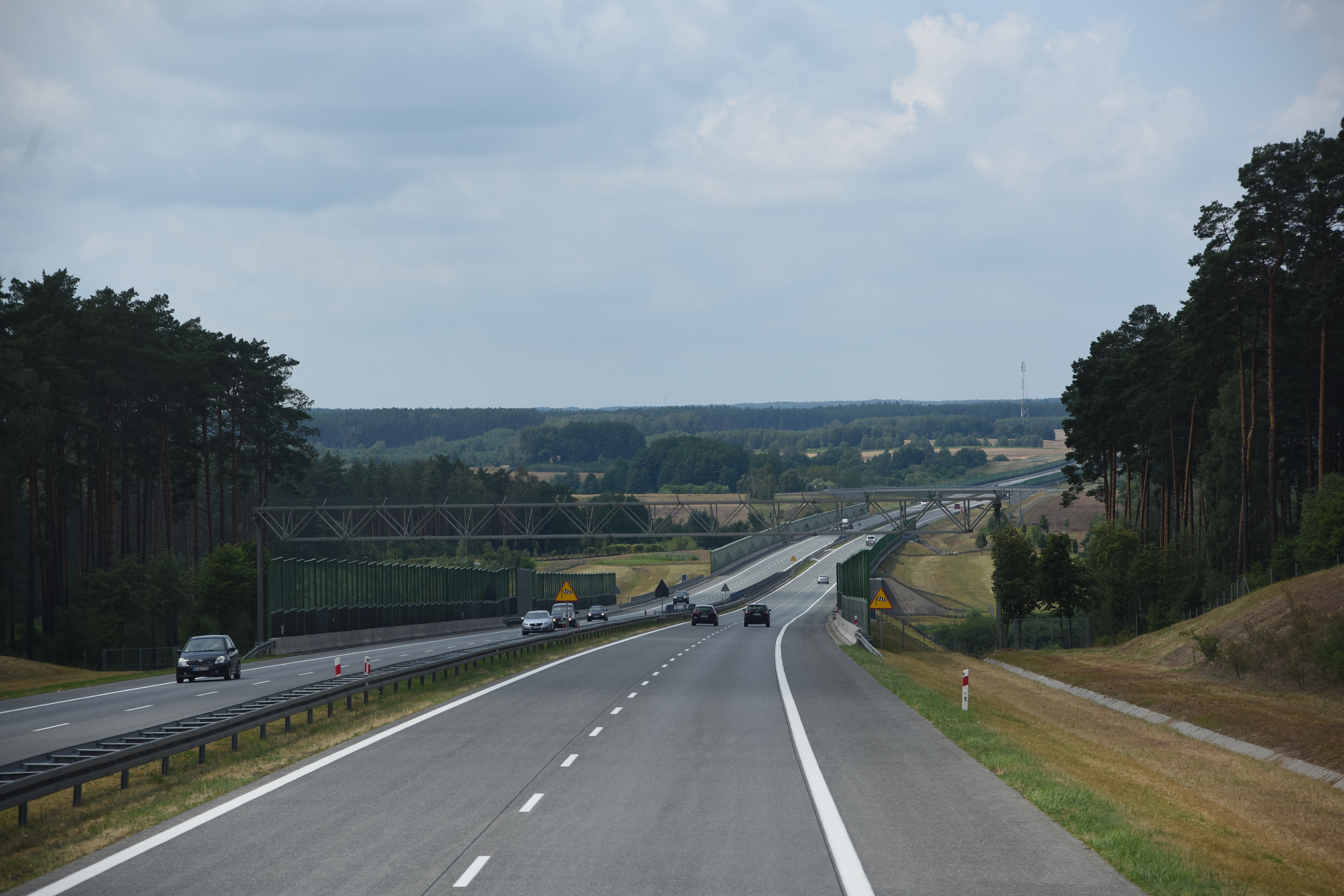
A2 autostrada with view towards west in the Voivodeship

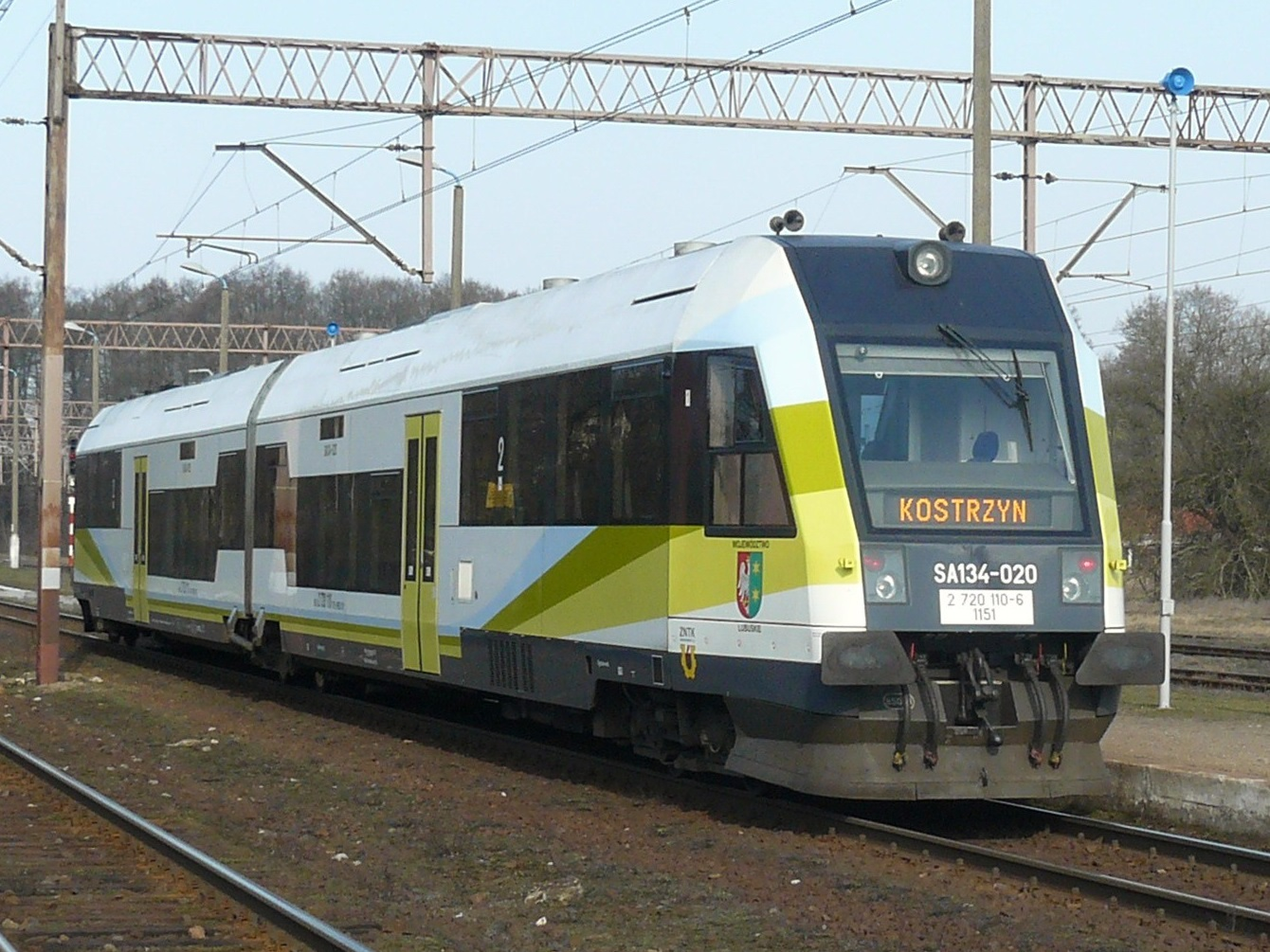
Polregio SA134 at Nowe Drezdenko in August 2013

The sole airport in the voivodeship is the Zielona Góra Airport. The A2, A18 and S3 highways pass through the province.

=== Rail ===
The dominant rail operator of the voivodeship is the Lubusz branch of Polregio, which operates regional passenger trains under a contract with the Lubusz Voivodeship. The branch is based in Zielona Góra, and its services cover much of the region, with some extending to neighbouring voivodeships.

Since 2024, the Lubusz Voivodeship has been planning to operate passenger trains under its own company, Lubusz Public Transport (LTP), which was founded in the following year. The voivodeship is currently on a 10-year contract with Polregio; but is considering to terminate it early. This came after the Lubusz Voivodeship complained about Polregio's "mass train cancellations" and "shortage of trains", implying that the rolling stock of the Lubusz branch is very limited, consisting of mostly older stock. The president of Polregio, Andrzej Pawłowski, said "establishing your own company will not be a miracle solution that will automatically heal the rolling stock situation".

== Protected areas ==
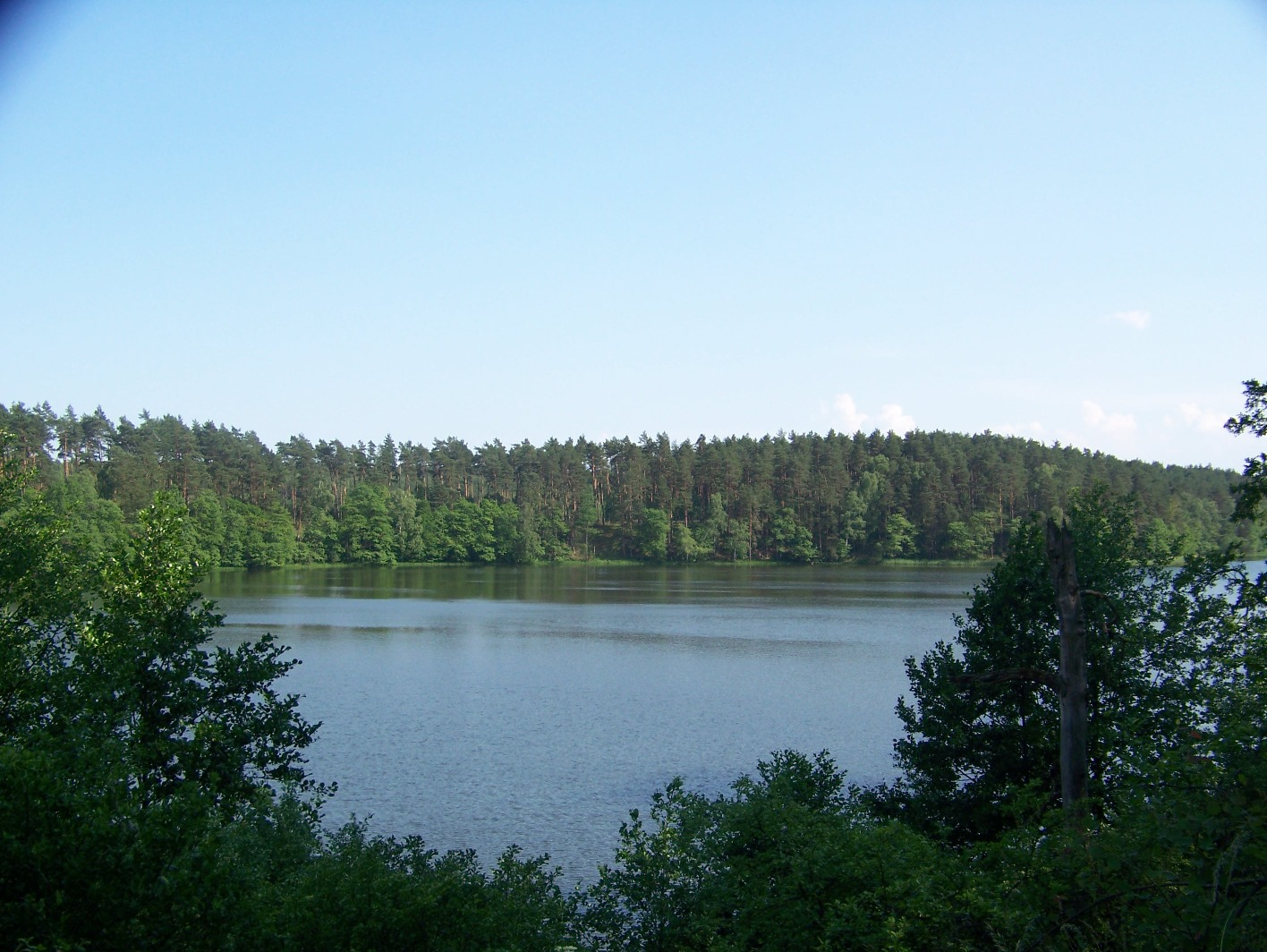
Drawa National Park

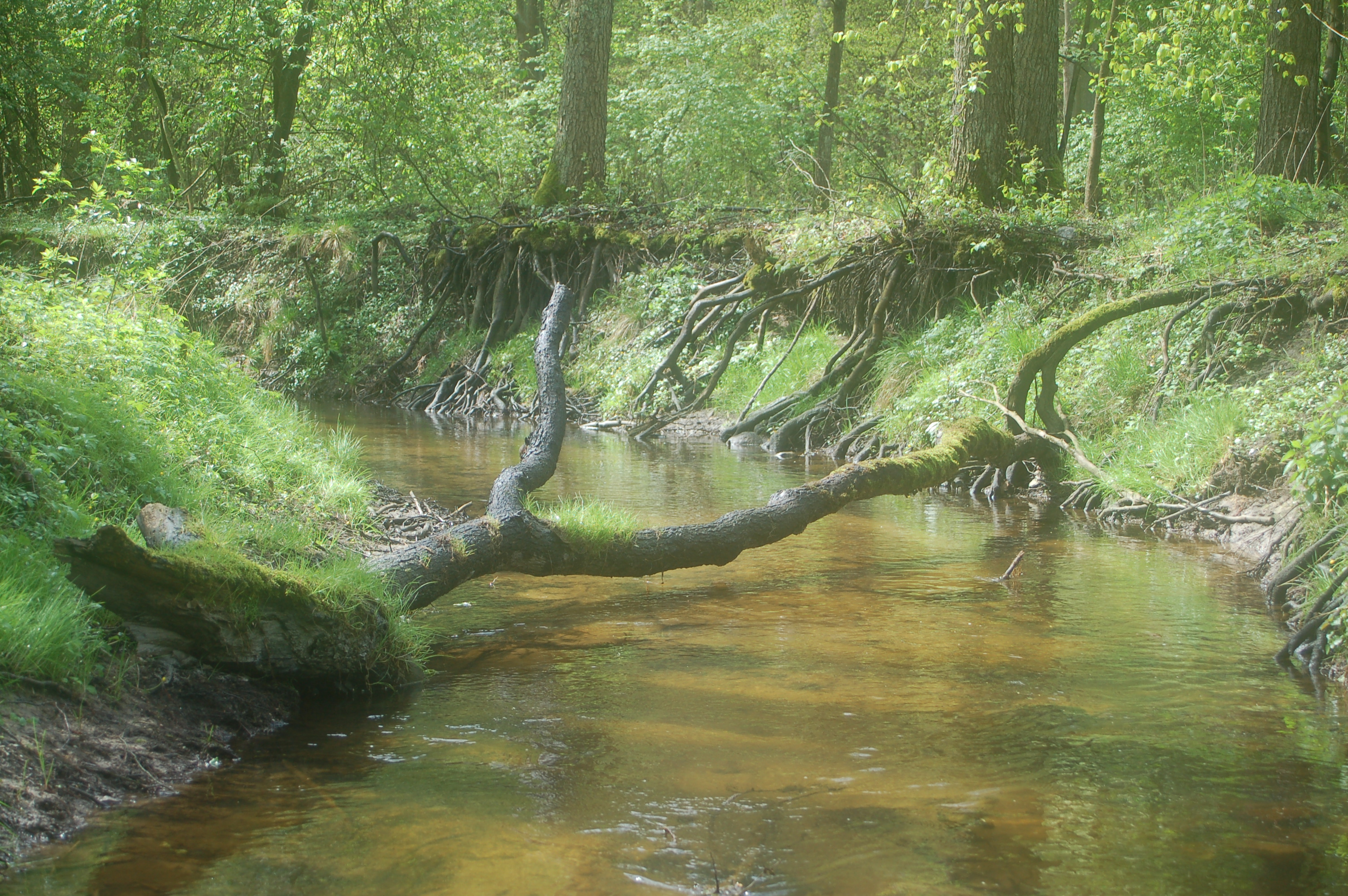
Potok Sucha, a protected nature reserve in the Szprotawa Commune

Protected areas in Lubusz Voivodeship include two national parks and eight landscape parks. These are listed below.

- Drawa National Park (partly in Greater Poland and West Pomeranian Voivodeships)
- Warta Mouth National Park
- Warta Mouth Landscape Park (partly in West Pomeranian Voivodeship)
- Barlinek-Gorzów Landscape Park (partly in West Pomeranian Voivodeship)
- Gryżyna Landscape Park
- Krzesin Landscape Park
- Łagów Landscape Park
- Muskau Bend Landscape Park (UNESCO World Heritage Site)
- Przemęt Landscape Park (partly in Greater Poland Voivodeship)
- Pszczew Landscape Park (partly in Greater Poland Voivodeship)

== Sights and tourism ==
There are seven Historic Monuments of Poland and one World Heritage Site in the voivodeship:

- Muskau Park in Łęknica (listed as both)
- Former Cistercian abbey in Gościkowo
- Church of the Visitation of Mary in Klępsk
- Former Augustinian Abbey and Assumption of the Blessed Virgin Mary Church, Żagań, one of the burial sites of the Piast dynasty
- Former sanatorium in Trzebiechów
- Piast Royal Castle in Międzyrzecz
- Sanctuary of Our Lady of Rokitno in Rokitno

Furthermore, there are several preserved old towns with historic town halls and market squares (e.g. Zielona Góra, Wschowa, Świebodzin and Bytom Odrzański). Of the historic town halls, the one in Kargowa was the site of an armed defense against the annexation by Prussia in the Second Partition of Poland in 1793. Several towns contain entirely or partly preserved medieval town walls with towers and gates, e.g. Kożuchów, Strzelce Krajeńskie, Gorzów Wielkopolski, Ośno Lubuskie, Wschowa. There are multiple castles, including Piast Royal and Ducal castles in Krosno Odrzańskie, Kożuchów, Międzyrzecz and Żagań. There are also numerous palaces, including at Brody, Dąbrówka Wielkopolska, Glisno, Jędrzychowice, Kalsk, Mierzęcin, Trzebiechów, Żary. The village of Łagów, which hosted the Knights Templar and the Sovereign Military Order of Malta in the past, contains the Castle of the Order of St. John, and several other medieval structures. Kostrzyn nad Odrą and its surroundings contain fortifications of the Kostrzyn Fortress with Fort Sarbinowo, which housed a German strict regime prisoner-of-war camp for Allied officers during World War I, considered the only German WWI POW camp from which no one managed to escape.

Major museums dedicated to the history of the region are located in Gorzów Wielkopolski and Zielona Góra. There are museums dedicated to Allied prisoners of war at the former German POW camps in Dobiegniew and Żagań. In Żagań, there is a memorial to the victims of the Stalag Luft III murders of Allied POWs, perpetrated by Nazi Germany in World War II. There are multiple other memorials to victims of Nazi Germany in the region, including at the sites of the most notorious atrocities in Międzyrzecz, Słońsk and Świecko. In Bucze there is a memorial to American airmen shot down by the Germans in 1945. The garrison town of Żagań hosts Poland's oldest monument of Wojtek, the soldier bear of the Polish II Corps.

Sława is a popular summer holiday destination in the voivodeship, due to Lake Sławskie, the largest lake of the voivodeship, with beaches, a marina, holiday resorts and the Ptasi Raj ("Bird Paradise") viewing platform, which allows visitors to observe the birdlife of the lake and its islands, home to various species of birds, part of a bird sanctuary of European importance.

Kuna, the world's oldest in service river icebreaker, is docked in the river port of Gorzów Wielkopolski and is open to the public as a museum ship.

One of the world's tallest Christ statues, the Christ the King Statue is located in Świebodzin, whereas Słubice hosts the Wikipedia Monument.

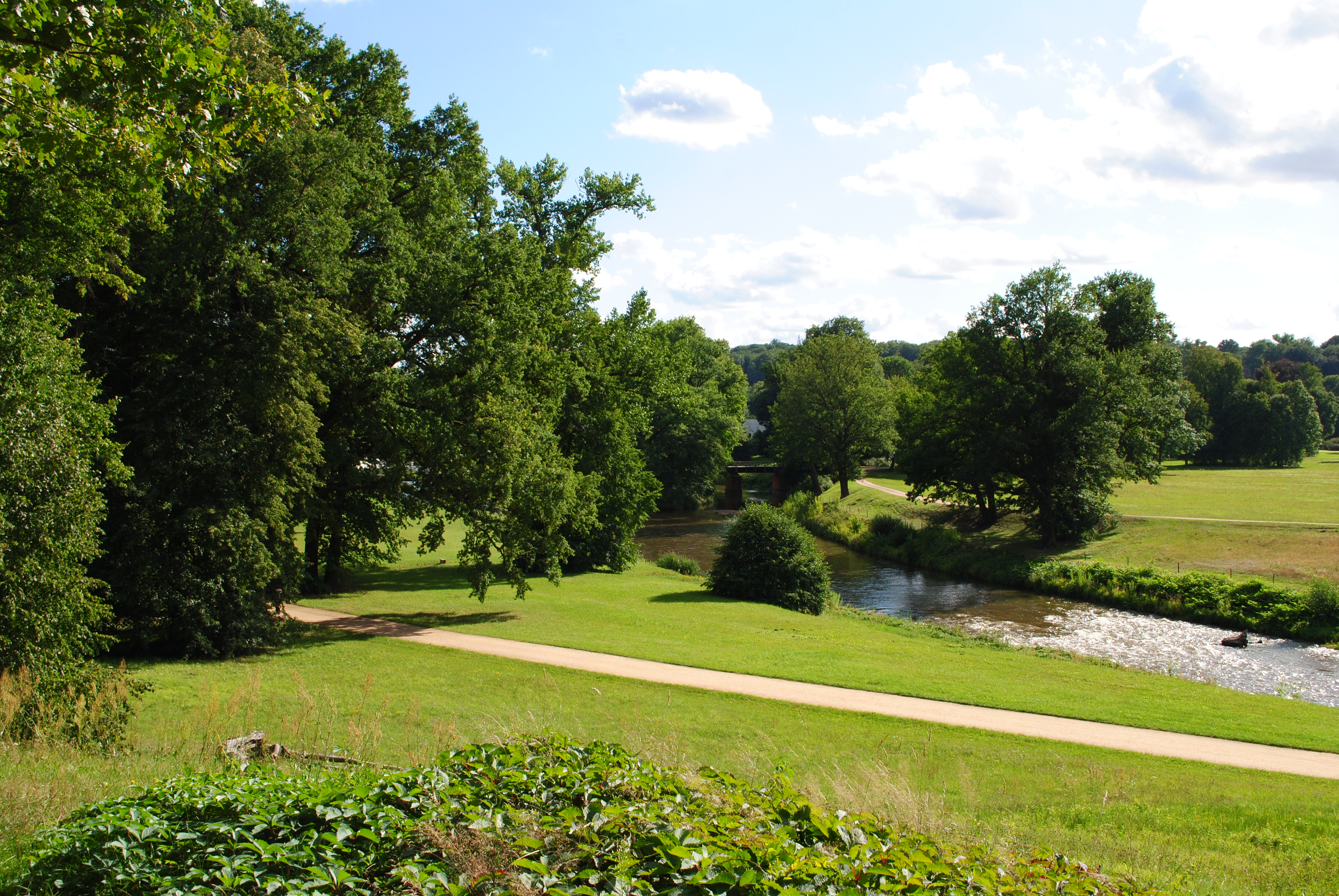
Muskau Park in Łęknica

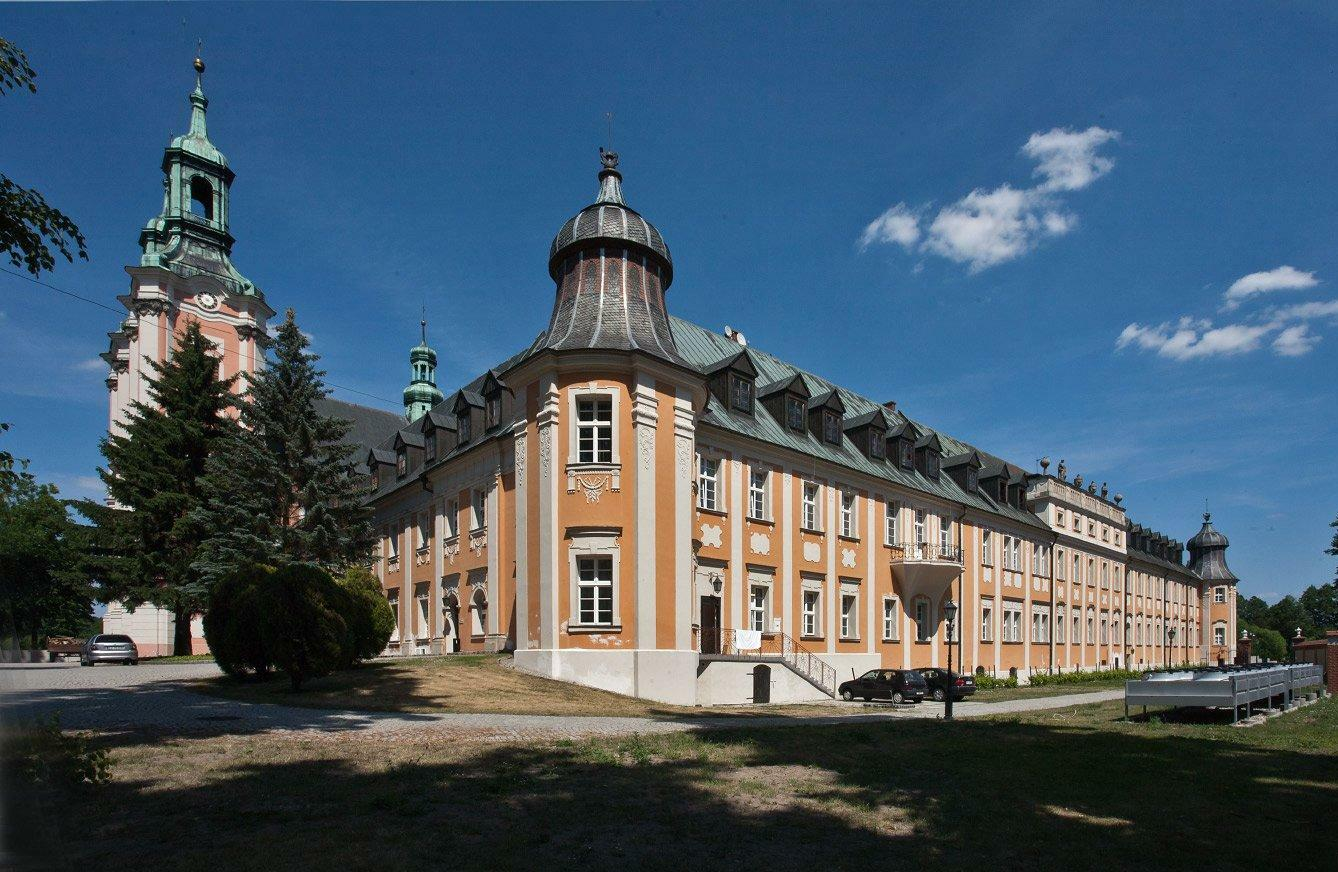
Former Cistercian abbey in Gościkowo

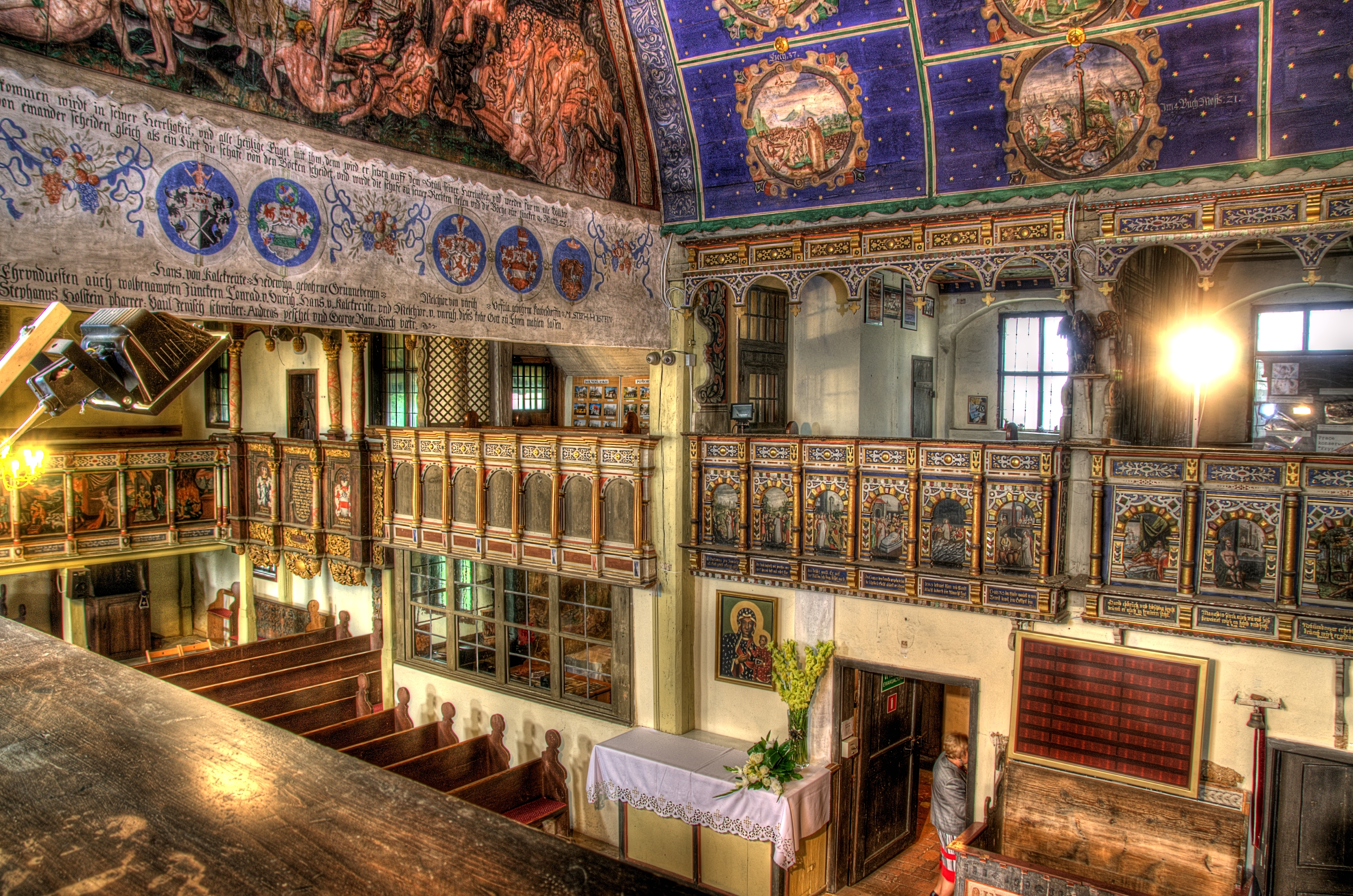
Church of the Visitation of Mary in Klępsk

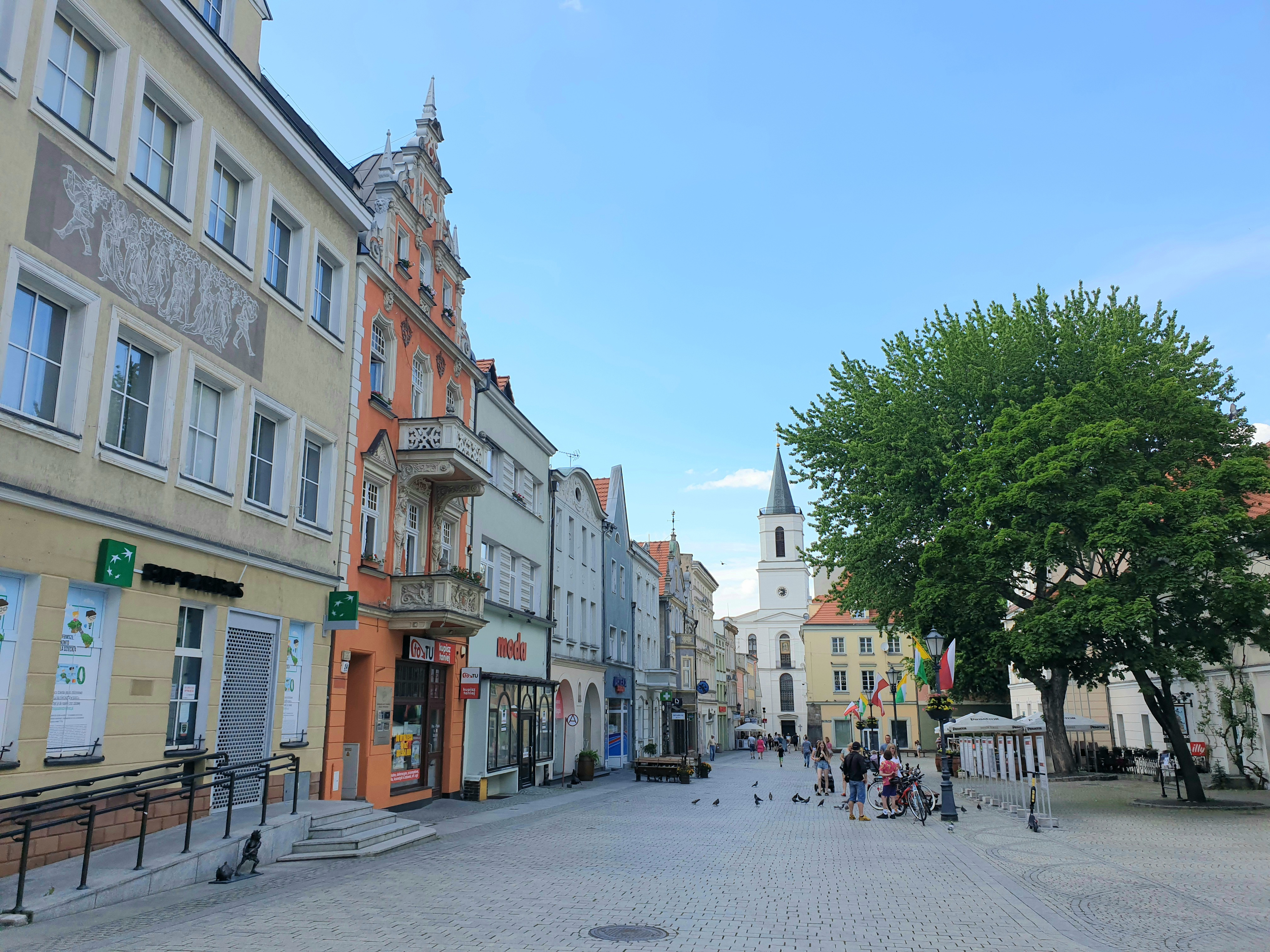
Market Square in Zielona Góra

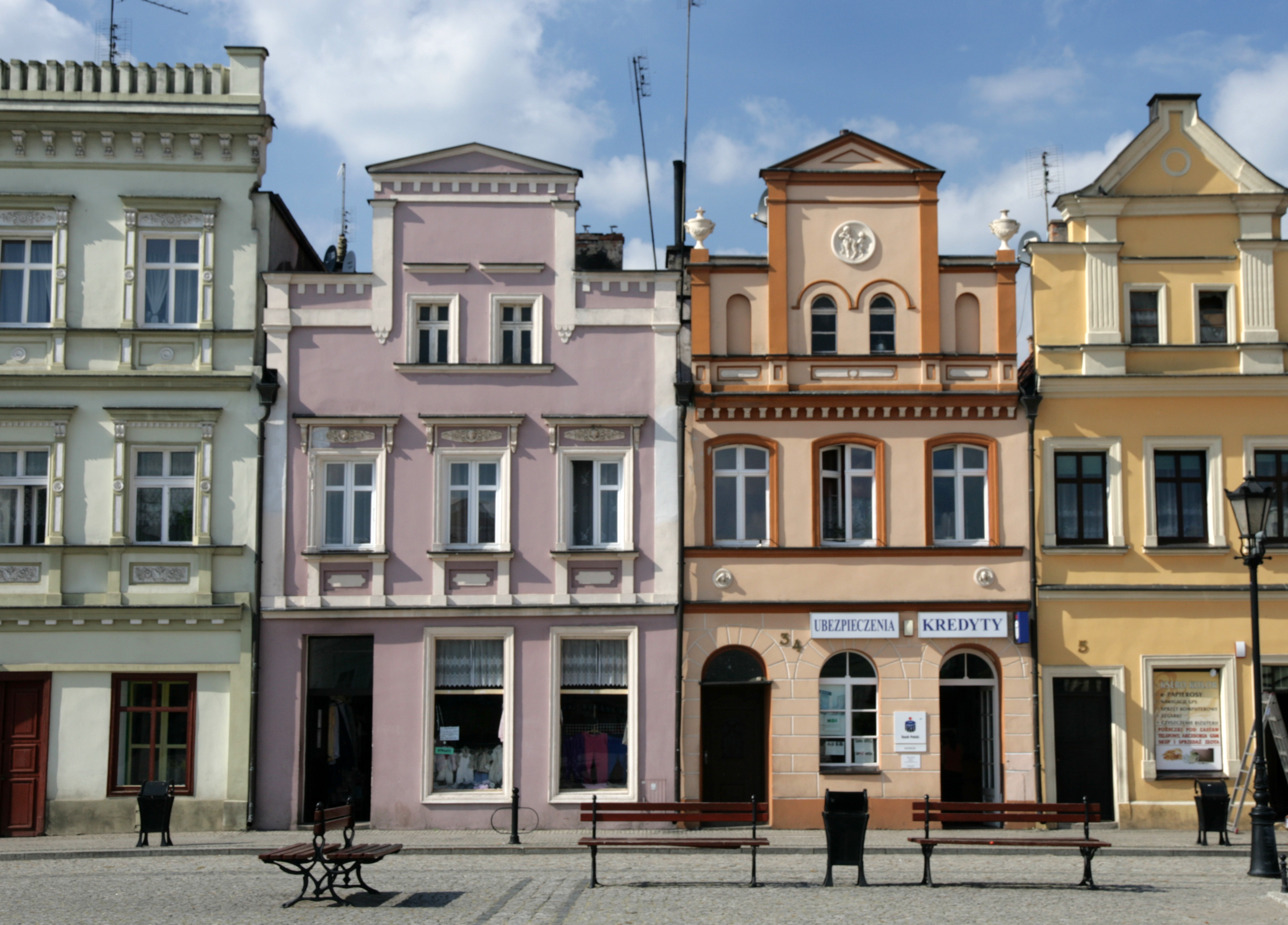
Old townhouses at the Bytom Odrzański market square

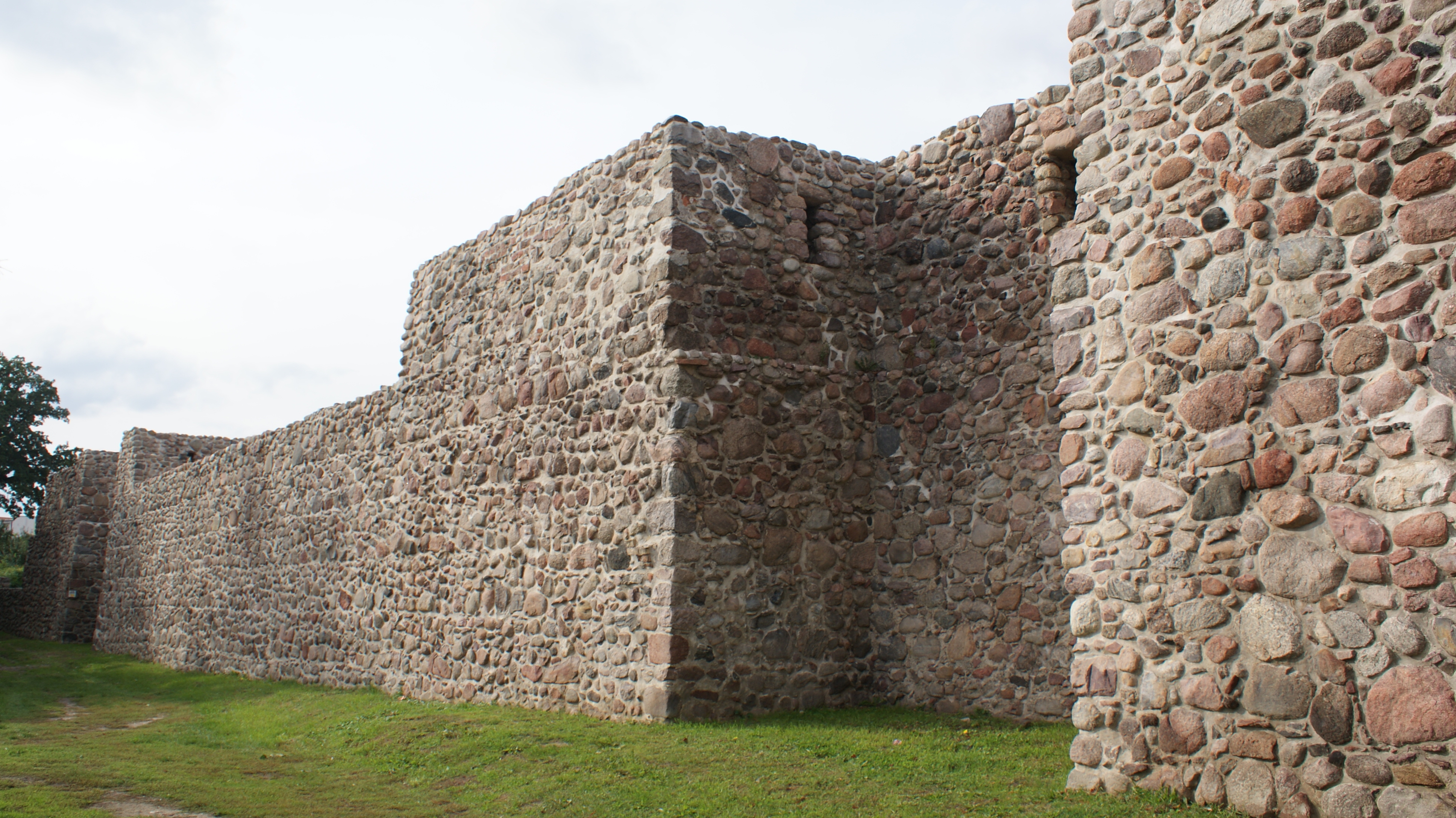
Medieval town walls of Strzelce Krajeńskie

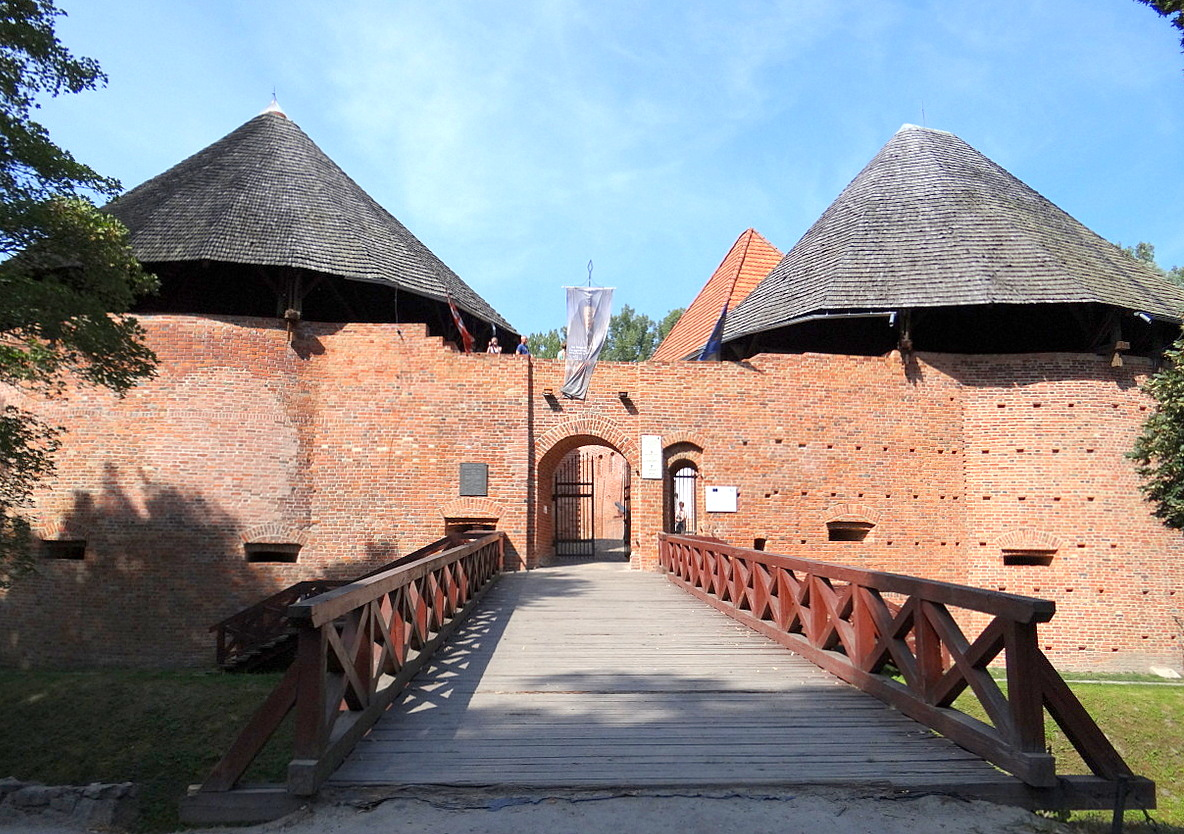
Royal Castle in Międzyrzecz

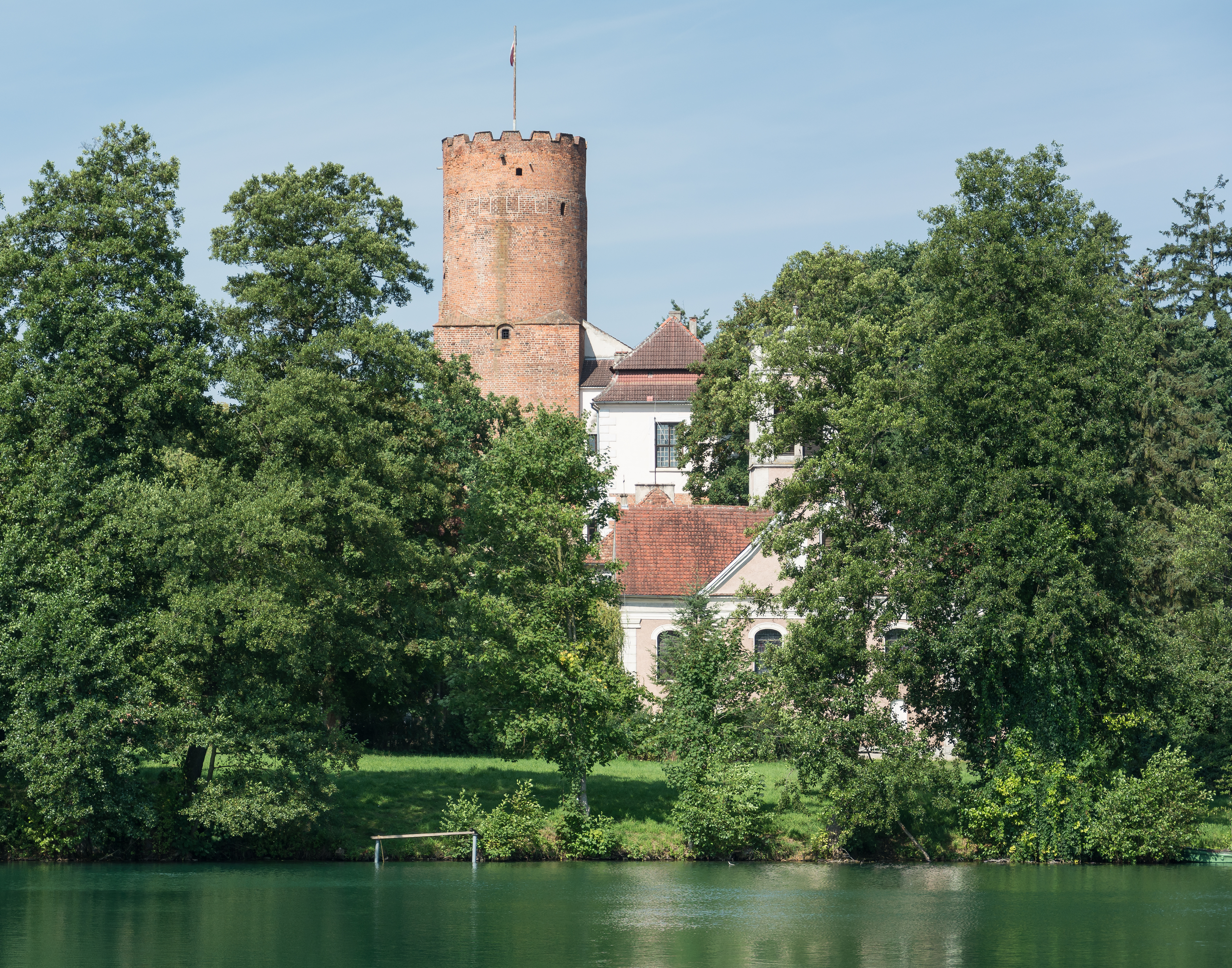
Castle of the Order of St. John in Łagów

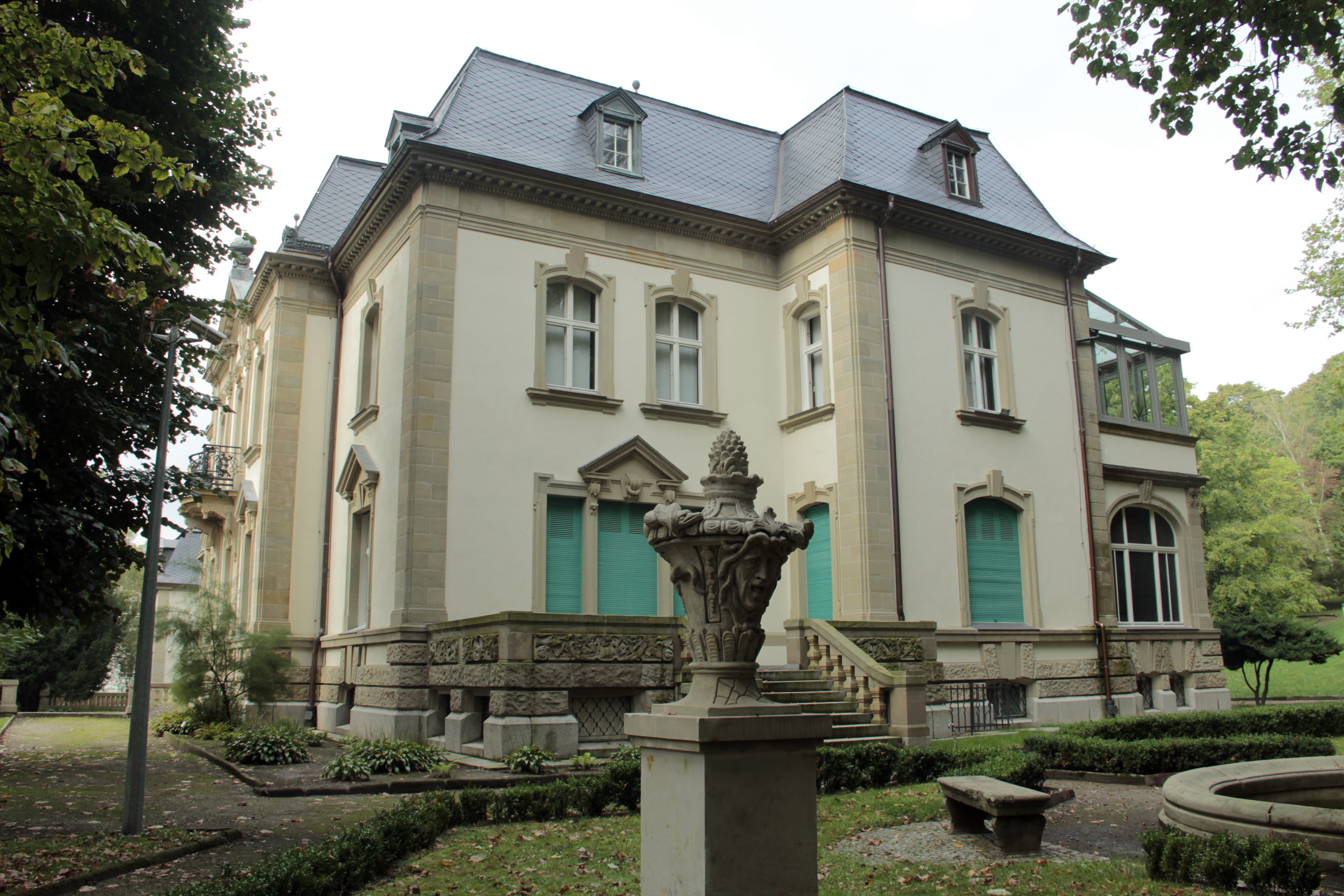
Museum of Ancient Art in Gorzów Wielkopolski

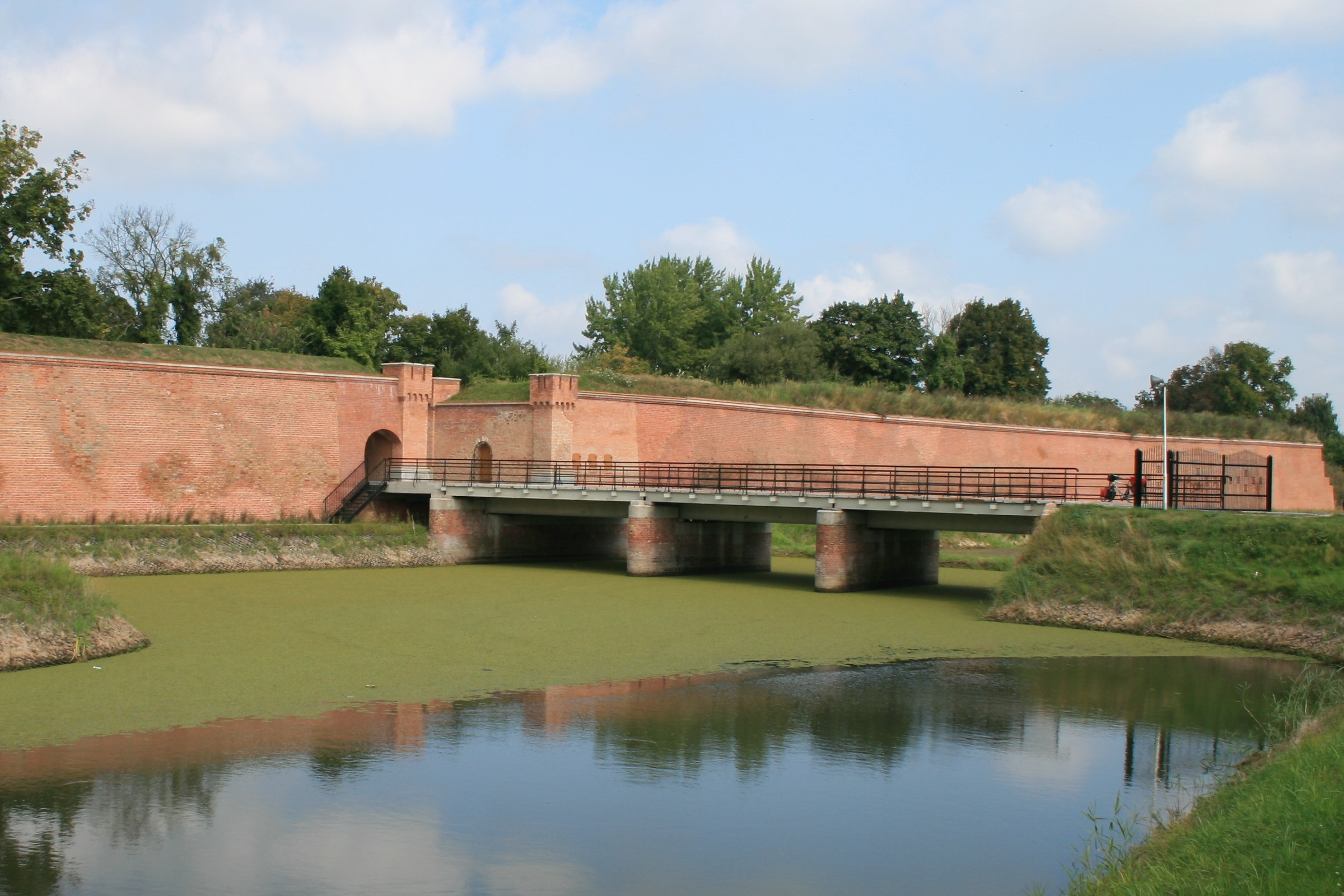
Kostrzyn Fortress in Kostrzyn nad Odrą

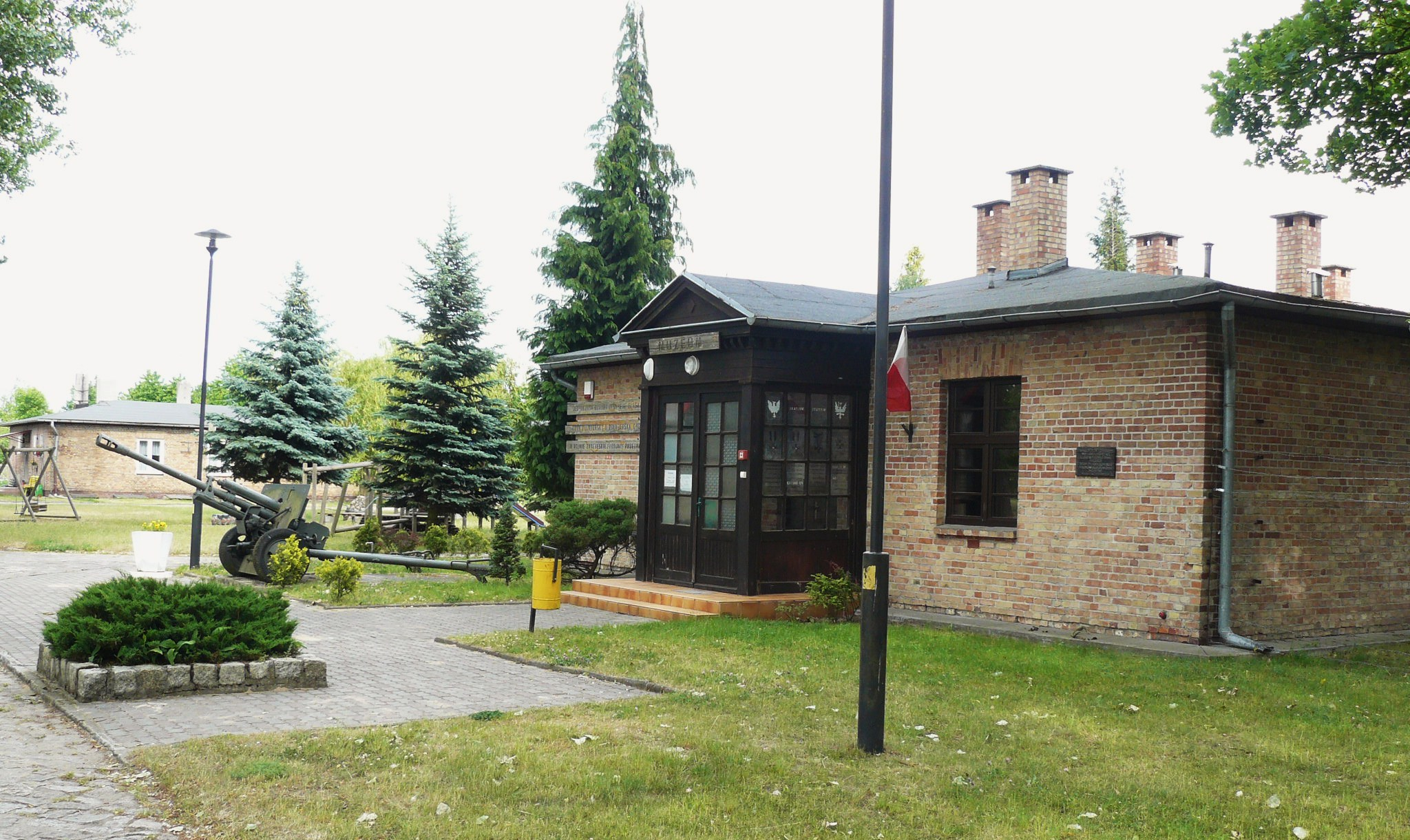
Museum at the former Oflag II-C POW camp in Dobiegniew

Stalag Luft III murders victims memorial in Żagań

== Sports ==
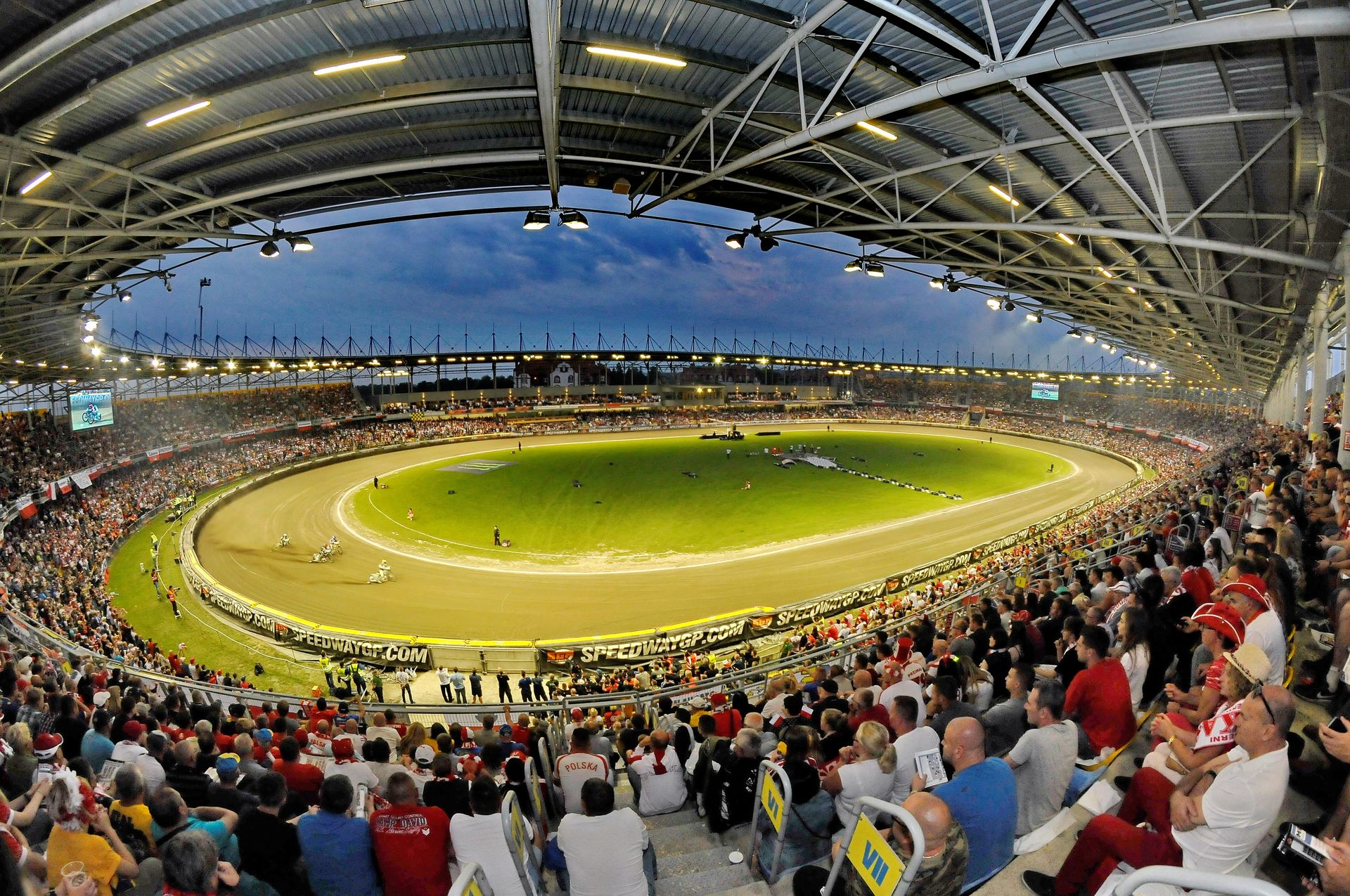
2017 Speedway Grand Prix of Poland at the Edward Jancarz Stadium in Gorzów Wielkopolski

Motorcycle speedway has a following in the province, with the Stal Gorzów Wielkopolski and Falubaz Zielona Góra clubs being among the most successful in the sport in the country. The teams contest the Lubusz Voivodeship Derby, which is a notable speedway rivalry.

Professional sports teams
Club	Sport	League	Trophies
Stal Gorzów Wielkopolski	Speedway	Ekstraliga	9 Polish Championships
Falubaz Zielona Góra	Speedway	Ekstraliga	7 Polish Championships
Zastal Zielona Góra	Basketball (men's)	Polish Basketball League	5 Polish Championships; 3 Polish Cups (2015, 2017, 2021)
AZS AJP Gorzów Wielkopolski	Basketball (women's)	Basket Liga Kobiet	1 Polish Cup (2025)
Stal Gorzów Wielkopolski	Handball (men's)	Liga Centralna (2nd tier)	0
Cuprum Stilon Gorzów	Volleyball (men's)	PlusLiga	0
Astra Nowa Sól	Volleyball (men's)	I liga (2nd tier)	0

== Education ==
The chief higher education institutions in the Lubusz Voivodeship are the University of Zielona Góra and the Jacob of Paradies University in Gorzów Wielkopolski. Gorzów is also home to the Faculty of Physical Culture in Gorzów Wielkopolski of the Poznań University of Physical Education, whereas Słubice is home to the Collegium Polonicum, a branch of the Adam Mickiewicz University in Poznań. Private colleges are the Lusatian Higher School in Żary and the Higher School of Business in Gorzów Wielkopolski.

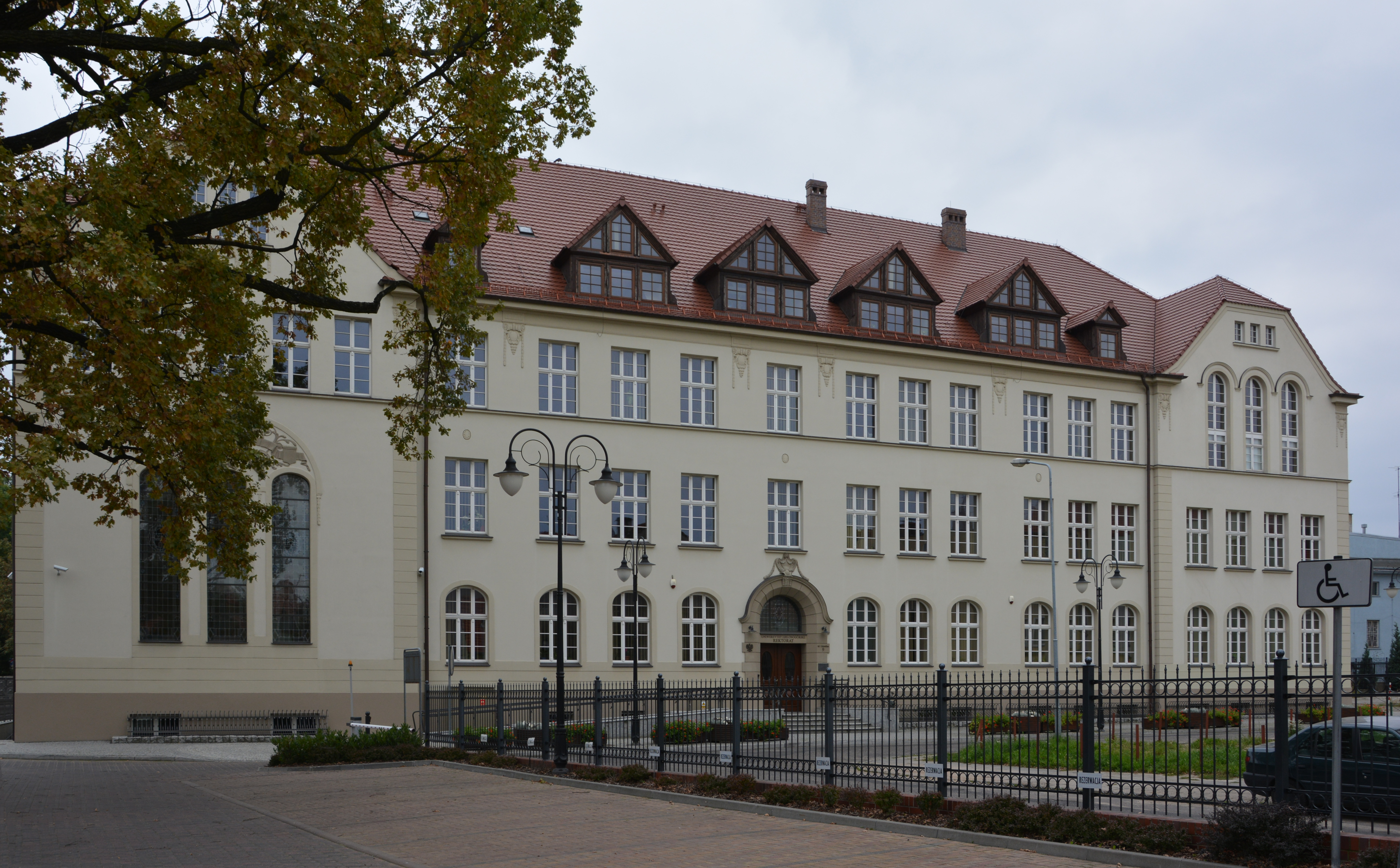
University of Zielona Góra

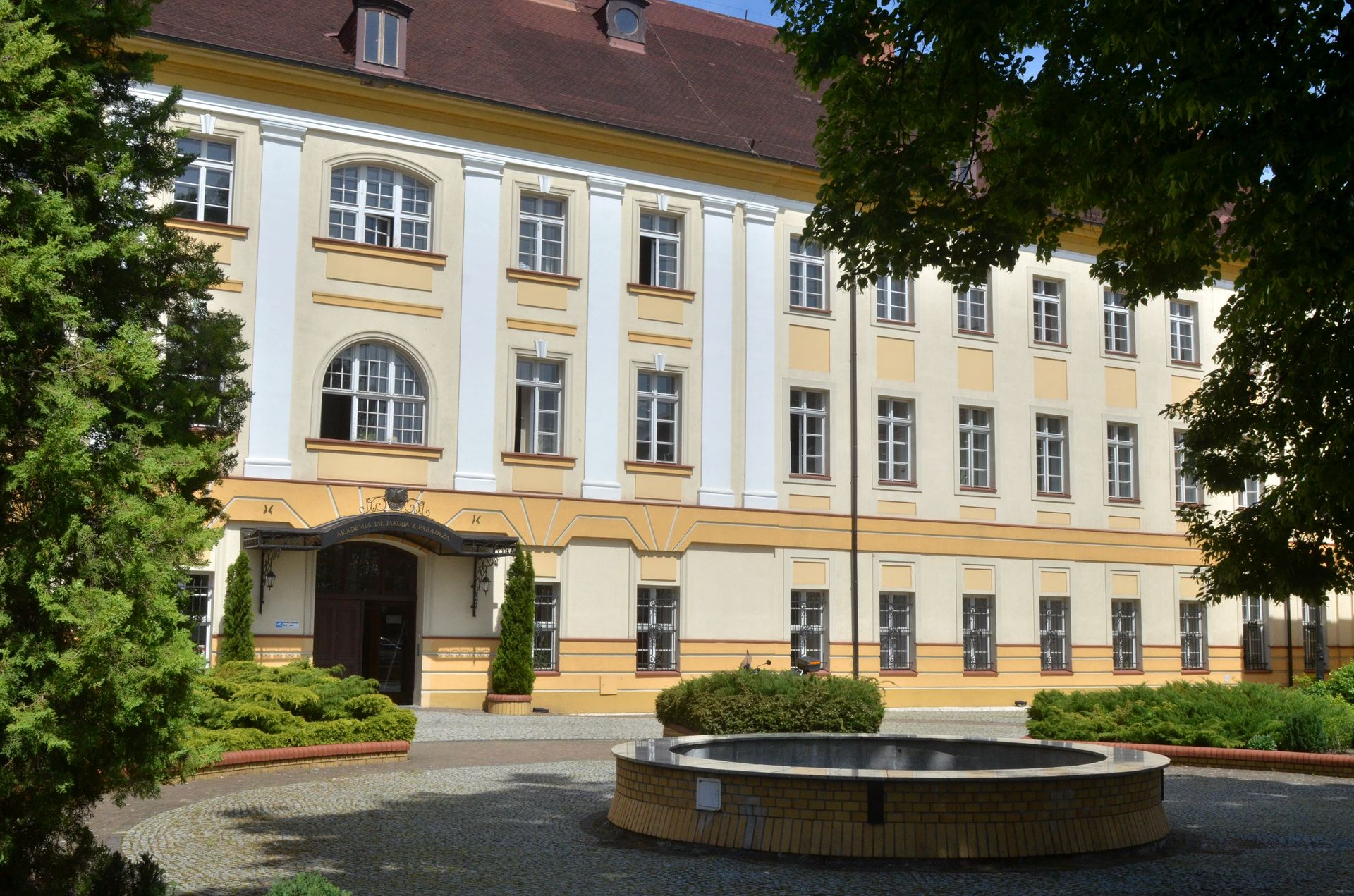
Jacob of Paradies University in Gorzów Wielkopolski

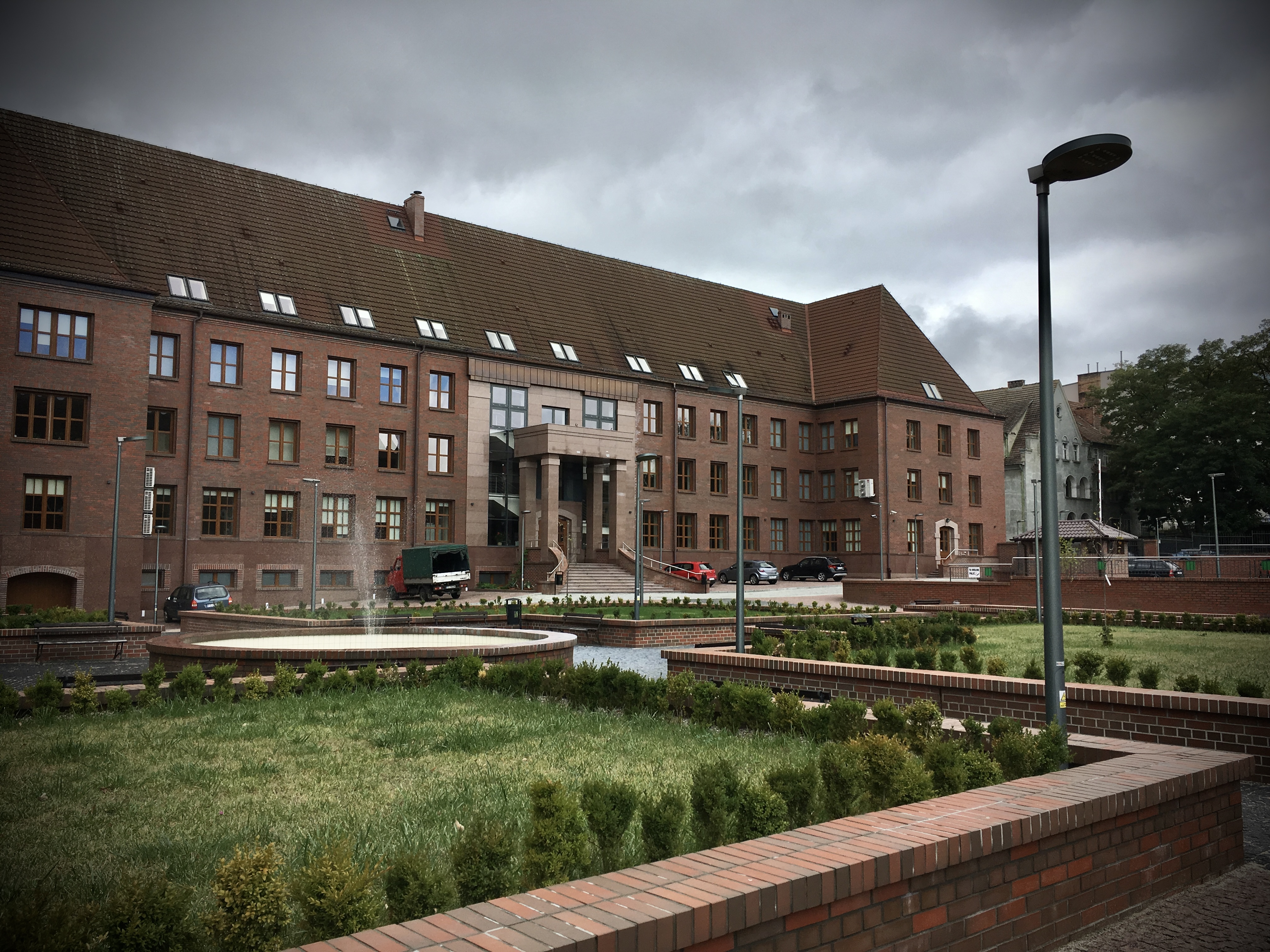
Faculty of Physical Culture in Gorzów Wielkopolski

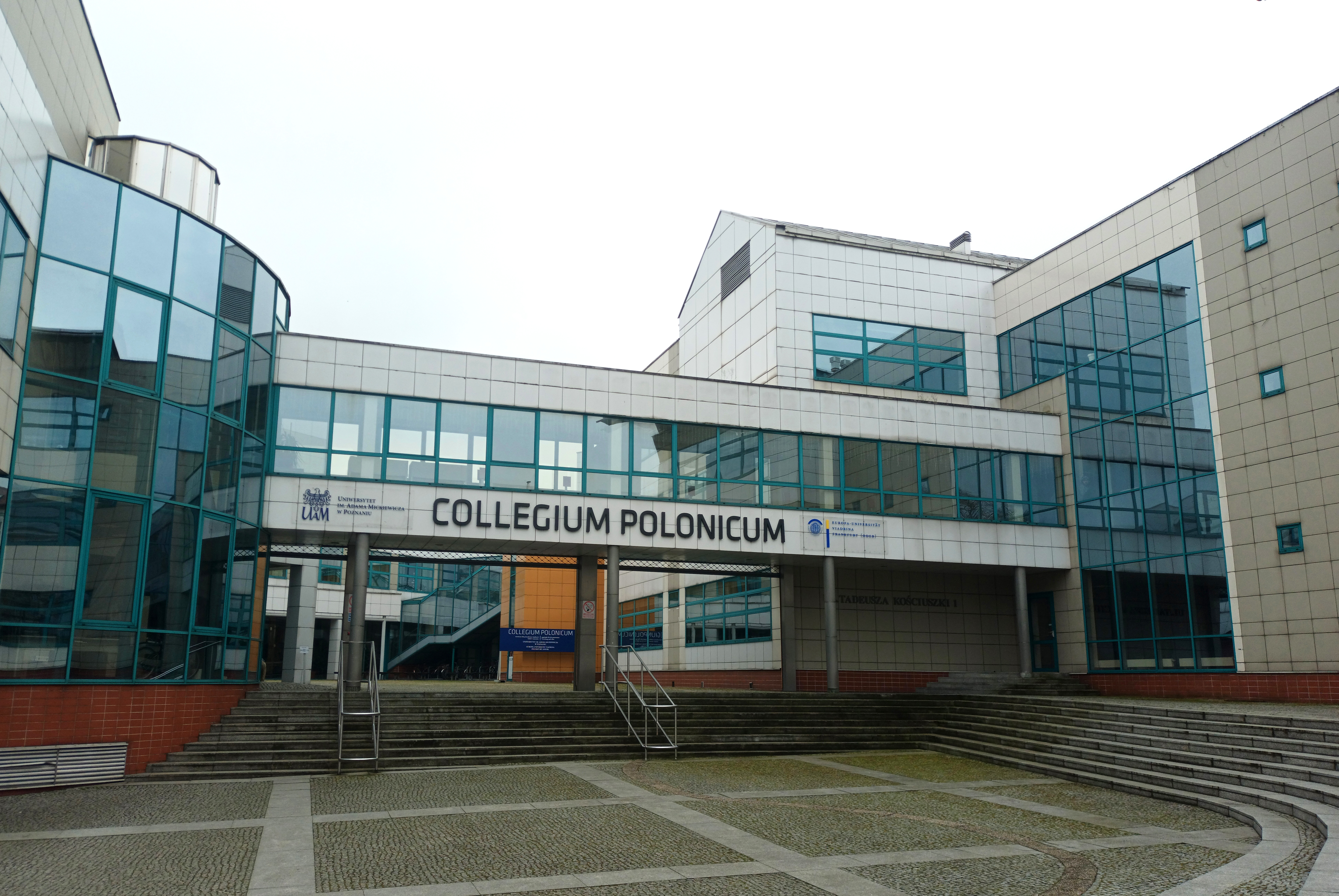
Collegium Polonicum in Słubice
