= Łagów Castle =

Castle of the Order of St. John in Łagów
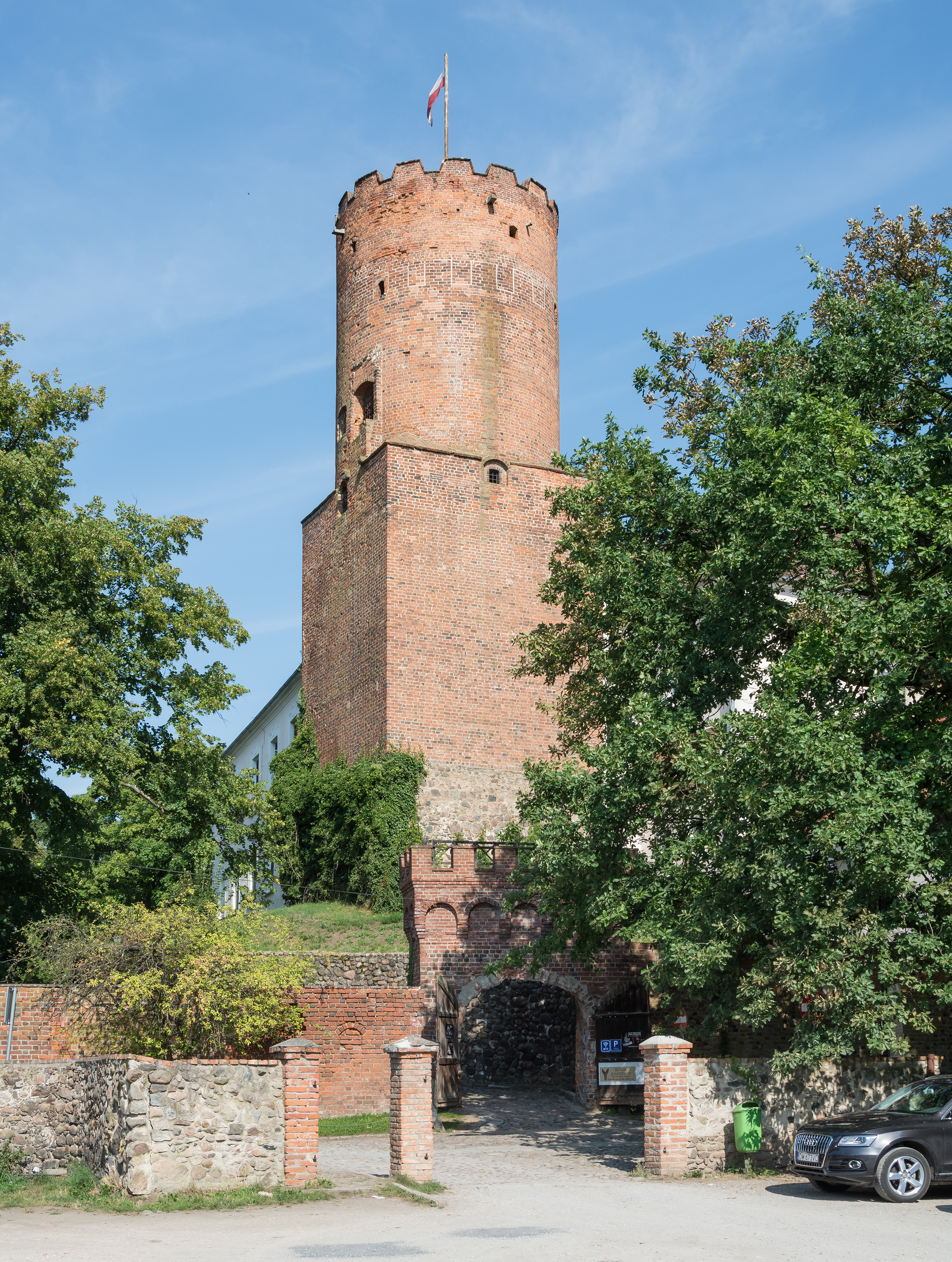
- Castle of the Order of St. John in Łagów

- Location of the Castle of the Order of St. John in Poland
- 52°20′05″N 15°17′31″E
- Location: Łagów, Lubusz Voivodeship, in Poland

History
- Built: Second half of the fourteenth century

Site notes
- Architectural styles: Gothic; Renaissance; Baroque

Castle of the Order of St. John - a castle located in the village of Łagów (56 km south of Gorzów Wielkopolski), Lubusz Voivodeship; in Poland. The castle is located on a peninsula between the Łagowski and Ciesz Lakes.

== History ==
The first mention of the castle was under the name of castro Lagowe in 1299. The castle was built by the Order of St. John, and in later years fortified in a trapezium-like shape. In the eighteenth century the residence was reconstructed in the Baroque architectural style. In 1812, after the secularisation of the Order of St. John, the castle went into private hands. Currently, the castle houses a hotel.
