= Bucze, Świebodzin County =

Bucze
- Village
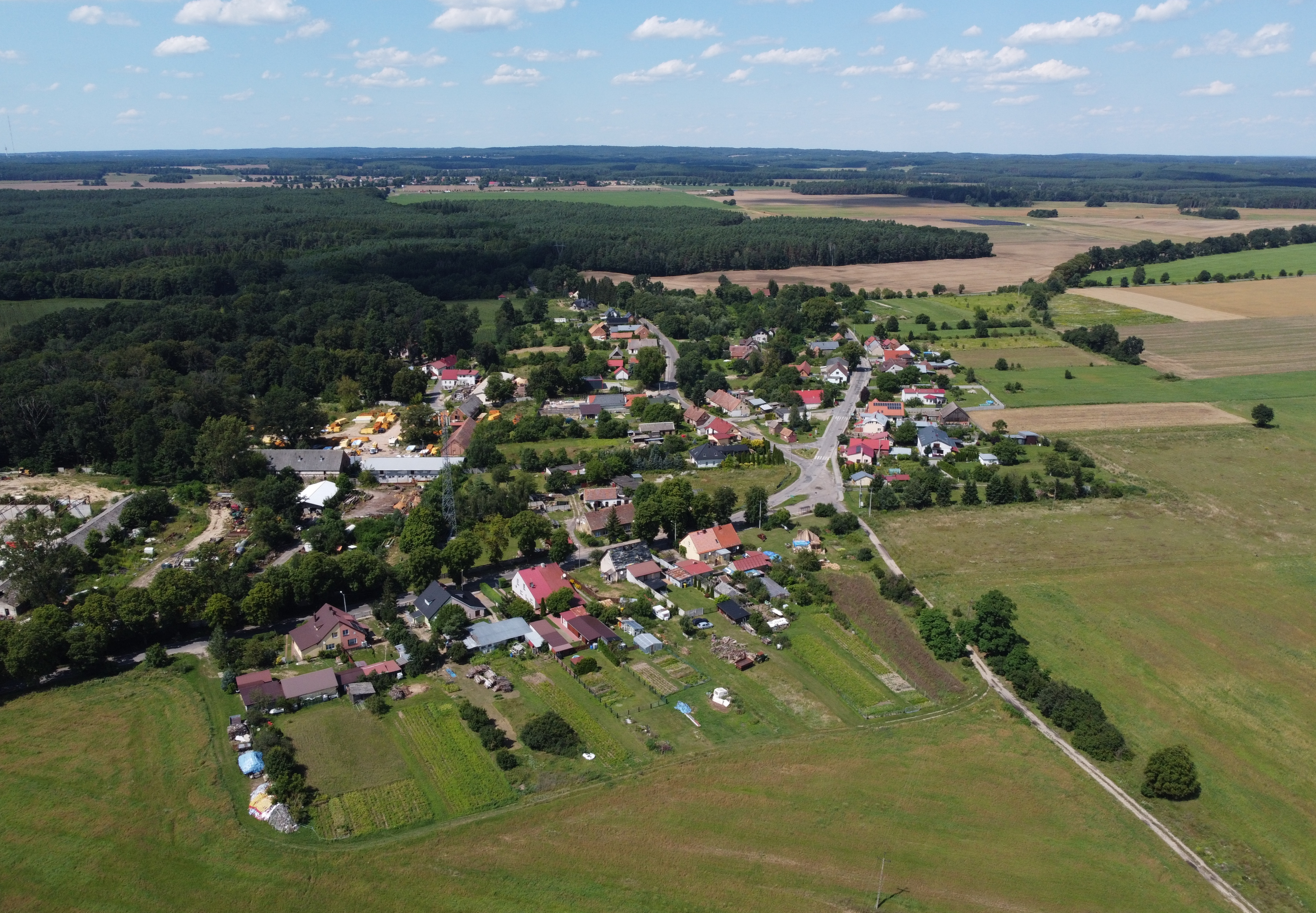

- Location within Poland
- Coordinates: 52°17′22″N 15°22′8″E
- Country: Poland
- Voivodeship: Lubusz
- County: Świebodzin
- Gmina: Lubrza

Population
  - Total: 280
- Time zone: UTC+1 (CET)
  - Summer (DST): UTC+2 (CEST)
- Vehicle registration: FSW

Bucze [ˈbut͡ʂɛ] is a village in the administrative district of Gmina Lubrza, within Świebodzin County, Lubusz Voivodeship, in western Poland.

== History ==
During World War II, Nazi Germany operated a forced labour camp for Jewish men in the village. During the final stages of the war, on 18 March 1945, German anti-aircraft artillery shot down an American bomber, killing four men, Richard C. Berryman, Norman B. Dahlin, Leslie C. Chavet, Michael J. Jr. Riley. There is a memorial at the site.
