= Łagów, Świebodzin County =

Łagów
- Village
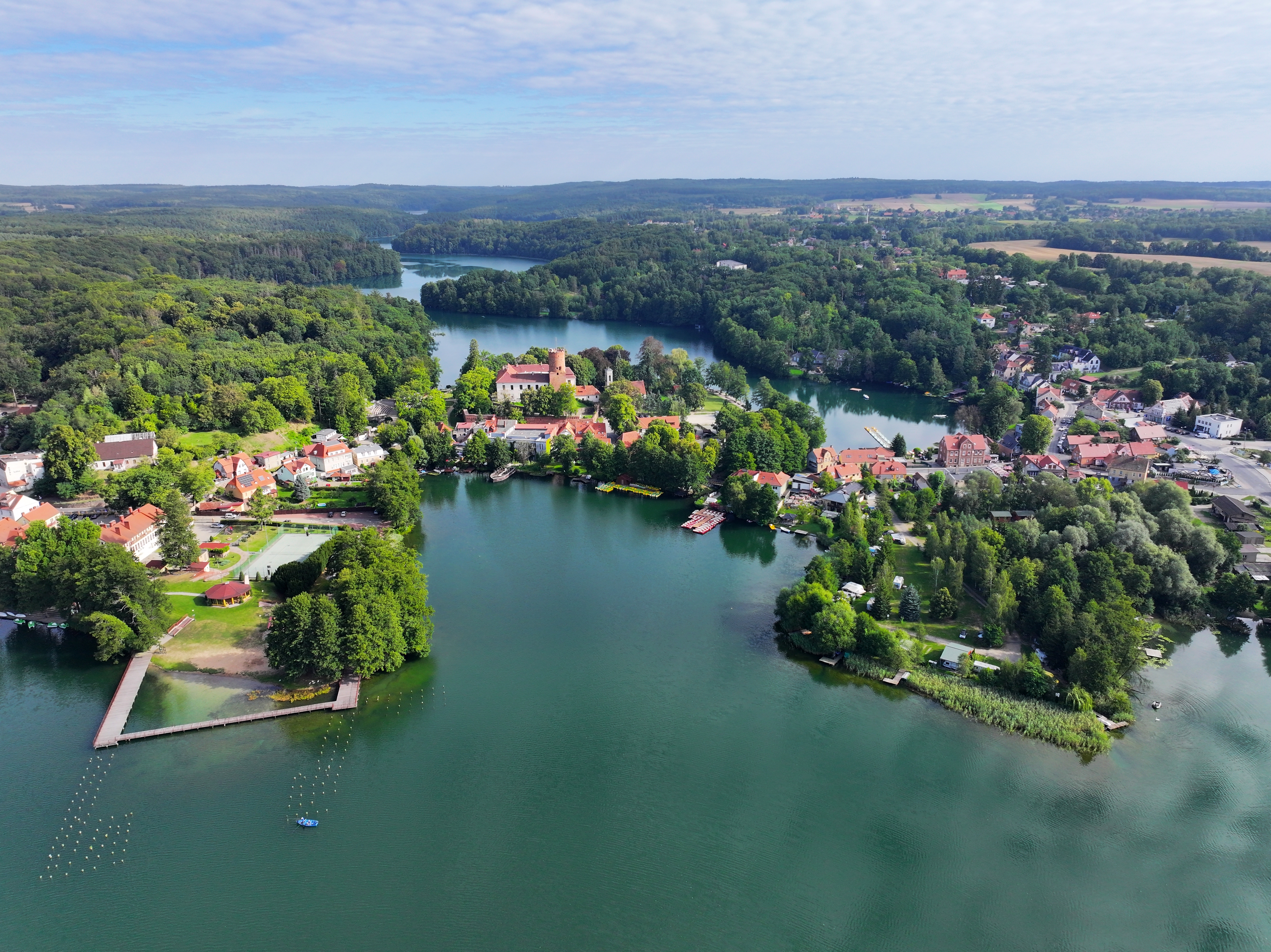
- Aerial view of Łagów

- Flag
- Motto: Perła Ziemi Lubuskiej; Pearl of Lubusz Land
- Location within Poland
- Coordinates: 52°20′N 15°18′E
- Country: Poland
- Voivodeship: Lubusz
- County: Świebodzin
- Gmina: Łagów
- Established: 13th century
- City rights: 1727-1932

Population (2006)
  - Total: 1,600
- Time zone: UTC+1 (CET)
  - Summer (DST): UTC+2 (CEST)
- Postal code: 66-220
- Area code: +48 68
- Car plates: FSW
- Website: www.lagow.pl

Łagów ([ˈwaɡuf]; German: Lagow) is a village in Świebodzin County, Lubusz Voivodeship, in western Poland. It is the seat of the gmina (administrative district) called Gmina Łagów. It is located in the historic Lubusz Land.

The oldest part of the village is situated on an isthmus between two lakes of the Łagowskie Lake District: Trześniowskie (186 ha) and Łagowski (82 ha). There is a Knights Hospitaller castle in Łagów, the Castle of the Order of St. John. The village gives its name to a protected area called Łagów Landscape Park.

== Notable people ==
- Gerhard Domagk, German pathologist and bacteriologist, Nobel Prize laureate
