= List of German names for places in Poland =

Below are links to subpages listing German language names of towns and villages in different regions of Poland. Due to the country's history, many of those names have been in actual use locally, and are thus not exonyms.

== Sublists by provinces ==
- Greater Poland Voivodeship
- Kuyavian-Pomeranian Voivodeship
- Lower Silesian Voivodeship
- Lubusz Voivodeship
- Opole Voivodeship
- Pomeranian Voivodeship
- Silesian Voivodeship
- Warmian-Masurian Voivodeship
- West Pomeranian Voivodeship

== Complete list ==
=== Cities, towns, villages, neighborhoods and regions ===
Polish name	Gmina	County	Voivodeship	German name
Babimost	Babimost	Zielona Góra	Lubusz Voivodeship	Bomst
Barciany	Barciany	Kętrzyn	Warmian-Masurian Voivodeship	Barten
Barczewo	Barczewo	Olsztyn	Warmian-Masurian Voivodeship	Wartenburg
Barlinek	Barlinek	Myślibórz	West Pomeranian Voivodeship	Berlinchen
Bartoszyce		Bartoszyce	Warmian-Masurian Voivodeship	Bartenstein
Barwice	Barwice	Szczecinek	West Pomeranian Voivodeship	Bärwalde
Biała, Opole Voivodeship	Biała	Prudnik	Opole Voivodeship	Zülz
Biała Piska	Biała Piska	Pisz	Warmian-Masurian Voivodeship	Bialla
Biała Piska	Biała Piska	Pisz	Warmian-Masurian Voivodeship	Gehlenburg (Note: Used from 1938 until 1945.)
Białogard		Białogard	West Pomeranian Voivodeship	Belgard
Biały Bór	Biały Bór	Szczecinek	West Pomeranian Voivodeship	Baldenburg
Biecz, Lubusz Voivodeship	Brody	Żary	Lubusz Voivodeship	Biet(z)sch
Bielawa		Dzierżoniów	Lower Silesian Voivodeship	Langenbielau
Bielsko				Bielitz (Note: Part of Bielsko-Biała.)
Bierutów	Bierutów	Oleśnica	Lower Silesian Voivodeship	Bernstadt an der Weide
Bieżyce	Gubin	Krosno	Lubusz Voivodeship	Groß Bösitz
Biskupiec	Biskupiec	Olsztyn	Warmian-Masurian Voivodeship	Bischofsburg
Bisztynek	Bisztynek	Bartoszyce	Warmian-Masurian Voivodeship	Bischofstein
Bobolice	Bobolice	Koszalin	West Pomeranian Voivodeship	Bublitz
Bobowicko	Międzyrzecz	Międzyrzecz	Lubusz Voivodeship	Bobelwitz
Boczów, Lubusz Voivodeship	Torzym	Sulęcin	Lubusz Voivodeship	Bottschow
Bogatynia	Bogatynia	Zgorzelec	Lower Silesian Voivodeship	Reichenau
Boguszów-Gorce		Wałbrzych	Lower Silesian Voivodeship	Gottesberg-Rothenbach
Bolesławiec		Bolesławiec	Lower Silesian Voivodeship	Bunzlau
Boręty	Lichnowy	Malbork	Pomeranian Voivodeship	Barendt
Borne Sulinowo	Borne Sulinowo	Szczecinek	West Pomeranian Voivodeship	Groß-Born
Borów, Lubusz Voivodeship	Świebodzin	Świebodzin	Lubusz Voivodeship	Birkholz
Borowe, Lubusz Voivodeship	Iłowa	Żagań	Lubusz Voivodeship	Burau
Braniewo		Braniewo	Warmian-Masurian Voivodeship	Braunsberg
Brodnica		Brodnica	Kuyavian-Pomeranian Voivodeship	Strasburg an der Drewenz
Brodnica		Brodnica	Kuyavian-Pomeranian Voivodeship	Strasburg in Westpreußen
Brodziszów	Ząbkowice Śląskie	Ząbkowice	Lower Silesian Voivodeship	Dittmannsdorf
Brokęcino	Okonek	Złotów	Greater Poland Voivodeship	Bahrenbusch
Brójce, Lubusz Voivodeship	Trzciel	Międzyrzecz	Lubusz Voivodeship	Brätz
Brożek, Lubusz Voivodeship				Forst-Scheuno
Brzeg		Brzeg	Opole Voivodeship	Brieg
Brześć Kujawski	Brześć Kujawski	Włocławek	Kuyavian-Pomeranian Voivodeship	Brest
Brześć Kujawski	Brześć Kujawski	Włocławek	Kuyavian-Pomeranian Voivodeship	Kujawisch Brest
Brzeżno	Brzeżno	Świdwin	West Pomeranian Voivodeship	Briesen
Brzoza, Lubusz Voivodeship	Strzelce Krajeńskie	Strzelce-Drezdenko	Lubusz Voivodeship	Birkholz
Brzózka, Lubusz Voivodeship	Krosno Odrzańskie	Krosno	Lubusz Voivodeship	Braschen
Brzozowy Ług	Międzyrzecz	Międzyrzecz	Lubusz Voivodeship	Johanneshof
Budziechów	Jasień	Żary	Lubusz Voivodeship	Baudach
Bukowiec, Lubusz Voivodeship	Międzyrzecz	Międzyrzecz	Lubusz Voivodeship	Bauchwitz
Bukówka, Lower Silesian Voivodeship	Lubawka	Kamienna Góra	Lower Silesian Voivodeship	Buchwald
Bydgoszcz			Kuyavian-Pomeranian Voivodeship	Bromberg
Buszów, Strzelce-Drezdenko County	Strzelce Krajeńskie	Strzelce-Drezdenko	Lubusz Voivodeship	Büssow
Bytom			Silesian Voivodeship	Beuthen in Oberschlesien
Bytom Odrzański	Bytom Odrzański	Nowa Sól	Lubusz Voivodeship	Beuthen an der Oder
Cedynia	Cedynia	Gryfino	West Pomeranian Voivodeship	Zehden
Chichy	Małomice	Żagań	Lubusz Voivodeship	Kunzendorf
Chełmno		Chełmno	Kuyavian-Pomeranian Voivodeship	Kulm
Chełmża		Toruń	Kuyavian-Pomeranian Voivodeship	Kulmsee
Chlebowo, Lubusz Voivodeship	Gubin	Krosno	Lubusz Voivodeship	Niemaschkleba
Chociule	Świebodzin	Świebodzin	Lubusz Voivodeship	Kutschlau
Chociwel	Chociwel	Stargard	West Pomeranian Voivodeship	Freienwalde in Pommern
Chodzież		Chodzież	Greater Poland Voivodeship	Chodziesen
Chodzież		Chodzież	Greater Poland Voivodeship	Kolmar in Posen
Chojna	Chojna	Gryfino	West Pomeranian Voivodeship	Königsberg in der Neumark
Chorzów			Silesian Voivodeship	Königshütte
Choszczno	Choszczno	Choszczno	West Pomeranian Voivodeship	Arnswalde
Chrzanów	Gmina Chrzanów	Chrzanów	Lesser Poland Voivodeship	Krenau (Note: Used from 1941 until 1945.)
Chwaliszowice	Trzebiel	Żary	Lubusz Voivodeship	Quolsdorf
Ciechocinek		Aleksandrów	Kuyavian-Pomeranian Voivodeship	Hermannsbad
Cieszyn		Cieszyn	Silesian Voivodeship	Teschen
Cieszyno, Łobez County	Węgorzyno	Łobez	West Pomeranian Voivodeship	Teschendorf
Cisów, Lubusz Voivodeship	Kożuchów	Nowa Sól	Lubusz Voivodeship	Zissendorf
Cybinka	Cybinka	Słubice	Lubusz Voivodeship	Ziebingen
Czaplinek	Czaplinek	Drawsko	West Pomeranian Voivodeship	Tempelburg
Czarnków		Czarnków-Trzcianka	Greater Poland Voivodeship	Czarniakau
Czarnków		Czarnków-Trzcianka	Greater Poland Voivodeship	Scharnikau
Czarnogoździce	Krośnice	Milicz	Lower Silesian Voivodeship	Zwornogoschütz
Czarnogoździce	Krośnice	Milicz	Lower Silesian Voivodeship	Hohenwarte (Schlesien) (Note: Used from 1936 until 1947.)
Czarnożyły	Czarnożyły	Wieluń	Łódź Voivodeship	Czarnozyly
Czarnożyły	Czarnożyły	Wieluń	Łódź Voivodeship	Schwarzgrund (Note: Used from 1943 until 1945.)
Czatkowy	Tczew	Tczew	Pomeranian Voivodeship	Schattkau
Czciradz	Kożuchów	Nowa Sól	Lubusz Voivodeship	Zyrus
Czernina, Lower Silesian Voivodeship	Góra	Góra	Lower Silesian Voivodeship	Tschirnau
Czernina, Lower Silesian Voivodeship	Góra	Góra	Lower Silesian Voivodeship	Lesten (Note: Used from 1937 until 1945.)
Czernikowo	Czernikowo	Toruń	Kuyavian-Pomeranian Voivodeship	Schwarzendorf
Czerwieńsk	Czerwieńsk	Zielona Góra	Lubusz Voivodeship	Rothenburg an der Oder
Częstochowa			Silesian Voivodeship	Tschenstochau
Człopa	Człopa	Wałcz	West Pomeranian Voivodeship	Schloppe
Dąbroszyn, Lubusz Voivodeship	Witnica	Gorzów	Lubusz Voivodeship	Tamsel
Dąbrówka Tczewska	Tczew	Tczew	Pomeranian Voivodeship	Damerau
Dąbrówka Wielkopolska	Zbąszynek	Świebodzin	Lubusz Voivodeship	Groß Dammer
Dąbrówno	Dąbrówno	Ostróda	Warmian-Masurian Voivodeship	Gilgenburg
Darłowo		Sławno	West Pomeranian Voivodeship	Rügenwalde
Darłówko				Rügenwaldermünde
Datyń	Brody	Żary	Lubusz Voivodeship	Datten
Dębno	Dębno	Myślibórz	West Pomeranian Voivodeship	Neudamm
Dębowa Łęka	Wschowa	Wschowa	Lubusz Voivodeship	Geyersdorf
Długoszyn	Sulęcin	Sulęcin	Lubusz Voivodeship	Langenfeld
Dobra, Opole Voivodeship	Strzeleczki	Krapkowice	Opole Voivodeship	Dobrau
Dobre Miasto	Dobre Miasto	Olsztyn	Warmian-Masurian Voivodeship	Guttstadt (Note: Founded with a German name.)
Dobrodzień	Dobrodzień	Olesno	Opole Voivodeship	Guttentag
Dobrzany	Dobrzany	Stargard	West Pomeranian Voivodeship	Jascobshagen
Dobiegniew	Dobiegniew	Strzelce-Drezdenko	Lubusz Voivodeship	Woldenberg
Dolna Grupa	Dragacz	Świecie	Kuyavian-Pomeranian Voivodeship	Nieder Gruppe
Drawno	Drawno	Choszczno	West Pomeranian Voivodeship	Neuwedell
Drawsko Pomorskie	Drawsko Pomorskie	Drawsko	West Pomeranian Voivodeship	Dramburg
Drezdenko	Drezdenko	Strzelce-Drezdenko	Lubusz Voivodeship	Driesen
Drogomin	Sulęcin	Sulęcin	Lubusz Voivodeship	Heinersdorf
Drzeńsko, Lubusz Voivodeship	Rzepin	Słubice	Lubusz Voivodeship	Drenzig
Drzewce, Lubusz Voivodeship	Torzym	Sulęcin	Lubusz Voivodeship	Leichholz
Drzonków		Zielona Góra	Lubusz Voivodeship	Drentkau
Dziadoszyce	Kożuchów	Nowa Sól	Lubusz Voivodeship	Döringau
Działdowo		Działdowo	Warmian-Masurian Voivodeship	Soldau
Dziećmorowice	Walim	Wałbrzych	Lower Silesian Voivodeship	Dittmannsdorf
Dzierzgoń	Dzierzgoń	Sztum	Pomeranian Voivodeship	Christburg
Dzierżoniów		Dzierżoniów	Lower Silesian Voivodeship	Reichenbach
Dziwnów	Dziwnów	Kamień	West Pomeranian Voivodeship	Berg Dievenow
Dźwirzyno	Kołobrzeg	Kołobrzeg	West Pomeranian Voivodeship	Kolberger Deep
Elbląg			Warmian-Masurian Voivodeship	Elbing
Ełk		Ełk	Warmian-Masurian Voivodeship	Lyck
Frombork	Frombork	Braniewo	Warmian-Masurian Voivodeship	Frauenberg
Gądków Wielki	Torzym	Sulęcin	Lubusz Voivodeship	Groß Gandern
Gdańsk			Pomeranian Voivodeship	Danzig
Gębice, Krosno Odrzańskie County	Gubin	Krosno	Lubusz Voivodeship	Amtitz
Giżycko		Giżycko County	Warmian-Masurian Voivodeship	Lötzen
Glińsk	Świebodzin	Świebodzin	Lubusz Voivodeship	Leimnitz
Glisno, Gmina Lubniewice	Lubniewice	Sulęcin	Lubusz Voivodeship	Gleißen
Gliwice			Silesian Voivodeship	Gleiwitz
Głogów		Głogów	Lower Silesian Voivodeship	(Groß) Glogau
Głogówek	Głogówek	Prudnik	Opole Voivodeship	Oberglogau
Głubczyce	Głubczyce	Głubczyce	Opole Voivodeship	Leobschütz
Głuchołazy	Głuchołazy	Nysa	Opole Voivodeship	Bad Ziegenhals
Głusko	Dobiegniew	Strzelce-Drezdenko	Lubusz Voivodeship	Steinbusch
Gniew	Gniew	Tczew	Pomeranian Voivodeship	Mewe
Gniewkowo	Gniewkowo	Inowrocław	Kuyavian-Pomeranian Voivodeship	Argenau
Gniezno		Gniezno	Greater Poland Voivodeship	Gnesen
Golczewo	Golczewo	Kamień	West Pomeranian Voivodeship	Gülzow
Gołdap	Gołdap	Gołdap	Warmian-Masurian Voivodeship	Goldap
Goleniów	Goleniów	Goleniów	West Pomeranian Voivodeship	Gullnow
Górna Grupa	Dragacz	Świecie	Kuyavian-Pomeranian Voivodeship	Ober Gruppe
Górzno	Górzno	Brodnica	Kuyavian-Pomeranian Voivodeship	Görzbenz
Górowo Iławeckie		Bartoszyce	Warmian-Masurian Voivodeship	Landsberg in Ostpreußen
Gorzów Wielkopolski			Lubusz Voivodeship	Landsberg an der Warthe
Gorzyca, Lubusz Voivodeship	Międzyrzecz	Międzyrzecz	Lubusz Voivodeship	Ober Görzig
Gościkowo	Świebodzin	Świebodzin	Lubusz Voivodeship	Paradies
Gościno	Gościno	Kołobrzeg	West Pomeranian Voivodeship	Groß Jestin
Gościnowo	Skwierzyna	Międzyrzecz	Lubusz Voivodeship	Alexandersdorf
Gozdnica		Żagań	Lubusz Voivodeship	Freiwaldau
Gozdno, Lubusz Voivodeship	Lubsko	Żary	Lubusz Voivodeship	Heidehäuser
Gozdowice	Mieszkowice	Gryfino	West Pomeranian Voivodeship	Güstebiese
Grabów nad Prosną	Grabów nad Prosną	Ostrzeszów	Greater Poland Voivodeship	Grabow
Grabów nad Prosną	Grabów nad Prosną	Ostrzeszów	Greater Poland Voivodeship	Altwerder (Note: Used from 1940 until 1945.)
Grabowo, Stargard County	Stargard	Stargard	West Pomeranian Voivodeship	Buchholz
Grabowo, Szczecin	Drzetowo-Grabowo	Szczecin	West Pomeranian Voivodeship	Grabow (Note: District of Szczecin.)
Groblice	Siechnice	Wrocław	Lower Silesian Voivodeship	Grebelwitz
Grodków	Grodków	Brzeg	Opole Voivodeship	Grottkau
Grodziszcze, Świebodzin County	Świebodzin	Świebodzin	Lubusz Voivodeship	Gräditz
Grodziszcze, Żary County	Brody	Żary	Lubusz Voivodeship	Grötzsch
Grudziądz			Kuyavian-Pomeranian Voivodeship	Graudenz
Gryfice	Gryfice	Gryfice	West Pomeranian Voivodeship	Greifenberg in Pommern
Gryfino	Gryfino	Gryfino	West Pomeranian Voivodeship	Greifenhagen
Grzędzice	Stargard	Stargard	West Pomeranian Voivodeship	Seefeld
Grzybowo, Giżycko County				Grzybowen (Note: Before 1929)
Grzybowo, Giżycko County				Birkensee
Grzybowo, West Pomeranian Voivodeship	Kołobrzeg	Kołobrzeg	West Pomeranian Voivodeship	Gribow
Gubin, Poland		Krosno	Lubusz Voivodeship	Guben
Gutkowo, Warmian-Masurian Voivodeship	Jonkowo	Olsztyn	Warmian-Masurian Voivodeship	Göttkendorf (Note: Part of Olsztyn.)
Hel, Poland		Puck	Pomeranian Voivodeship	Hela
Iława		Iława	Warmian-Masurian Voivodeship	Deutsch Eylau
Iłowa	Iłowa	Żagań	Lubusz Voivodeship	Halbau
Ińsko	Ińsko	Stargard	West Pomeranian Voivodeship	Nörenberg
Jabłonowo Pomorskie	Jabłonowo Pomorskie	Brodnica	Kuyavian-Pomeranian Voivodeship	Jablonowo
Jabłonowo Pomorskie	Jabłonowo Pomorskie	Brodnica	Kuyavian-Pomeranian Voivodeship	Goßlershausen (Note: Used from 1903 until 1945.)
Jałowice	Brody	Żary	Lubusz Voivodeship	Jaulitz
Janiszowice, Żary County	Brody	Żary	Lubusz Voivodeship	Jähnsdorf
Jarkowice	Lubawka	Kamienna Góra	Lower Silesian Voivodeship	Hermsdorf Städtisch
Jaroty, Gmina Stawiguda		Olsztyn	Warmian-Masurian Voivodeship	Jomendorf
Jasień, Lubusz Voivodeship	Jasień	Żary	Lubusz Voivodeship	Gassen
Jastrowie	Jastrowie	Złotów	Greater Poland Voivodeship	Jastrow
Jawor		Jawor	Lower Silesian Voivodeship	Jauer
Jelenia Góra			Lower Silesian Voivodeship	Hirschberg im Riesengeberge
Jeziory, Lubusz Voivodeship	Świebodzin	Świebodzin	Lubusz Voivodeship	Jehser
Jeziory Dolne	Brody	Żary	Lubusz Voivodeship	Nieder Jeser
Jeziorany	Jeziorany	Olsztyn	Warmian-Masurian Voivodeship	Seeburg
Jordanowo, Lubusz Voivodeship	Świebodzin	Świebodzin	Lubusz Voivodeship	Jordan
Kaława	Międzyrzecz	Międzyrzecz	Lubusz Voivodeship	Kalau
Kalisz Pomorski	Kalisz Pomorski	Drawsko	West Pomeranian Voivodeship	Kallies
Kalsko	Międzyrzecz	Międzyrzecz	Lubusz Voivodeship	Kalzig
Kamień Pomorski	Kamień Pomorski		West Pomeranian Voivodeship	Cammin
Kamienna Góra		Kamienna Góra	Lower Silesian Voivodeship	Landeshut
Kargowa	Kargowa	Zielona Góra	Lubusz Voivodeship	Unruhstadt
Karlino	Karlino	Białogard	West Pomeranian Voivodeship	Körlin an der Persante
Katowice			Silesian Voivodeship	Kattowitz
Kąty Rybackie	Sztutowo	Nowy Dwór	Pomeranian Voivodeship	Bodenwinkel
Kąty Wrocławskie	Kąty Wrocławskie	Wrocław	Lower Silesian Voivodeship	Kanth
Kąty Wrocławskie	Kąty Wrocławskie	Wrocław	Lower Silesian Voivodeship	Canth (Note: Used until 1930.)
Kędzierzyn-Koźle		Kędzierzyn-Koźle	Opole Voivodeship	Kandrzin-Cosel
Kępsko, Lubusz Voivodeship	Świebodzin	Świebodzin	Lubusz Voivodeship	Schönborn
Kęszyca	Międzyrzecz	Międzyrzecz	Lubusz Voivodeship	Kainscht
Kętrzyn		Kętrzyn	Warmian–Masurian Voivodeship	Rastenburg
Klępino	Stargard	Stargard	West Pomeranian Voivodeship	Klempin
Klępsk	Sulechów	Zielona Góra	Lubusz Voivodeship	Klemzig
Kłodzko		Kłodzko	Lower Silesian Voivodeship	Glatz
Kłonowo	Dobre	Radziejów	Kuyavian-Pomeranian Voivodeship	Klönnau
Klonowo, Tuchola County	Lubiewo	Tuchola	Kuyavian-Pomeranian Voivodeship	Klonowo
Klonowo, Tuchola County	Lubiewo	Tuchola	Kuyavian-Pomeranian Voivodeship	Klontal (Note: Used from 1908 until 1945.)
Kłopot, Lubusz Voivodeship	Cybinka	Słubice	Lubusz Voivodeship	Kloppitz
Kluczbork	Kluczbork	Kluczbork	Opole Voivodeship	Kreuzberg
Koło		Koło	Greater Poland Voivodeship	Kohlo
Kołobrzeg		Kołobrzeg		Kolberg
Kolonowskie	Kolonowskie	Strzelce	Opole Voivodeship	Colonnowska
Kolonowskie	Kolonowskie	Strzelce	Opole Voivodeship	Grafenweiler (Note: Used from 1936 until 1945.)
Konin Żagański	Iłowa	Żagań	Lubusz Voivodeship	Kunau
Korfantów	Korfantów	Nysa	Opole Voivodeship	Friedland in Oberschlesien
Koronowo	Koronowo	Bydgoszcz	Kuyavian-Pomeranian Voivodeship	Polnisch Krone (Note: Archaic name.)
Koronowo	Koronowo	Bydgoszcz	Kuyavian-Pomeranian Voivodeship	Crone an der Brahe
Koronowo	Koronowo	Bydgoszcz	Kuyavian-Pomeranian Voivodeship	Krone an der Brahe (Note: Used from 1942 until 1945.)
Kosarzyn, Lubusz Voivodeship	Gubin	Krosno	Lubusz Voivodeship	Kuschern
Kościan		Kościan	Greater Poland Voivodeship	Kosten
Kostrzyn nad Odrą		Gorzów	Lubusz Voivodeship	Küstrin
Koszalin				Köslin
Kotowice, Lubusz Voivodeship	Nowogród Bobrzański	Zielona Góra	Lubusz Voivodeship	Kottwitz
Kowalewo Pomorskie	Kowalewo Pomorskie	Golub-Dobrzyń	Kuyavian-Pomeranian Voivodeship	Schönsee
Kożuchów	Kożuchów	Nowa Sól	Lubusz Voivodeship	Freystadt in Schlesien
Kozy		Bielsko County	Silesian Voivodeship	Seiffersdorf
Kozy		Bielsko County	Silesian Voivodeship	Seibersdorf
Kozy		Bielsko County	Silesian Voivodeship	Kosy
Krąg, West Pomeranian Voivodeship	Polanów	Koszalin	West Pomeranian Voivodeship	Krangen
Krajenka	Krajenka	Złotów	Greater Poland Voivodeship	Krojanke
Krajnik Dolny	Chojna	Gryfino	West Pomeranian Voivodeship	Nieder-Kränig
Krajnik Górny	Chojna	Gryfino	West Pomeranian Voivodeship	Hohen-Kränig
Kraków				Krakau
Krapkowice	Krapkowice	Krapkowice	Opole Voivodeship	Krappitz
Krążkowo, Lubusz Voivodeship	Sława	Wschowa	Lubusz Voivodeship	Altkranz
Krosino, Szczecinek County	Grzmiąca	Szczecinek	West Pomeranian Voivodeship	(Groß) Krössin
Krzeszowice	Krzeszowice	Kraków	Lesser Poland Voivodeship	Kressendorf
Krosno Odrzańskie	Krosno Odrzańskie	Krosno	Lubusz Voivodeship	Crossen an der Oder
Kuligowo, Zielona Góra County	Babimost	Zielona Góra	Lubusz Voivodeship	Kulkau
Kumiałtowice	Brody	Żary	Lubusz Voivodeship	Kummeltitz
Kunowice	Słubice	Słubice	Lubusz Voivodeship	Kunersdorf
Kupienino	Świebodzin	Świebodzin	Lubusz Voivodeship	Koppen
Kurcewo	Stargard	Stargard	West Pomeranian Voivodeship	Krüssow
Kursko	Międzyrzecz	Międzyrzecz	Lubusz Voivodeship	Kurzig
Kuźnik, Lubusz Voivodeship	Międzyrzecz	Międzyrzecz	Lubusz Voivodeship	Kupfermühle
Kwidzyn		Kwidzyn	Pomeranian Voivodeship	Marienwerder
Lasocin, Lubusz Voivodeship	Kożuchów	Nowa Sól	Lubusz Voivodeship	Lessendorf
Lędyczek	Okonek	Złotów	Greater Poland Voivodeship	Landeck in Westpreußen
Legnica			Lower Silesian Voivodeship	Liegnitz
Legnickie Pole	Legnickie Pole	Legnica	Lower Silesian Voivodeship	Wahlstatt
Lemierzyce	Słońsk	Sulęcin	Lubusz Voivodeship	Alt Limmritz
Leśnica	Leśnica	Strzelce	Opole Voivodeship	Leschnitz
Leśnica	Leśnica	Strzelce	Opole Voivodeship	Bergstadt
Leśniów Wielki	Czerwieńsk	Zielona Góra	Lubusz Voivodeship	Lessen
Leszno			Greater Poland Voivodeship	Lissa
Leszno Dolne	Szprotawa	Żagań	Lubusz Voivodeship	Nieder Leschen
Lichnówki	Lichnowy	Malbork	Pomeranian Voivodeship	Klein Lichtenau
Lichnowy, Malbork County	Lichnowy	Malbork	Pomeranian Voivodeship	Groß Lichtenau
Lidzbark Warmiński		Lidzbark	Warmian-Masurian Voivodeship	Heilsberg
Likusy	Nidzica	Nidzica	Warmian-Masurian Voivodeship	Likusen
Linia, Pomeranian Voivodeship	Linia	Wejherowo	Pomeranian Voivodeship	Linde
Lipiany	Lipiany	Pyrzyce	West Pomeranian Voivodeship	Lippehne
Lipie Góry, Lubusz Voivodeship	Strzelce Krajeńskie	Strzelce-Drezdenko	Lubusz Voivodeship	Mansfelde
Lipnik, West Pomeranian Voivodeship	Stargard	Stargard	West Pomeranian Voivodeship	Lindenberg
Lisewo Malborskie	Lichnowy	Malbork	Pomeranian Voivodeship	Ließau
Lubawka	Lubawka	Kamienna Góra	Lower Silesian Voivodeship	Liebau
Lubiewo, Kuyavian-Pomeranian Voivodeship	Lubiewo	Tuchola	Kuyavian-Pomeranian Voivodeship	Lobfelde
Lubiszewo Tczewskie	Tczew	Tczew	Pomeranian Voivodeship	Liebschau
Lubin		Lubin	Lower Silesian Voivodeship	Lüben
Lubinicko	Świebodzin	Świebodzin	Lubusz Voivodeship	Merzdorf
Lubogóra	Świebodzin	Świebodzin	Lubusz Voivodeship	Wilhelmshöhe
Luboń		Poznań	Greater Poland Voivodeship	Luban
Lubsko	Lubsko	Żary	Lubusz Voivodeship	Sommerfeld
Lututów	Lututów	Wieruszów	Łódź Voivodeship	Lututow
Lututów	Lututów	Wieruszów	Łódź Voivodeship	Landstett (Note: Used from 1939 until 1943.)
Lututów	Lututów	Wieruszów	Łódź Voivodeship	Landstätt
Łagoda	Nowogród Bobrzański	Zielona Góra	Lubusz Voivodeship	Legel
Łasin	Łasin	Grudziądz	Kuyavian-Pomeranian Voivodeship	Lessen
Łask	Łask	Łask	Łódź Voivodeship	Lask
Łaziska Górne		Mikołów	Silesian Voivodeship	Ober Lazisk
Łazy Lubuskie	Słubice	Słubice	Lubusz Voivodeship	Lubuser Loose
Łeba		Lębork	Pomeranian Voivodeship	Leba
Łęgajny	Barczewo	Olsztyn	Warmian-Masurian Voivodeship	Lengainen
Łęknica		Żary	Lubusz Voivodeship	Lugknitz
Łężyca		Zielona Góra	Lubusz Voivodeship	Lansitz
Łobez	Łobez	Łobez	West Pomeranian Voivodeship	Labes
Łobżenica	Łobżenica	Piła	Greater Poland Voivodeship	Lobsens
Łomczewo	Okonek	Złotów	Greater Poland Voivodeship	Lümzow
Łódź			Łódź Voivodeship	Lodsch
Łódź			Łódź Voivodeship	Litzmannstadt (Note: Used from 1939 until 1945.)
Ługów, Lubusz Voivodeship	Świebodzin	Świebodzin	Lubusz Voivodeship	Lugau
Łupstych, Olsztyn County	Gietrzwałd	Olsztyn	Warmian-Masurian Voivodeship	Abstich
Łyna, Warmian-Masurian Voivodeship	Nidzica	Nidzica	Warmian-Masurian Voivodeship	Lahna
Łysomice, Kuyavian-Pomeranian Voivodeship	Łysomice	Toruń	Kuyavian-Pomeranian Voivodeship	Lissomitz
Łysomice, Kuyavian-Pomeranian Voivodeship	Łysomice	Toruń	Kuyavian-Pomeranian Voivodeship	Posemsdorf
Maczków	Cybinka	Słubice	Lubusz Voivodeship	Matschdorf
Malbork		Malbork	Pomeranian Voivodeship	Marienburg
Małkocin	Stargard	Stargard	West Pomeranian Voivodeship	Mulkenthin
Małomice	Małomice	Żagań	Lubusz Voivodeship	Mallmitz
Marianka, Lubusz Voivodeship	Brody	Żary	Lubusz Voivodeship	Marienhain
Maszewo	Maszewo	Goleniów	West Pomeranian Voivodeship	Massow
Miasteczko Krajeńskie	Miasteczko Krajeńskie	Piła	Greater Poland Voivodeship	Friedheim
Miastko	Miastko	Bytów	Pomeranian Voivodeship	Rummelsburg
Międzychód	Międzychód	Międzychód	Greater Poland Voivodeship	Birnbaum
Międzyzdroje	Międzyzdroje	Kamień	West Pomeranian Voivodeship	Misdroj
Międzyrzecz	Międzyrzecz	Międzyrzecz	Lubusz Voivodeship	Meseritz
Mieszków, Lubusz Voivodeship	Trzebiel	Żary	Lubusz Voivodeship	Beinsdorf
Mieszkowice	Mieszkowice	Gryfino	West Pomeranian Voivodeship	Bärwalde in der Neumark
Mieszkowice, Opole Voivodeship	Prudnik	Prudnik	Opole Voivodeship	Dittmannsdorf
Mikołajki Pomorskie	Mikołajki Pomorskie	Sztum	Pomeranian Voivodeship	Nikolaiken
Mikołajki Pomorskie	Mikołajki Pomorskie	Sztum	Pomeranian Voivodeship	Niklaskirchen
Mikołów		Mikołów	Silesian Voivodeship	Nicolai
Miłochowice	Milicz	Milicz	Lower Silesian Voivodeship	Melochwitz
Miłochowice	Milicz	Milicz	Lower Silesian Voivodeship	Mühlhagen
Miłakowo	Miłakowo	Ostróda	Warmian-Masurian Voivodeship	Liebstadt
Miłobądz, Pomeranian Voivodeship	Tczew	Tczew	Pomeranian Voivodeship	Mühlbanz
Miłomłyn	Miłomłyn	Ostróda	Warmian-Masurian Voivodeship	Liebemühl
Mirocin Dolny	Kożuchów	Nowa Sól	Lubusz Voivodeship	Nieder Herzogswaldau
Mirocin Górny	Kożuchów	Nowa Sól	Lubusz Voivodeship	Ober Herzogswaldau
Mirocin Średni	Kożuchów	Nowa Sól	Lubusz Voivodeship	Mittel Herzogswaldau
Mirosławiec	Mirosławiec	Wałcz	West Pomeranian Voivodeship	Märkisch Friedland
Miszkowice	Lubawka	Kamienna Góra	Lower Silesian Voivodeship	Michelsdorf
Morąg	Morąg	Ostróda	Warmian-Masurian Voivodeship	Morhrungen
Moryń	Moryń	Gryfino	West Pomeranian Voivodeship	Mohrin
Mrągowo		Mrągowo	Warmian-Masurian Voivodeship	Sensburg
Mrocza	Mrocza	Nakło	Kuyavian-Pomeranian Voivodeship	Mrotschen
Mrocza	Mrocza	Nakło	Kuyavian-Pomeranian Voivodeship	Schönhausen (Note: Used from 1939 until 1942.)
Mrocza	Mrocza	Nakło	Kuyavian-Pomeranian Voivodeship	Immenheim
Mrzeżyno	Trzebiatów	Gryfice	West Pomeranian Voivodeship	(Treptower) Deep
Myślibórz	Myślibórz	Myślibórz	West Pomeranian Voivodeship	Soldin
Mysłowice			Silesian Voivodeship	Myslowitz
Nabłoto	Brody	Żary	Lubusz Voivodeship	Nablat
Nabłoto	Brody	Żary	Lubusz Voivodeship	Nahberg
Nidzica	Nidzica	Nidzica	Warmian-Masurian Voivodeship	Neidenburg
Niechorze	Rewal	Gryfice	West Pomeranian Voivodeship	Horst
Nietków	Czerwieńsk	Zielona Góra	Lubusz Voivodeship	Polnisch Nettkow
Nietoperek	Międzyrzecz	Międzyrzecz	Lubusz Voivodeship	Nipter
Niwica, Żary County	Trzebiel	Żary	Lubusz Voivodeship	Zibelle
Nowa Ruda				Neurode
Nowa Sól		Nowa Sól	Lubusz Voivodeship	Neusalz an der Oder
Nowe	Nowe	Świecie	Kuyavian-Pomeranian Voivodeship	Neuenberg in Westpreußen
Nowe	Nowe	Świecie	Kuyavian-Pomeranian Voivodeship	Neuenberg (Weichsel)
Nowe Biskupice, Lubusz Voivodeship	Słubice	Słubice	Lubusz Voivodeship	Neu Bischofsee
Nowe Miasteczko	Nowe Miasteczko	Nowa Sól	Lubusz Voivodeship	Neu Städtel
Nowe Warpno	Nowe Warpno	Police	West Pomeranian Voivodeship	Neuwarp
Nowogard	Nowogard	Goleniów	West Pomeranian Voivodeship	Naugard
Nowogród Bobrzański	Nowogród Bobrzański	Zielona Góra	Lubusz Voivodeship	Naumburg am Bober
Nowoszów	Iłowa	Żagań	Lubusz Voivodeship	Neuhaus
Nowy Dwór, Międzyrzecz County	Skwierzyna	Międzyrzecz	Lubusz Voivodeship	Neuhaus
Nowy Dwór Gdański	Nowy Dwór Gdański	Nowy Dwór	Pomeranian Voivodeship	Tiegenhof
Nowy Kisielin		Zielona Góra	Lubusz Voivodeship	Deutsch Kessel
Nowy Lubusz	Słubice	Słubice	Lubusz Voivodeship	Neu Lebus
Nowy Staw	Nowy Staw	Malbork	Pomeranian Voivodeship	Neuteich
Nowy Tomyśl	Nowy Tomyśl	Nowy Tomyśl	Greater Poland Voivodeship	Neutomischel
Nysa, Poland	Nysa	Nysa	Opole Voivodeship	Neiße
Obłotne	Sulechów	Zielona Góra	Lubusz Voivodeship	Oblath
Ochla, Greater Poland Voivodeship	Pogorzela	Gostyń	Greater Poland Voivodeship	Ochelhermsdorf
Odolanów	Odolanów	Ostrów	Greater Poland Voivodeship	Adelnau
Okonek	Okonek	Złotów	Greater Poland Voivodeship	Ratzebuhr
Oława		Oława	Lower Silesian Voivodeship	Ohlau
Olecko	Olecko	Olecko	Warmian-Masurian Voivodeship	Marggrabowa
Olecko	Olecko	Olecko	Warmian-Masurian Voivodeship	Treuberg (Note: During 1928)
Oleśnica		Oleśnica	Lower Silesian Voivodeship	Öls
Olesno	Olesno	Olesno	Opole Voivodeship	Rosenberg
Olsztyn			Warmian-Masurian Voivodeship	Allenstein
Olszyna	Olszyna	Lubań	Lower Silesian Voivodeship	Erlenholz
Opole			Opole Voivodeship	Oppeln
Orneta	Orneta	Lidzbark	Warmian-Masurian Voivodeship	Wormditt
Orzesze		Mikołów	Silesian Voivodeship	Orzesche
Ośno Lubuskie	Ośno Lubuskie	Słubice	Lubusz Voivodeship	Drossen
Osogóra	Świebodzin	Świebodzin	Lubusz Voivodeship	Friedrichstabor
Osowa Sień	Wschowa	Wschowa	Lubusz Voivodeship	Röhrsdorf
Ostróda		Ostróda	Warmian-Masurian Voivodeship	Hohenstein
Ostrów Wielkopolski		Ostrów	Greater Poland Voivodeship	Ostrow
Oświęcim	Oświęcim	Oświęcim	Lesser Poland Voivodeship	Auschwitz
Ozimek	Ozimek	Opole	Opole Voivodeship	Malapane
Pasłęk	Pasłęk	Elbląg	Warmian-Masurian Voivodeship	Preussisch Holland
Pełczyce	Pełczyce	Choszczno	West Pomeranian Voivodeship	Bernstein
Pelplin	Pelplin	Tczew	Pomeranian Voivodeship	Pelplin
Pęzino	Stargard	Stargard	West Pomeranian Voivodeship	Pansin
Piekary Śląskie			Silesian Voivodeship	Deutsch Piekar
Pieniężno	Pieniężno	Braniewo	Warmian-Masurian Voivodeship	Mehlsack
Pieszyce	Pieszyce	Dzierżoniów	Lower Silesian Voivodeship	Peterswaldau
Piła		Piła County	Greater Poland Voivodeship	Schneidemühl
Piotrków Trybunalski			Łódź Voivodeship	Petrikau
Pisz	Pisz	Pisz	Warmian-Masurian Voivodeship	Johannisberg
Płoty, Lubusz Voivodeship	Czerwieńsk	Zielona Góra	Lubusz Voivodeship	Plothow
Płoty	Płoty	Gryfice	West Pomeranian Voivodeship	Plathe an der Rega
Pniów, West Pomeranian Voivodeship	Myślibórz	Myślibórz	West Pomeranian Voivodeship	Pinnow
Poczernin, West Pomeranian Voivodeship	Stargard	Stargard	West Pomeranian Voivodeship	Pützerlin
Podmokle Małe	Babimost	Zielona Góra	Lubusz Voivodeship	Klein Posemuckel
Podmokle Wielkie	Babimost	Zielona Góra	Lubusz Voivodeship	Groß Posemuckel
Polanów	Polanów	Koszalin	West Pomeranian Voivodeship	Pollnow
Połczyn-Zdrój	Połczyn-Zdrój	Świdwin	West Pomeranian Voivodeship	Bad Polzin
Police, West Pomeranian Voivodeship	Police	Police	West Pomeranian Voivodeship	Pölitz
Polkowice	Polkowice	Polkowice	Lower Silesian Voivodeship	Heerwegen (Note: Obsolete, used during World War II)
Polkowice	Polkowice	Polkowice	Lower Silesian Voivodeship	Polkowitz
Poznań			Greater Poland Voivodeship	Posen
Pozorty, Iława County	Zalewo	Iława	Warmian-Masurian Voivodeship	Posorten
Prabuty	Prabuty	Kwidzyn	Pomeranian Voivodeship	Riesenberg
Prószków	Prószków	Opole	Opole Voivodeship	Proskau
Proszów, Lubusz Voivodeship	Brody	Żary	Lubusz Voivodeship	Drahthammer
Prudnik	Prudnik	Prudnik	Opole Voivodeship	Neustadt
Pruszcz, Świecie County	Pruszcz	Świecie	Kuyavian-Pomeranian Voivodeship	Prust
Pruszcz Gdański		Gdańsk	Pomeranian Voivodeship	Praust
Przemków	Przemków	Polkowice	Lower Silesian Voivodeship	Primkenau
Przybiernów	Przybiernów	Goleniów	West Pomeranian Voivodeship	Pribbernow
Przygodzice	Przygodzice	Ostrów	Greater Poland Voivodeship	Groß Pschygodschitz
Przygodzice	Przygodzice	Ostrów	Greater Poland Voivodeship	Hirschteich
Pszczółki, Pomeranian Voivodeship	Pszczółki	Gdańsk	Pomeranian Voivodeship	Hohenstein
Pszczyna	Pszczyna	Pszczyna	Silesian Voivodeship	Pleß
Pyrzany	Witnica	Gorzów	Lubusz Voivodeship	Pyrehne
Pyrzyce	Pyrzyce	Pyrzyce	West Pomeranian Voivodeship	Pyritz
Rybnik			Silesian Voivodeship	Rübnick
Rąbino	Rąbino	Świdwin	West Pomeranian Voivodeship	Groß Rambin
Racibórz		Racibórz	Silesian Voivodeship	Ratibor
Racula		Zielona Góra	Lubusz Voivodeship	Larenwalde
Racula		Zielona Góra	Lubusz Voivodeship	Lawaldau
Radziejów		Radziejów	Kuyavian-Pomeranian Voivodeship	Rädichau
Radzyń Chełmiński	Radzyń Chełmiński	Grudziądz	Kuyavian-Pomeranian Voivodeship	Rehden
Rąpice	Cybinka	Słubice	Lubusz Voivodeship	Rampitz
Recz	Recz	Choszczno	West Pomeranian Voivodeship	Reetz
Redykajny	Dywity	Olsztyn	Warmian-Masurian Voivodeship	Redigkainen
Resko	Resko	Łobez	West Pomeranian Voivodeship	Regenwalde
Reszel	Reszel	Kętrzyn	Warmian-Masurian Voivodeship	Rößel
Rogoźnica, Lower Silesian Voivodeship	Strzegom	Świdnica	Lower Silesian Voivodeship	Groß Rosen
Rosin, Poland	Świebodzin	Świebodzin	Lubusz Voivodeship	Rissen
Rozłogi, Lubusz Voivodeship				Friedrichswerder
Ruda Śląska			Silesian Voivodeship	Ruda
Rudgerzowice	Świebodzin	Świebodzin	Lubusz Voivodeship	Riegersdorf
Rusinów, Lubusz Voivodeship	Świebodzin	Świebodzin	Lubusz Voivodeship	Rinnersdorf
Rychlik, Lubusz Voivodeship	Sulęcin	Sulęcin	Lubusz Voivodeship	Reichen
Rydzynka	Okonek	Złotów	Greater Poland Voivodeship	Krügershof
Ryn	Ryn	Giżycko	Warmian-Masurian Voivodeship	Rhein
Rzeczyca, Polkowice County	Grębocice	Polkowice	Lower Silesian Voivodeship	Rietschütz
Rzepin	Rzepin	Słubice	Lubusz Voivodeship	Reppen
Sarbinowo, Gmina Dębno	Dębno	Myślibórz	West Pomeranian Voivodeship	Zorndorf
Sępólno Krajeńskie	Sępólno Krajeńskie	Sępólno	Kuyavian-Pomeranian Voivodeship	Zempelburg
Sępopol	Sępopol	Bartoszyce	Warmian-Masurian Voivodeship	Schippenbeil
Siemianowice Śląskie			Silesian Voivodeship	Laurahütte
Siemiradz, Lubusz Voivodeship	Trzebiel	Żary	Lubusz Voivodeship	Neudorf
Sianów	Sianów	Koszalin	West Pomeranian Voivodeship	Zanow
Siekierki, West Pomeranian Voivodeship	Cedynia	Gryfino	West Pomeranian Voivodeship	Zäckerick
Skalin, Gryfice County	Gryfice	Gryfice	West Pomeranian Voivodeship	Schellin
Skórcz		Starogard	Pomeranian Voivodeship	Skurz
Skórcz		Starogard	Pomeranian Voivodeship	Großwollental
Skrzynica	Skwierzyna	Międzyrzecz	Lubusz Voivodeship	Krinitza
Skwierzyna	Skwierzyna	Międzyrzecz	Lubusz Voivodeship	Schwerin an der Warthe
Sława	Sława	Wschowa	Lubusz Voivodeship	Schlawa
Sława	Sława	Wschowa	Lubusz Voivodeship	Schlesiersee
Sławno		Sławno	West Pomeranian Voivodeship	Schlawe
Słońsk	Słońsk	Sulęcin	Lubusz Voivodeship	Sonnenburg
Słubice	Słubice	Słubice	Lubusz Voivodeship	Dammvorstadt
Słupsk			Pomeranian Voivodeship	Stolp
Smogóry	Ośno Lubuskie	Słubice	Lubusz Voivodeship	Schmagorei
Sobótka	Sobótka	Wrocław	Lower Silesian Voivodeship	Zobten
Sokołów, Lubusz Voivodeship	Kożuchów	Nowa Sól	Lubusz Voivodeship	Zöcklau
Solec Kujawski	Solec Kujawski	Bydgoszcz	Kuyavian-Pomeranian Voivodeship	Schulitz
Solniki, Lubusz Voivodeship	Kożuchów	Nowa Sól	Lubusz Voivodeship	Zölling
Sowno, Stargard County	Stargard	Stargard	West Pomeranian Voivodeship	Hinzendorf
Stara Rudnica	Cedynia	Gryfino	West Pomeranian Voivodeship	Alt Rüdnitz
Stare Biskupice, Lubusz Voivodeship	Słubice	Słubice	Lubusz Voivodeship	Alt Bischofsee
Stare Osieczno	Dobiegniew	Strzelce-Drezdenko	Lubusz Voivodeship	Hochzeit
Stargard		Stargard	West Pomeranian Voivodeship	Stargard in Pommern
Starogard Gdański		Starogard	Pomeranian Voivodeship	Preußisch Stargard
Starościn, Lubusz Voivodeship	Rzepin	Słubice	Lubusz Voivodeship	Friedrichswille
Starosiedle	Gubin	Krosno	Lubusz Voivodeship	Starzeddel
Stary Błeszyn	Mieszkowice	Gryfino	West Pomeranian Voivodeship	Alt-Blessin
Stary Kostrzynek	Cedynia	Gryfino	West Pomeranian Voivodeship	Altküstrinchen
Stegna	Stegna	Nowy Dwór	Pomeranian Voivodeship	Steegen
Stegna	Stegna	Nowy Dwór	Pomeranian Voivodeship	Steegen-Kobbelgrube
Strzegom	Strzegom	Świdnica	Lower Silesian Voivodeship	Striegau
Strzelce Krajeńskie	Strzelce Krajeńskie	Strzelce-Drezdenko	Lubusz Voivodeship	Friedeberg
Strzelce Opolskie	Strzelce Opolskie	Strzelce	Opole Voivodeship	Groß Strehlitz
Strzelin	Strzelin	Strzelin	Lower Silesian Voivodeship	Strehlen
Strzeszowice	Trzebiel	Żary	Lubusz Voivodeship	(Tz)schaksdorf
Strzyżno	Stargard	Stargard	West Pomeranian Voivodeship	Streesen
Suchań	Suchań	Stargard	West Pomeranian Voivodeship	Zachan
Suchodół, Lubusz Voivodeship	Brody	Żary	Lubusz Voivodeship	Zauchel
Sudoł, Lubusz Voivodeship				Seedorf
Sulechów	Sulechów	Zielona Góra		Züllichau
Sulęcin	Sulęcin	Sulęcin	Lubusz Voivodeship	Zielenzig
Susz	Susz	Iława	Warmian-Masurian Voivodeship	Rosenberg in Westpreußen
Świdnica, Lubusz Voivodeship	Świdnica	Zielona Góra	Lubusz Voivodeship	Schweinitz
Świdnica		Świdnica	Lower Silesian Voivodeship	Schweidnitz
Świdwin		Świdwin	West Pomeranian Voivodeship	Schivelbein
Świebodów	Krośnice	Milicz	Lower Silesian Voivodeship	Schwiebedawe
Świebodów	Krośnice	Milicz	Lower Silesian Voivodeship	Frankenberg (Note: Used from 1925 until 1947.)
Świebodzice		Świdnica	Lower Silesian Voivodeship	Freiburg in Schlesien
Świebodzin	Świebodzin	Świebodzin	Lubusz Voivodeship	Schwiebus
Świecie	Świecie	Świecie	Kuyavian-Pomeranian Voivodeship	Schwetz
Święte, West Pomeranian Voivodeship	Stargard	Stargard	West Pomeranian Voivodeship	Schwendt
Świętochłowice			Silesian Voivodeship	Schwientochlowitz
Święty Wojciech, Lubusz Voivodeship				Georgsdorf
Świnoujście			West Pomeranian Voivodeship	Swinemünde
Szadzko	Dobrzany	Stargard	West Pomeranian Voivodeship	Saatzig
Szalejów Dolny	Kłodzko	Kłodzko	Lower Silesian Voivodeship	Niederschwedeldorf
Szczecin			West Pomeranian Voivodeship	Stettin
Szczecinek		Szczecinek	West Pomeranian Voivodeship	Neustettin
Szczytno		Szczytno	Warmian-Masurian Voivodeship	Ortelsberg
Szkotowo	Kozłowo	Nidzica	Warmian-Masurian Voivodeship	Schottau
Szlichtyngowa	Szlichtyngowa	Wschowa	Lubusz Voivodeship	Schlichtingsheim
Szprotawa	Szprotawa	Żagań	Lubusz Voivodeship	Sprottau
Sztum	Sztum	Sztum	Pomeranian Voivodeship	Stuhm
Sztutowo	Sztutowo	Nowy Dwór	Pomeranian Voivodship	Stutthof
Szumiąca, Lubusz Voivodeship	Międzyrzecz	Międzyrzecz	Lubusz Voivodeship	Schindelmüehl
Szydłów	Szydłów	Staszów	Świętokrzyskie Voivodeship	Schidelo
Tarnowskie Góry		Tarnowskie Góry	Silesian Voivodeship	Tarnowitz
Tczew		Tczew	Pomeranian Voivodeship	Dirschau
Tomaszkowo	Stawiguda	Olsztyn	Warmian-Masurian Voivodeship	Thomsdorf
Toruń			Kuyavian-Pomeranian Voivodeship	Thorn
Torzym	Torzym	Sulęcin	Lubusz Voivodeship	Sternberg in der Neumark
Trąbki Wielkie	Trąbki Wielkie	Gdańsk	Pomeranian Voivodeship	Groß Trampken
Trzciel	Trzciel	Międzyrzecz	Lubusz Voivodeship	Tirschtiegel
Trzcińsko-Zdrój	Trzcińsko-Zdrój	Gryfino	West Pomeranian Voivodeship	Bad Schönfließ
Trzebiatów	Trzebiatów	Gryfice	West Pomeranian Voivodeship	Treptow (an der Rega)
Trzebiel	Trzebiel	Żary	Lubusz Voivodeship	Triebel
Tuchola	Tuchola	Tuchola	Kuyavian-Pomeranian Voivodeship	Tuchel
Tuczno	Tuczno	Wałcz	West Pomeranian Voivodeship	Tütz
Tuławki	Dywity	Olsztyn	Warmian-Masurian Voivodeship	Tollack
Tumiany	Barczewo	Olsztyn	Warmian-Masurian Voivodeship	Daumen
Tychowo	Tychowo	Białogard	West Pomeranian Voivodeship	Groß Tychow
Tychy			Silesian Voivodeship	Tichau
Tyczewo	Tychowo	Białogard	West Pomeranian Voivodeship	Tietzow
Tylewice	Wschowa	Wschowa	Lubusz Voivodeship	Tillendorf
Ujazd, Opole Voivodeship	Ujazd	Strzelce	Opole Voivodeship	Ujest
Ujazd, Opole Voivodeship	Ujazd	Strzelce	Opole Voivodeship	Bischofstal
Ujście	Ujście	Piła	Greater Poland Voivodeship	Usch
Ulikowo	Stargard	Stargard	West Pomeranian Voivodeship	Wulkow
Unieszewo	Gietrzwałd	Olsztyn	Warmian-Masurian Voivodeship	Schonefeld
Unisław, Kuyavian-Pomeranian Voivodeship	Unisław	Chełmno	Kuyavian-Pomeranian Voivodeship	Unislaw
Unisław, Kuyavian-Pomeranian Voivodeship	Unisław	Chełmno	Kuyavian-Pomeranian Voivodeship	Kulmischwenzlau
Urad, Poland	Cybinka	Słubice	Lubusz Voivodeship	Aurith
Ustronie Morskie	Ustronie Morskie	Kołobrzeg	West Pomeranian Voivodeship	(Ostseebad) Henkenhagen
Wąbrzeźno		Wąbrzeźno	Kuyavian-Pomeranian Voivodeship	Briesen
Wadąg	Dywity	Olsztyn	Warmian-Masurian Voivodeship	Wadang
Wałbrzych			Lower Silesian Voivodeship	Waldenburg
Wałcz		Wałcz	West Pomeranian Voivodeship	Deutsch Krone
Warkały, Olsztyn County	Jonkowo	Olsztyn	Warmian-Masurian Voivodeship	Warkallen
Warsaw			Masovian Voivodeship	Warschau
Wędrzyn	Sulęcin	Sulęcin	Lubusz Voivodeship	Wandern
Węgajty	Jonkowo	Olsztyn	Warmian-Masurian Voivodeship	Wengaithen
Węgorzewo	Węgorzewo	Węgorzewo	Warmian-Masurian Voivodeship	Angerburg
Węgorzyno	Węgorzyno	Łobez	West Pomeranian Voivodeship	Wangerin
Wiązów	Wiązów	Strzelin	Lower Silesian Voivodeship	Wansen
Widuchowa, West Pomeranian Voivodeship	Widuchowa	Gryfino	West Pomeranian Voivodeship	Fiddichow
Więcbork	Więcbork	Sępólno	Kuyavian-Pomeranian Voivodeship	Vandsburg
Wiejce	Skwierzyna	Międzyrzecz	Lubusz Voivodeship	Waitze
Wieluń			Łódź Voivodeship	Welun
Wierzbięcin, Lubusz Voivodeship	Trzebiel	Żary	Lubusz Voivodeship	Kochsdorf
Wierzbnica, Lubusz Voivodeship	Bytom Odrzański	Nowa Sól	Lubusz Voivodeship	Dreidorf
Wierzbnica, Lubusz Voivodeship	Bytom Odrzański	Nowa Sól	Lubusz Voivodeship	Würbitz
Wierzchno, Lubusz Voivodeship	Brody	Żary	Lubusz Voivodeship	Wirchenblatt
Włocławek			Kuyavian-Pomeranian Voivodeship	Leslau
Włodowice, Silesian Voivodeship	Włodowice	Zawiercie	Silesian Voivodeship	Waldowitz
Wipsowo	Barczewo	Olsztyn	Warmian-Masurian Voivodeship	Wieps
Wisełka	Wolin	Kamień	West Pomeranian Voivodeship	Neuendorf
Witnica	Witnica	Gorzów	Lubusz Voivodeship	Vietz
Witosław, Lubusz Voivodeship	Świebodzin	Świebodzin	Lubusz Voivodeship	Wittig
Witkowo II	Stargard	Stargard	West Pomeranian Voivodeship	Wittichow bei Stargard
Wityń	Świebodzin	Świebodzin	Lubusz Voivodeship	Witten
Włostowice, Lubusz Voivodeship	Trzebiel	Żary	Lubusz Voivodeship	Roßnitz
Wojnowo, Lubusz Voivodeship	Kargowa	Zielona Góra	Lubusz Voivodeship	Reckenwalde
Wójtowo, Gmina Barczewo	Barczewo	Olsztyn	Warmian-Masurian Voivodeship	Fittigsdorf
Wolin				Wollin
Wolsztyn	Wolsztyn	Wolsztyn	Greater Poland Voivodeship	Wollstein
Woryty	Gietrzwałd	Olsztyn	Warmian-Masurian Voivodeship	Woritten
Wrocław			Lower Silesian Voivodeship	Breslau
Września	Września	Września	Greater Poland Voivodeship	Wreschen
Wschowa	Wschowa	Wschowa	Lubusz Voivodeship	Freustadt
Wyrzysk	Wyrzysk	Piła	Greater Poland Voivodeship	Wirsitz
Wysoka	Wysoka	Piła	Greater Poland Voivodeship	Wissek
Wysoka, Międzyrzecz County	Międzyrzecz	Międzyrzecz	Lubusz Voivodeship	Hochwalde
Wyszanowo	Międzyrzecz	Międzyrzecz	Lubusz Voivodeship	Wischen
Ząbkowice Śląskie	Ząbkowice Śląskie	Ząbkowice	Lower Silesian Voivodeship	Frankenstein in Schleisen
Zabrze			Silesian Voivodeship	Hindenburg
Żagań		Żagań	Lubusz Voivodeship	Sagan
Zalbki	Dywity	Olsztyn	Warmian-Masurian Voivodeship	Salbkeim
Zalewo	Zalewo	Iława	Warmian-Masurian Voivodeship	Saalfeld
Żarki Wielkie	Trzebiel	Żary	Lubusz Voivodeship	Groß Särchen
Żarowo, West Pomeranian Voivodeship	Stargard	Stargard	West Pomeranian Voivodeship	Saarow
Żary		Żary	Lubusz Voivodeship	Sorau
Zasieki	Brody	Żary	Lubusz Voivodeship	Forst-Berge
Zatonie	Gmina Zielona Góra	Zielona Góra County	Lubusz Voivodeship	Günthersdorf
Zawadzkie	Zawadzkie	Strzelce	Opole Voivodeship	Zawadzki
Zawadzkie	Zawadzkie	Strzelce	Opole Voivodeship	Andreashütte
Zbąszynek	Zbąszynek	Świebodzin	Lubusz Voivodeship	Neu Bentschen
Zduńska Wola		Zduńska Wola	Łódź Voivodeship	Freihaus
Zduny	Zduny	Krotoszyn	Greater Poland Voivodeship	Treustädt
Zdzieszowice	Zdzieszowice	Krapkowice	Opole Voivodeship	Deschowitz
Zdzieszowice	Zdzieszowice	Krapkowice	Opole Voivodeship	Odertal in Oberschlesien
Zielona Góra			Lubusz Voivodeship	Grünberg in Schlesien
Złocieniec	Złocieniec	Drawsko	West Pomeranian Voivodeship	Falkenburg
Złotnik	Żary	Żary	Lubusz Voivodeship	Reinswalde
Złotoryja		Złotoryja	Lower Silesian Voivodeship	Goldberg
Złotów		Złotów	Greater Poland Voivodeship	Flatow
Żmigród	Żmigród	Trzebnica	Lower Silesian Voivodeship	Trachenberg
Żółwin, Międzyrzecz County	Międzyrzecz	Międzyrzecz	Lubusz Voivodeship	Solben
Żory			Silesian Voivodeship	Sohrau
Żubrów	Sulęcin	Sulęcin	Lubusz Voivodeship	Herzogswalde
Żydowo, Lubusz Voivodeship	Trzciel	Międzyrzecz	Lubusz Voivodeship	Elisenfelde
Żytni Młyn	Brody	Żary	Lubusz Voivodeship	Heideschäfer

=== Natural locations ===
Polish name	German name	Type	Notes
Brda	Brahe	River	
Długie	Lang	Lake	
Kortowskie	Kort	Lake	
Liwa	Liebe	River	
Łyna	Alle	River	
Nogat	Nogat	River	
Noteć	Netze	River	
Sukiel	Suckel	Lake	
Szkarpawa	Elbinger Weichsel	River	
Tuja	Tiege	River	
Track	Trautziger	Lake	
Ukiel	Okull	Lake	
Wadąg	Wadang	Lake	
Wadąg	Wadang	River	
Barania Góra	Widderberg	Mountain	
Wisła	Weichsel	River	In English known as the Vistula, the longest river in Poland.
Zalew Wiślany	Frisches Haff	Lagoon	In English known as the Vistula Lagoon.

== See also ==
- German exonyms
- List of Polish exonyms for places in Germany
- List of European exonyms
- List of cities and towns in East Prussia
- List of places in Cieszyn Silesia
- List of placenames in the Province of Pomerania
- Commission for the Determination of Place Names
