= List of the German exonyms in the Lower Silesian Voivodeship =

This is a list of German language names for places in Lower Silesian Voivodeship in south-west Poland. This region was part of Kingdom of Prussia since 1742, and Germany from 1871 to 1945 (see History of Silesia).

Polish	German
Bielawa	Langenbielau
Bogatynia	Reichenau
Boguszów-Gorce	Gottesberg-Rothenbach
Bolesławiec	Bunzlau
Bukówka	Buchwald
Dzierżoniów	Reichenbach
Głogów	Glogau, rarely Groß-Glogau
Groblice	Grebelwitz
Jarkowice	Hermsdorf Städtisch
Jawor	Jauer
Jelenia Góra	Hirschberg im Riesengebirge
Kamienna Góra	Landeshut
Kąty Wrocławskie	Kanth
Kłodzko	Glatz
Legnica	Liegnitz
Lubawka	Liebau
Lubin	Lüben
Miszkowice	Michelsdorf
Niemcza	Nimptsch
Nowa Ruda	Neurode
Nowogrodziec	Naumburg am Queis
Oława	Ohlau
Oleśnica	Oels or Öls
Pieszyce	Peterswaldau
Polkowice	Polkwitz; 1937–1945 Heerwegen
Przemków	Primkenau
Sobótka	Zobten
Strzegom	Striegau
Strzelin	Strehlen
Świdnica	Schweidnitz
Świdnik	Streckenbach
Świebodzice	Freiburg in Schlesien
Szalejów Dolny	Niederschwedeldorf
Wałbrzych	Waldenburg
Wiązów	Wansen
Wrocław	Breslau
Ząbkowice Śląskie	Frankenstein in Schlesien
Zgorzelec	Görlitz
Złotoryja	Goldberg
Złoty Stok	Reichenstein
Żarów	Saarau
Żmigród	Trachenberg

== See also ==
List of German names for places in Poland
