= Jasienica, Lubusz Voivodeship =

Jasienica
- Village
- Location within Poland
- Coordinates: 51°50′N 14°48′E
- Country: Poland
- Voivodeship: Lubusz
- County: Żary
- Gmina: Brody

Jasienica [jaɕɛˈnit͡sa] (Lower Sorbian: Jazynica) is a village in the administrative district of Gmina Brody, within Żary County, Lubusz Voivodeship, in western Poland, close to the German border.
