= Brody, Żary County =

Brody
- Town
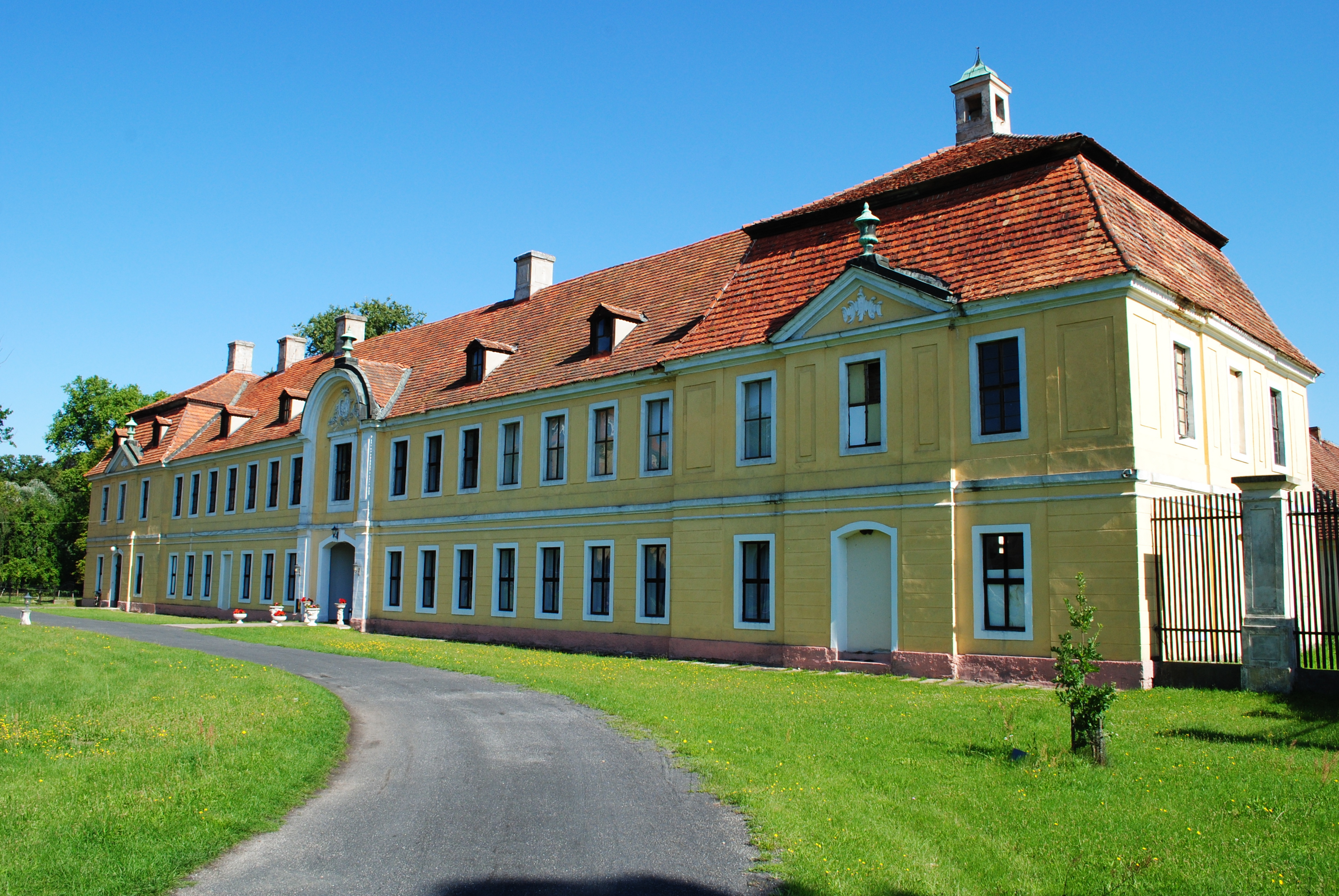
- Outbuilding of the Brühl Palace

- Coat of arms

- Location within Poland
- Coordinates: 51°47′25″N 14°46′26″E
- Country: Poland
- Voivodeship: Lubusz
- County: Żary
- Gmina: Brody

Population (2017)
  - Total: 969
- Time zone: UTC+1 (CET)
  - Summer (DST): UTC+2 (CEST)
- Postal code: 68-343
- Area code: +48 68
- Vehicle registration: FZA

Brody (Polish pronunciation: [ˈbrɔdɨ]) is a town in Żary County, Lubusz Voivodeship, in western Poland, close to the German border. It is the seat of the gmina (administrative district) called Gmina Brody.

== History ==
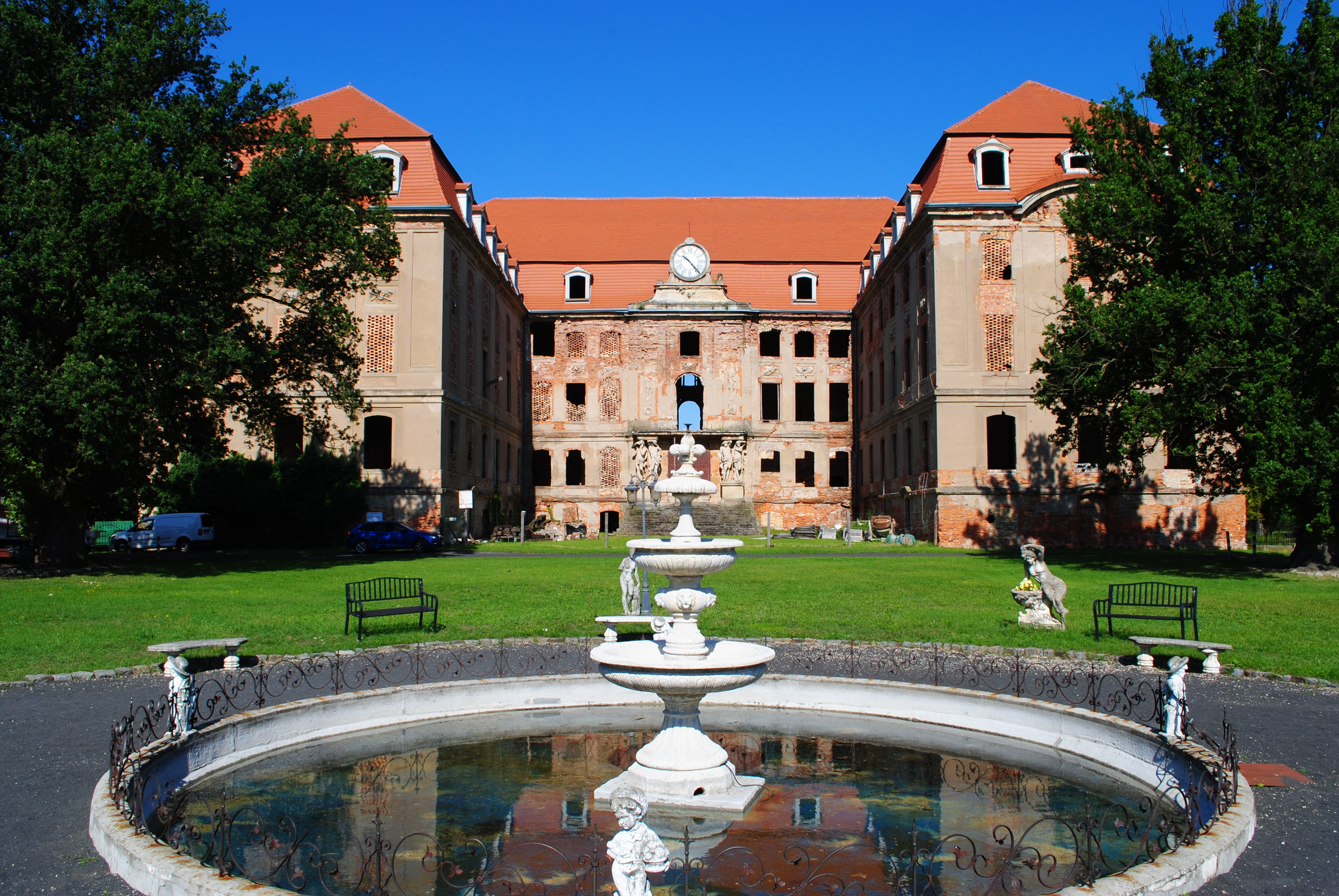
Palace

The village was mentioned in 1398. It was granted town rights in 1454. With the historic Lower Lusatia region it passed from the Kingdom of Bohemia to the Electorate of Saxony by the 1635 Peace of Prague. From 1697 it was also under the suzerainty of Polish kings in personal union. From 1740 it was a possession of the powerful Polish–Saxon statesman Heinrich von Brühl, who had an extended Baroque palace built, where he received King Augustus III of Poland and kept his famous Meissen porcelain Swan Service tableware of more than 2,000 pieces designed by Johann Joachim Kaendler. There was also a library and an archaeological collection. One of the main routes connecting Warsaw and Dresden ran through the town. In 1748, the Zasiecka Gate was built on the occasion of the arrival of King Augustus III.

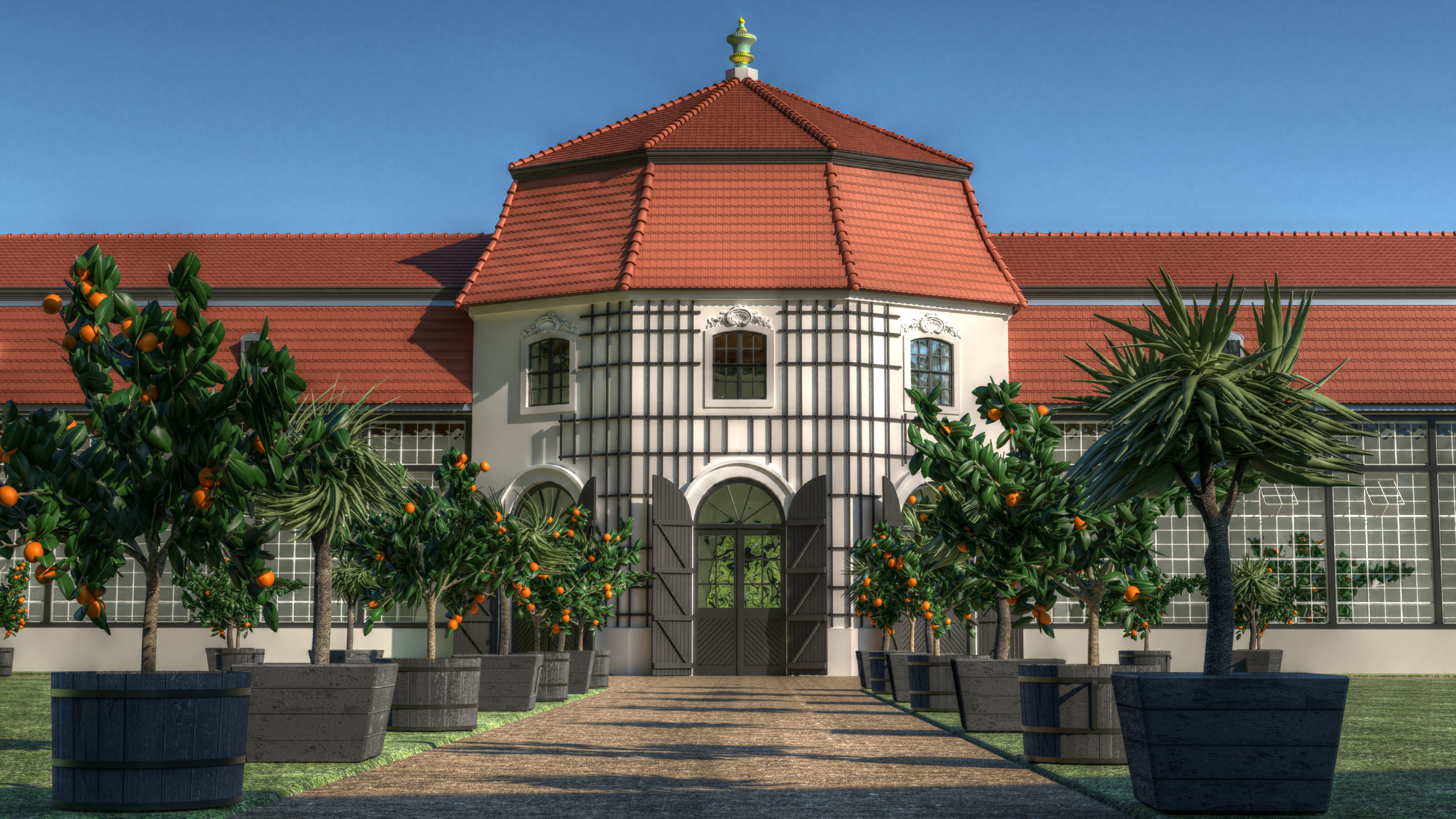
A 3D reconstruction of the Brühl Estate Orangery in Brody (Formerly Pförten)

The palace was devastated by Prussian troops by the explicit command of King Frederick II of Hohenzollern during the Seven Years' War. After the Prussian occupation it passed to Polish diplomat, General and poet Alois Friedrich von Brühl, who spent his last years there. In 1790 the small town gained prominence throughout Europe, after Brühl staged Shakespeare's A Midsummer Night's Dream at the palace park.

By the Final Act of the Vienna Congress in 1815 Brody (then as Pförten) with Lower Lusatia fell to Prussia and stayed part of Germany until 1945. The Brühl Palace, again ravaged by the Red Army, has in parts been rebuilt. After the war it became part of Poland (see Territorial changes of Poland after World War II). In 1949, the post-war library was founded.

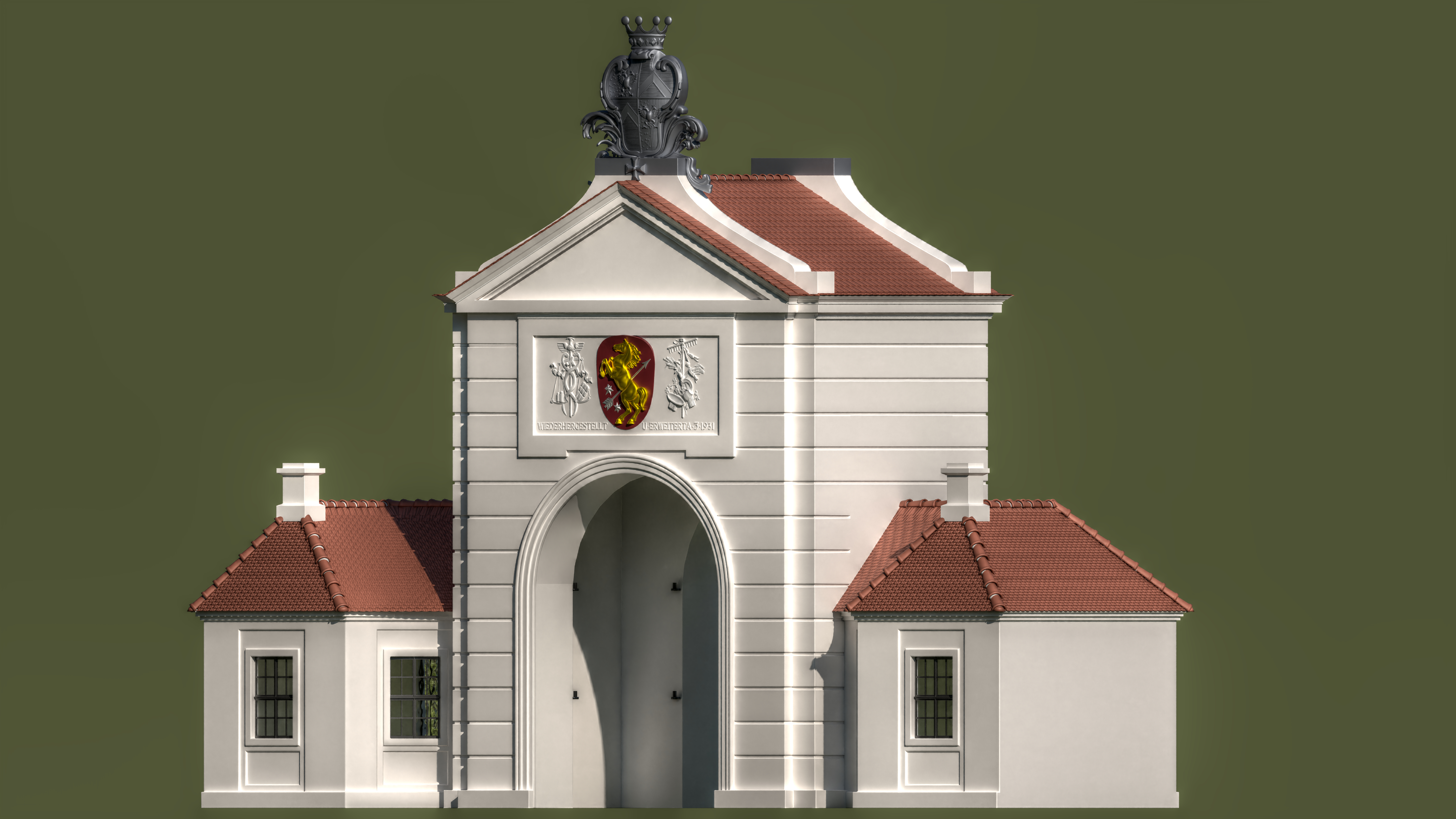
This 3D rendering reveals how the original town gate of Brody (formerly Pförten) might have looked, based on the original blueprint by Knöffel.

== Demographics ==
Historical population

| Year | Pop. | ±% |
|---|---|---|
| 1816 | 953 | — |
| 1843 | 958 | +0.5% |
| 1871 | 976 | +1.9% |
| 1880 | 988 | +1.2% |
| 1890 | 992 | +0.4% |

| Year | Pop. | ±% |
|---|---|---|
| 1900 | 1,080 | +8.9% |
| 1910 | 1,035 | −4.2% |
| 1925 | 1,151 | +11.2% |
| 1939 | 1,123 | −2.4% |

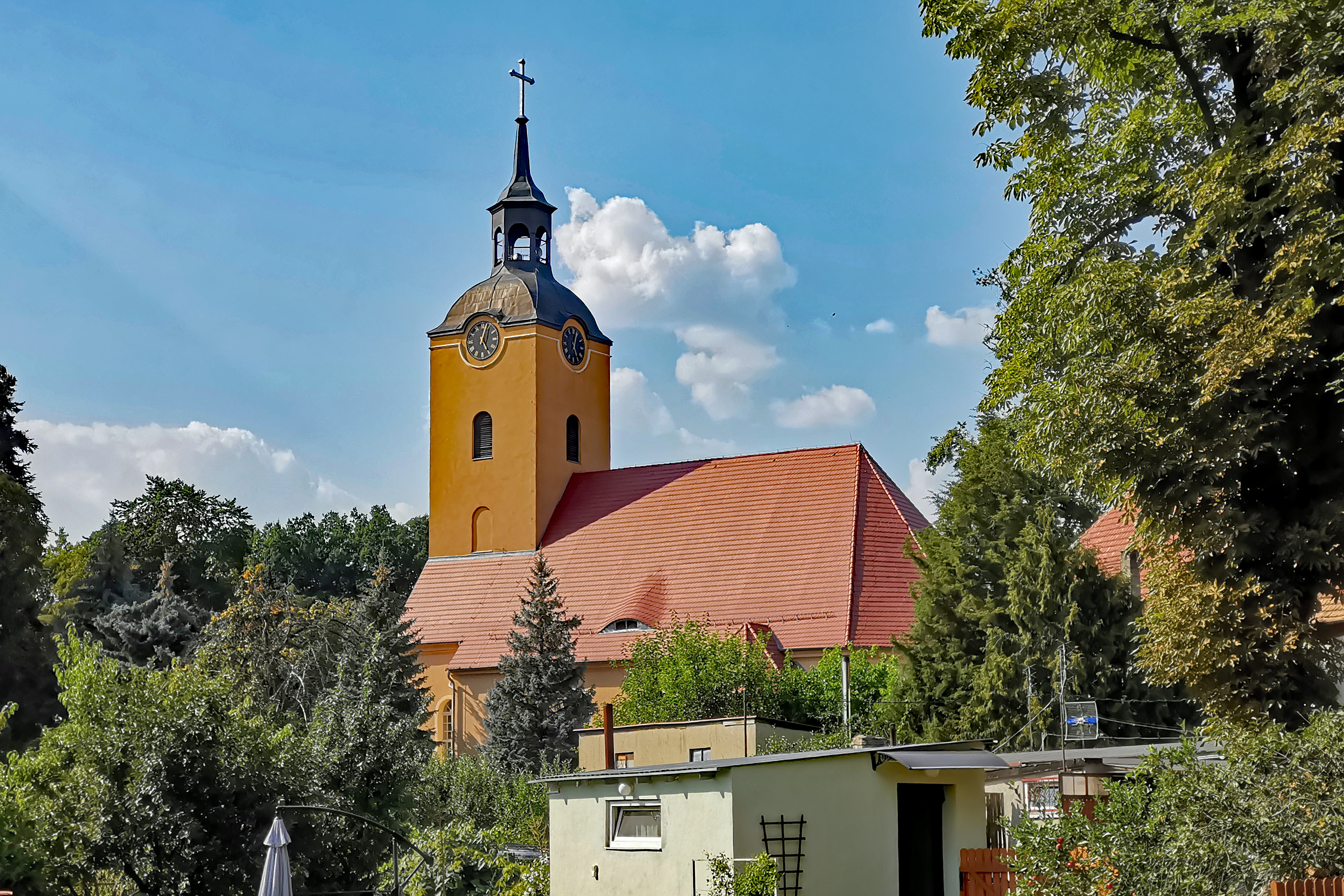
Baroque All Saints church

== Notable people ==
- Carl von Brühl (1772–1837)
- Theresia Anna Maria von Brühl (1784–1844)
- Hermann Ulrici (1806–1884), philosopher
- Friedrich-August Graf von Brühl (1913–1981), Wehrmacht officer

== International relations ==
=== Twin towns — Sister cities ===
Brody is twinned with:

- Lubsko, Poland
