= Koło, Lubusz Voivodeship =

Koło
- Village
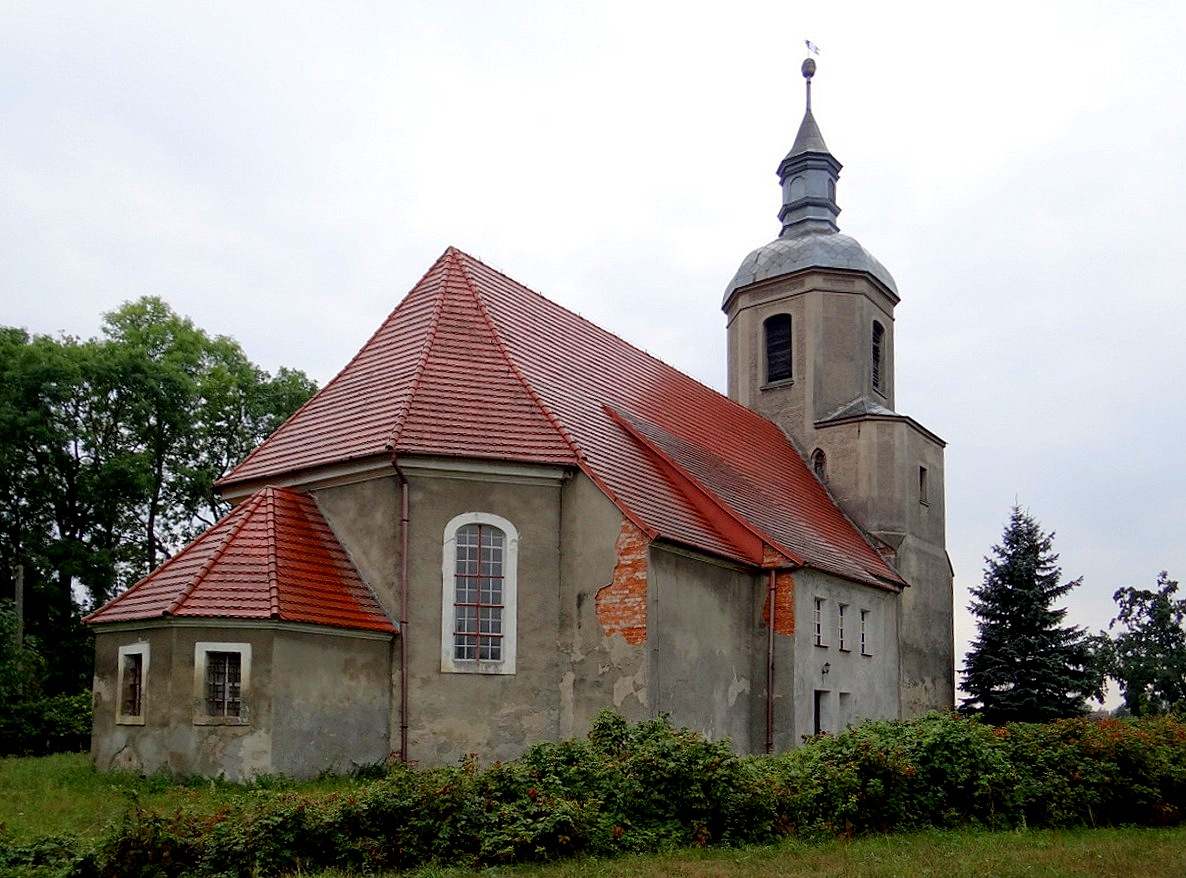
- Catholic church

- Location within Poland
- Coordinates: 51°50′15″N 14°46′43″E
- Country: Poland
- Voivodeship: Lubusz
- County: Żary
- Gmina: Brody
- Population: 320

Koło [ˈkɔwɔ] (Lower Sorbian: Rad) is a village in the administrative district of Gmina Brody, within Żary County, Lubusz Voivodeship, in western Poland, close to the German border.

Count Friedrich August von Brühl Memorial Cross (1856)
