= Theresia Anna Maria von Brühl =

German painter

Theresia Anna Maria von Brühl, Gräfin von Thun und Hohenstein (1784–1844) was a German noblewoman and pastellist.

== Early life ==
Born in Pförten, today the village of Brody, Żary County, von Brühl was the daughter of Aloys Friedrich Joseph Graf von Brühl (1739–1793) and his wife Josepha Christina Amalie von Schaffgotsch genannt Semperfrei von und zu Kynast und Greiffenstein (1764–1846), and therefore a niece of the patroness Tina von Brühl.

== Biography ==
It seems unlikely that she was working before 1800; the earliest to which any of her pieces can be ascribed is 1803. One of her pastels is a Vestal copied after a work by Angelica Kauffman that is today in the Gemäldegalerie, Dresden; another, a Sybil, bears some resemblance to a painting by Anton Rafael Mengs.

== Marriage ==
In 1808 she married Franz Anton, Count von Thun und Hohenstein (1786–1873), the son of Count Wenzel Joseph von Thun und Hohenstein (1737–1796) and his wife, Countess Maria Anna von Kolowrat-Liebsteinsky (1750–1828). They had three sons and two daughters.
