= Laski, Żary County =

Laski
- Settlement
- Location within Poland
- Coordinates: 51°52′09″N 14°51′52″E
- Country: Poland
- Voivodeship: Lubusz
- County: Żary
- Gmina: Brody
- Population: 16

Laski (Polish pronunciation: [ˈlaskʲi]) is a settlement in the administrative district of Gmina Brody, within Żary County, Lubusz Voivodeship, in western Poland, close to the German border.
