= Nabłoto =

- Village
- Location within Poland
- Coordinates: 51°47′N 14°46′E
- Country: Poland
- Voivodeship: Lubusz
- County: Żary
- Gmina: Brody

Nabłoto [naˈbwɔtɔ] is a village in the administrative district of Gmina Brody, within Żary County, Lubusz Voivodeship, in western Poland, close to the German border.
