= Grodziszcze, Żary County =

Grodziszcze
- Village
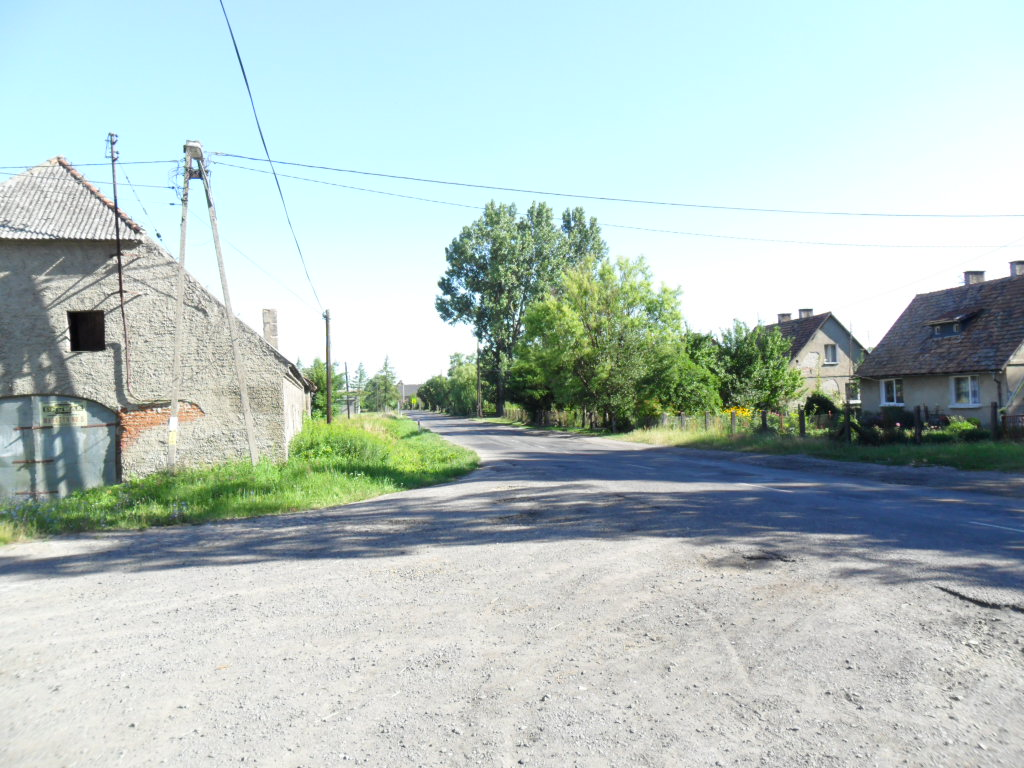

- Location within Poland
- Coordinates: 51°49′N 14°49′E
- Country: Poland
- Voivodeship: Lubusz
- County: Żary
- Gmina: Brody

Grodziszcze [ɡrɔˈd͡ʑiʂt͡ʂɛ] is a village in the administrative district of Gmina Brody, within Żary County, Lubusz Voivodeship, in western Poland, close to the German border.
