= Brożek =

- Village
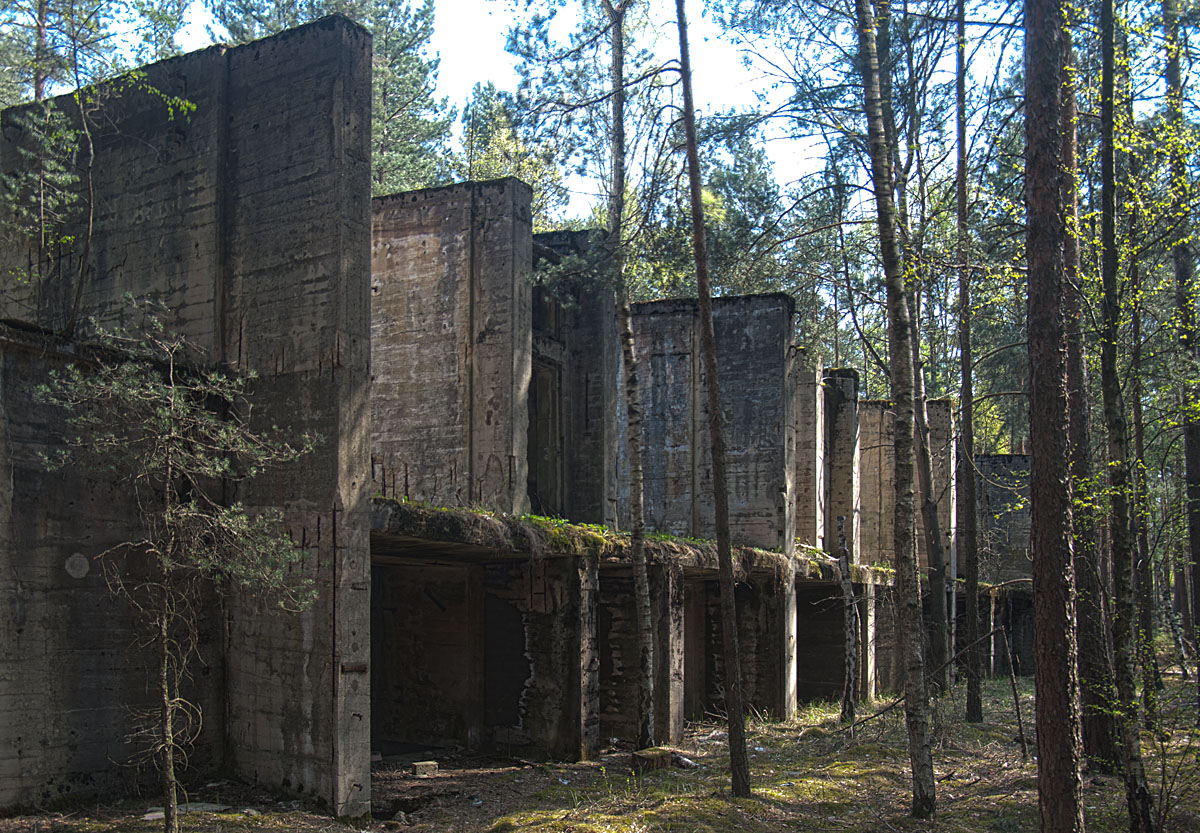

- Location within Poland
- Coordinates: 51°43′N 14°41′E
- Country: Poland
- Voivodeship: Lubusz
- County: Żary
- Gmina: Brody

Brożek ([ˈbrɔʐɛk]; Lower Sorbian: Brožek) is a village in the administrative district of Gmina Brody, within Żary County, Lubusz Voivodeship, in western Poland, close to the German border.
