= Proszów, Lubusz Voivodeship =

Proszów
- Settlement
- Location within Poland
- Coordinates: 51°45′6″N 14°48′59″E
- Country: Poland
- Voivodeship: Lubusz
- County: Żary
- Gmina: Brody
- Population: 25

Proszów [ˈprɔʂuf] (Lower Sorbian: Prošow) is a settlement in the administrative district of Gmina Brody, within Żary County, Lubusz Voivodeship, in western Poland, close to the German border.
