= Kumiałtowice =

- Village
- Location within Poland
- Coordinates: 51°49′N 14°44′E
- Country: Poland
- Voivodeship: Lubusz
- County: Żary
- Gmina: Brody
- Population: 151

Kumiałtowice [kumjau̯tɔˈvit͡sɛ] is a village in the administrative district of Gmina Brody, within Żary County, Lubusz Voivodeship, in western Poland, close to the German border.
