= Janiszowice, Żary County =

Janiszowice
- Village
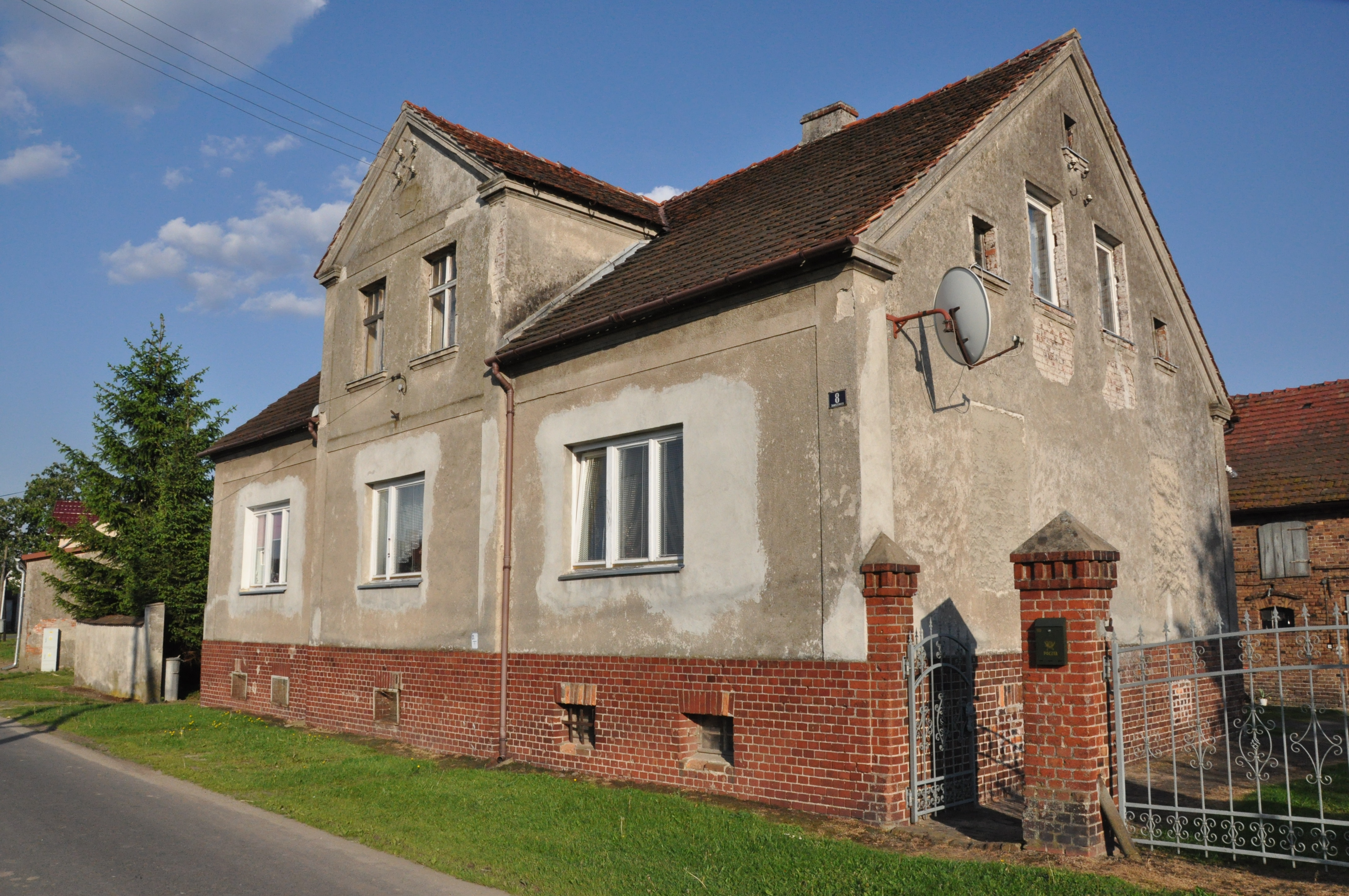

- Location within Poland
- Coordinates: 51°47′31″N 14°39′34″E
- Country: Poland
- Voivodeship: Lubusz
- County: Żary
- Gmina: Brody
- Population: 52

Janiszowice ([janiʂɔˈvit͡sɛ]; German: Jähnsdorf) is a village in the administrative district of Gmina Brody, within Żary County, Lubusz Voivodeship, in western Poland, close to the German border.
