= Wierzchno, Lubusz Voivodeship =

Wierzchno Wirchenblatt
- Village
- Location within Poland
- Coordinates: 51°51′N 14°46′E
- Country: Poland
- Voivodeship: Lubusz
- County: Żary
- Gmina: Brody
- Population: 70

Wierzchno [ˈvjɛʂxnɔ] (Lower Sorbian: Górjej; Upper Sorbian: Horje) is a village in the administrative district of Gmina Brody, within Żary County, Lubusz Voivodeship, in western Poland, close to the German border.
