= Suchodół, Lubusz Voivodeship =

Suchodół
- Village
- Location within Poland
- Coordinates: 51°47′43″N 14°43′54″E
- Country: Poland
- Voivodeship: Lubusz
- County: Żary
- Gmina: Brody
- Population: 70

Suchodół (Polish pronunciation: [suˈxɔduw]) is a village in the administrative district of Gmina Brody, within Żary County, Lubusz Voivodeship, in western Poland, close to the German border.
