= Jeziory Dolne =

- Village
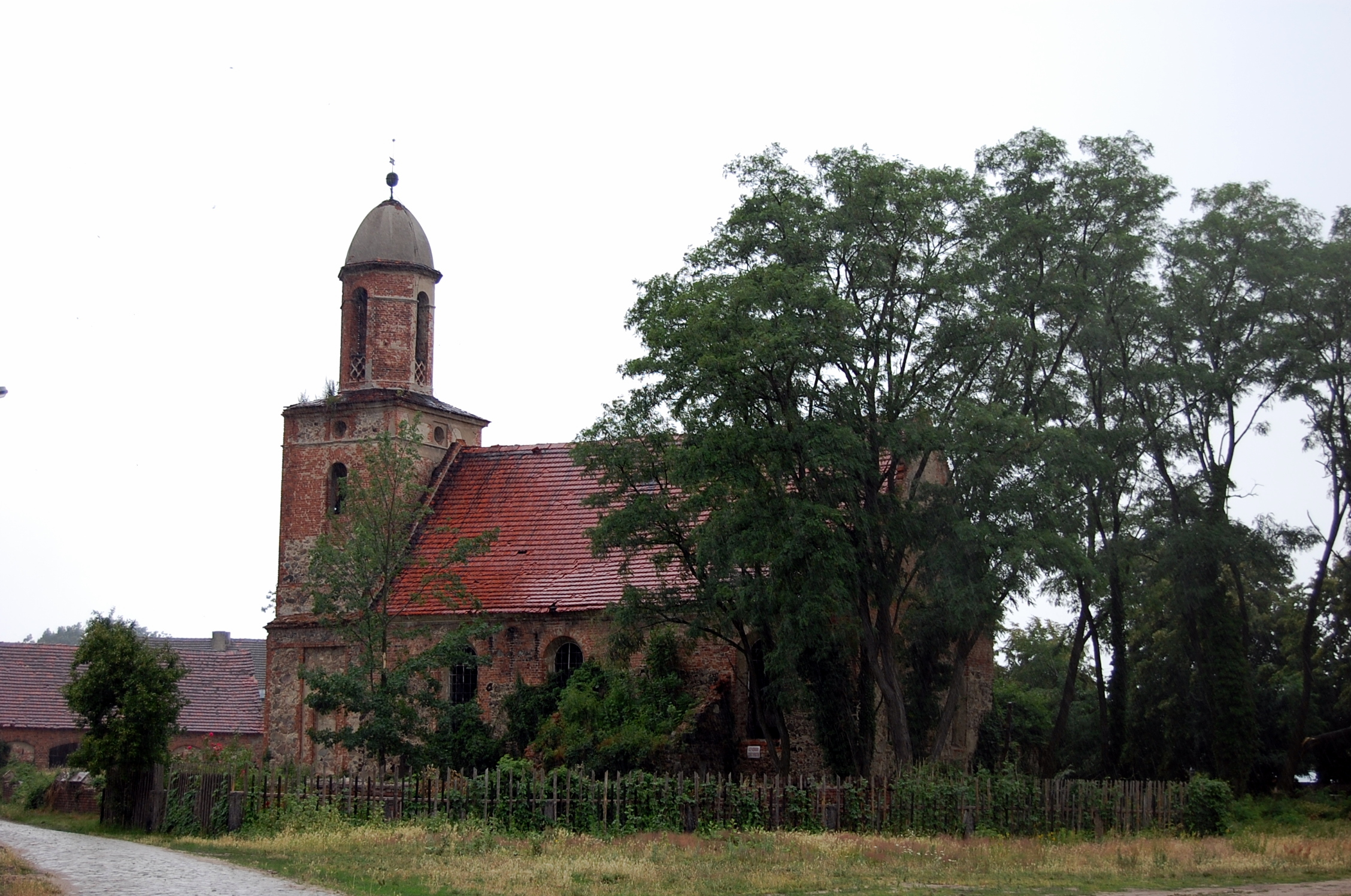
- Former Protestant church

- Location within Poland
- Coordinates: 51°47′51″N 14°45′10″E
- Country: Poland
- Voivodeship: Lubusz
- County: Żary
- Gmina: Brody
- Population: 165

Jeziory Dolne [jɛˈʑɔrɨ ˈdɔlnɛ] (Lower Sorbian: Dolne Jazory; Upper Sorbian: Delne Jězory) is a village in the administrative district of Gmina Brody, within Żary County, Lubusz Voivodeship, in western Poland, close to the German border.
