= Marianka, Lubusz Voivodeship =

Marianka
- Village
- Location within Poland
- Coordinates: 51°45′55″N 14°43′54″E
- Country: Poland
- Voivodeship: Lubusz
- County: Żary
- Gmina: Brody
- Population: 92

Marianka [maˈrjanka] is a village in the administrative district of Gmina Brody, within Żary County, Lubusz Voivodeship, in western Poland, close to the German border.
