= Żytni Młyn =

- Settlement
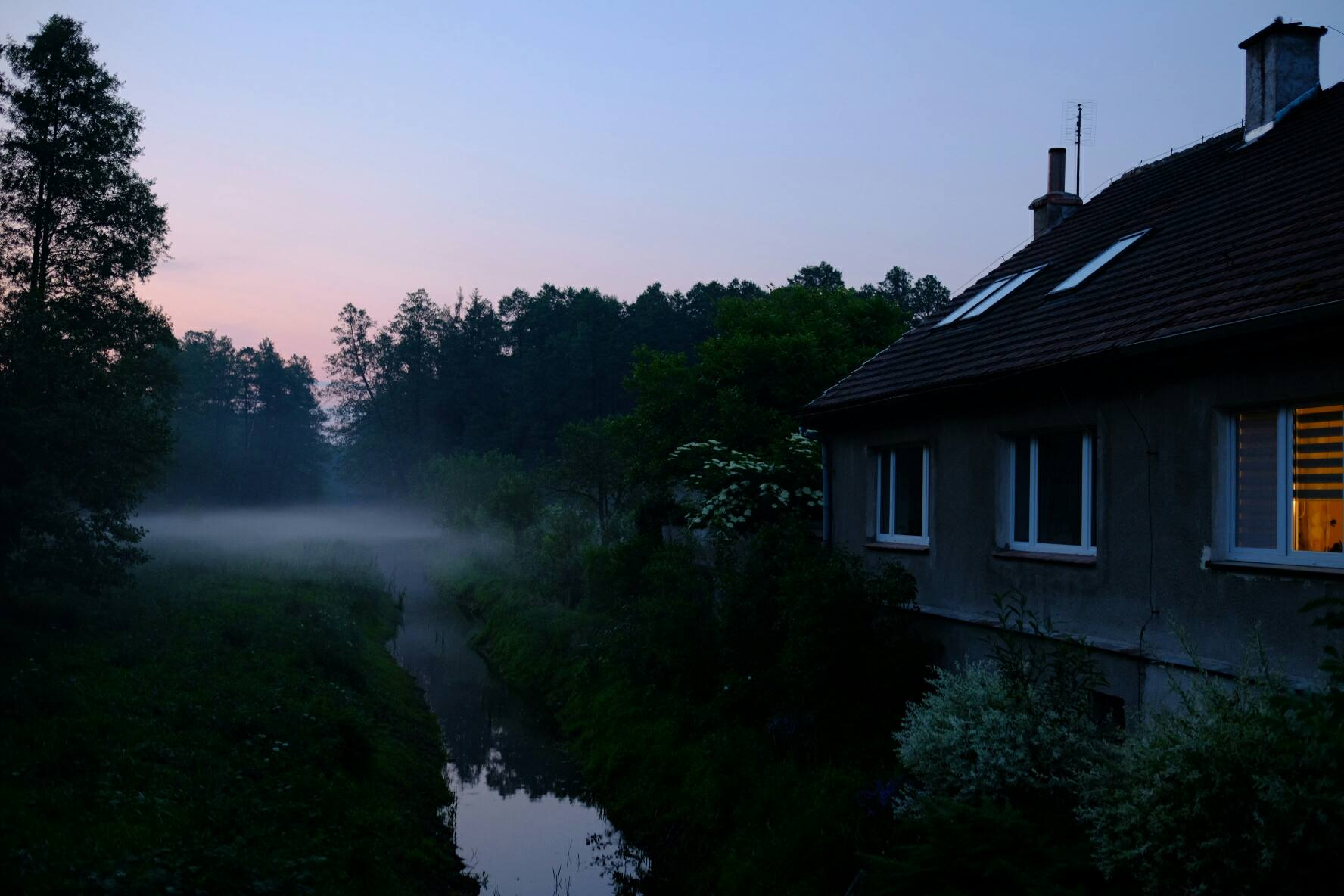

- Location within Poland
- Coordinates: 51°45′51″N 14°49′29″E
- Country: Poland
- Voivodeship: Lubusz
- County: Żary
- Gmina: Brody
- Population: 7

Żytni Młyn [ˈʐɨtni ˈmwɨn] (Lower Sorbian: Rožkowy Młyn; Upper Sorbian: Rožk) is a settlement in the administrative district of Gmina Brody, within Żary County, Lubusz Voivodeship, in western Poland, close to the German border.
