= Wadąg =

- Settlement
- Location within Poland
- Coordinates: 53°49′N 20°32′E
- Country: Poland
- Voivodeship: Warmian-Masurian
- County: Olsztyn
- Gmina: Dywity

Wadąg [ˈvadɔnk] is a settlement in the administrative district of Gmina Dywity, within Olsztyn County, Warmian-Masurian Voivodeship, in northern Poland. It lies on the river Wadąg, close to the city of Olsztyn.
