= Biecz, Lubusz Voivodeship =

Biecz
- Village
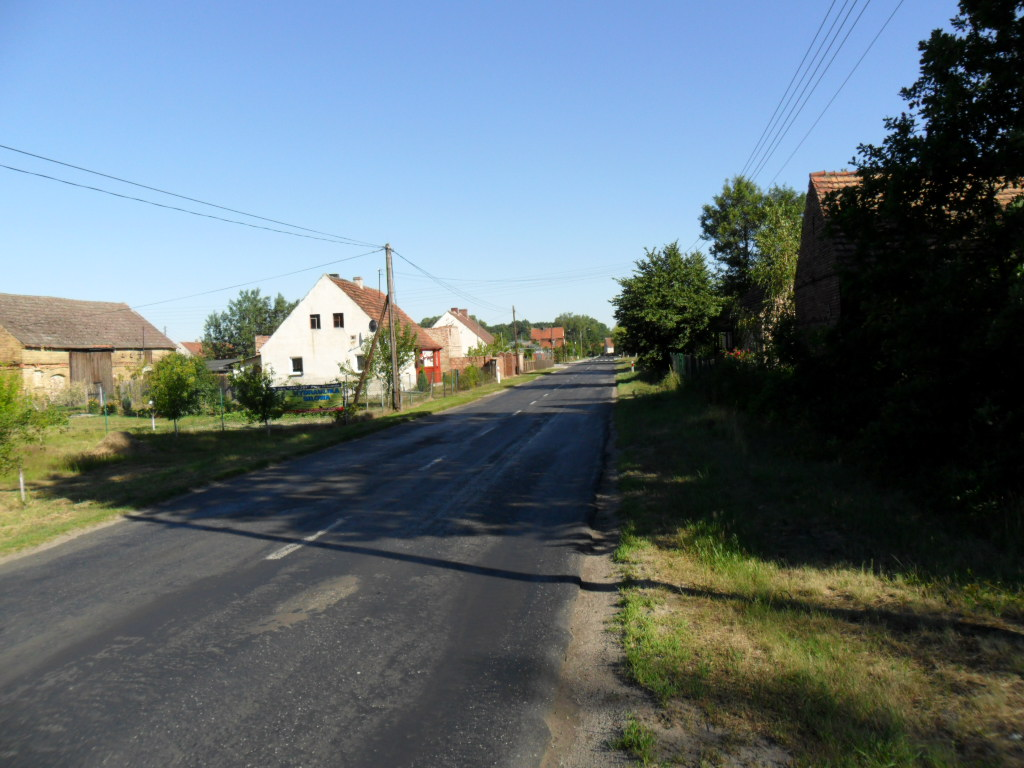

- Location within Poland
- Coordinates: 51°48′N 14°50′E
- Country: Poland
- Voivodeship: Lubusz
- County: Żary
- Gmina: Brody
- Population: 252

Biecz ([bjɛt͡ʂ]; Lower Sorbian: Bječ) is a village in the administrative district of Gmina Brody, within Żary County, Lubusz Voivodeship, in western Poland, close to the German border.

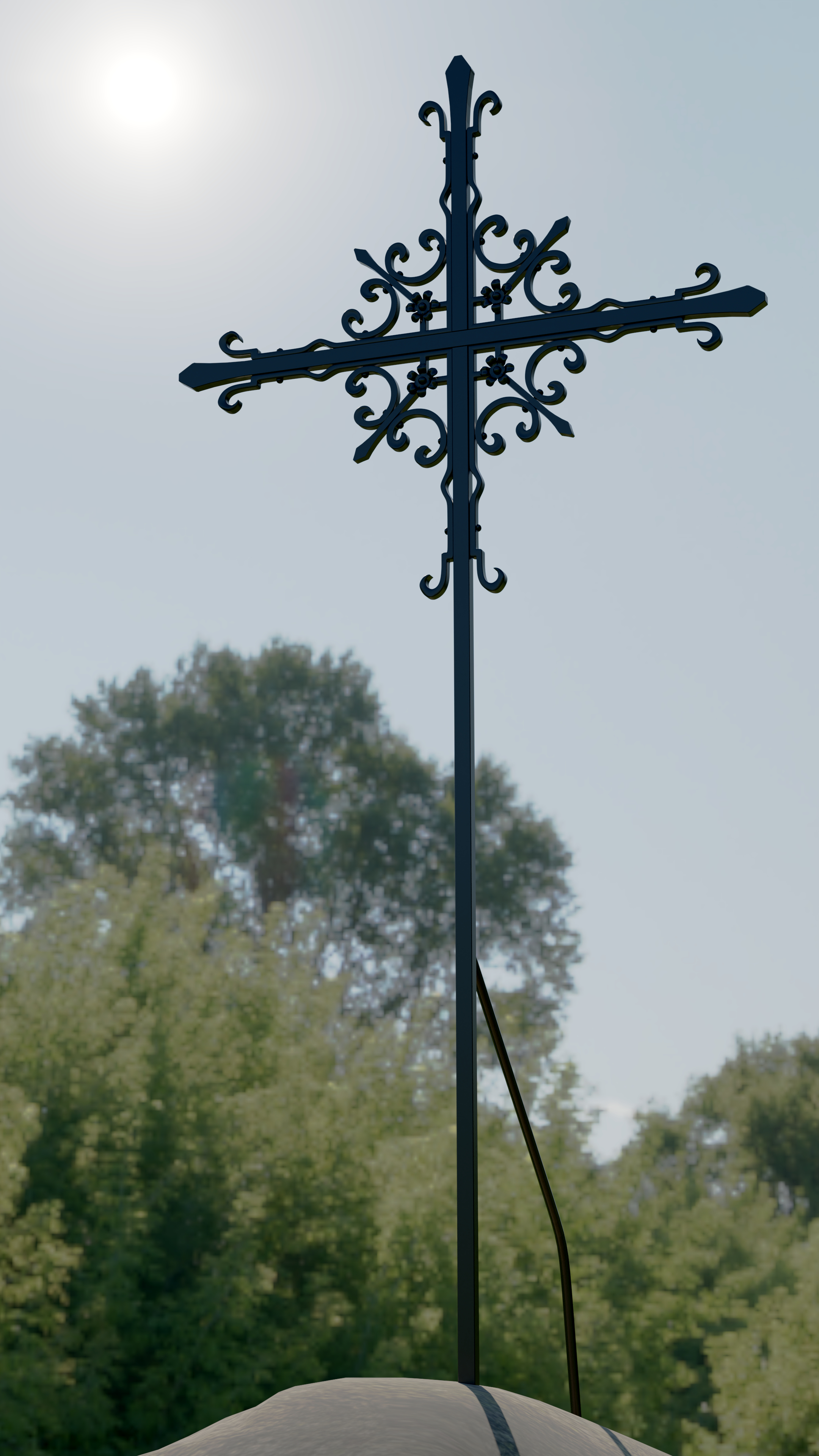
A fieldside memorial cross set into a large natural boulder.
