= Gmina Brody, Lubusz Voivodeship =

Gmina Brody Brody Commune
- Gmina
- Coat of arms
- Interactive map of Gmina Brody
- Coordinates (Brody): 51°47′25″N 14°46′26″E
- Country: Poland
- Voivodeship: Lubusz
- County: Żary
- Seat: Brody

Area
  - Total: 240.36 km^{2} (92.80 sq mi)

Population (2019-06-30)
  - Total: 3,413
  - Density: 14.20/km^{2} (36.78/sq mi)
- Website: http://www.brody.pl

Gmina Brody is a rural gmina (administrative district) in Żary County, Lubusz Voivodeship, in western Poland, on the German border. Its seat is the village of Brody, which lies approximately 31 kilometres (19 mi) north-west of Żary and 53 km (33 mi) west of Zielona Góra.

The gmina covers an area of 240.36 square kilometres (92.8 sq mi), and as of 2019 its total population is 3,413.

The gmina contains part of the protected area called Muskau Bend Landscape Park.

== Villages ==
Gmina Brody contains the villages and settlements of Biecz, Brody, Brożek, Datyń, Grodziszcze, Jałowice, Janiszowice, Jasienica, Jeziory Dolne, Koło, Kumiałtowice, Laski, Marianka, Nabłoto, Proszów, Suchodół, Wierzchno, Zasieki and Żytni Młyn.

== Neighbouring gminas ==
Gmina Brody is bordered by the gminas of Gubin, Lubsko, Trzebiel and Tuplice. It also borders Germany.

== Twin towns – sister cities ==
Gmina Brody is twinned with:

- Forst, Germany
- Lubsko, Poland
