= Wadąg (river) =

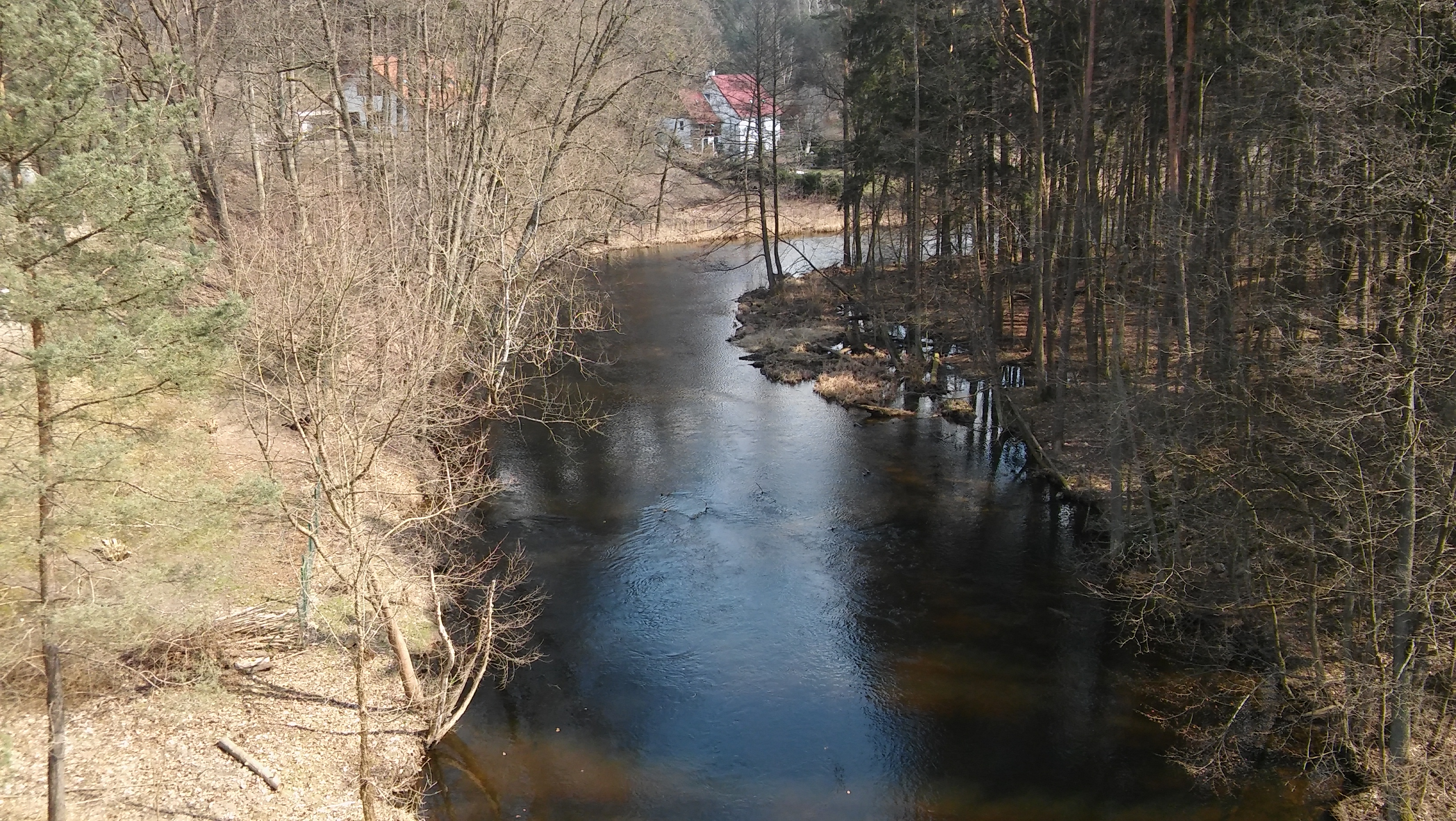

Location
- Country: Poland

Physical characteristics
- Mouth
  - location: Łyna
  - coordinates: 53.8131°N 20.4567°E

Basin features
- Progression: Łyna→ Pregolya→ Baltic Sea

Wadąg river is a tributary of the Łyna in Poland. It starts from Wadąg Lake and flows into the Łyna near the city of Olsztyn. It has an overall length of 68 kilometres. It shares its name with the settlement of Wadąg through which it flows.
