= Szalejów Dolny =

- Village
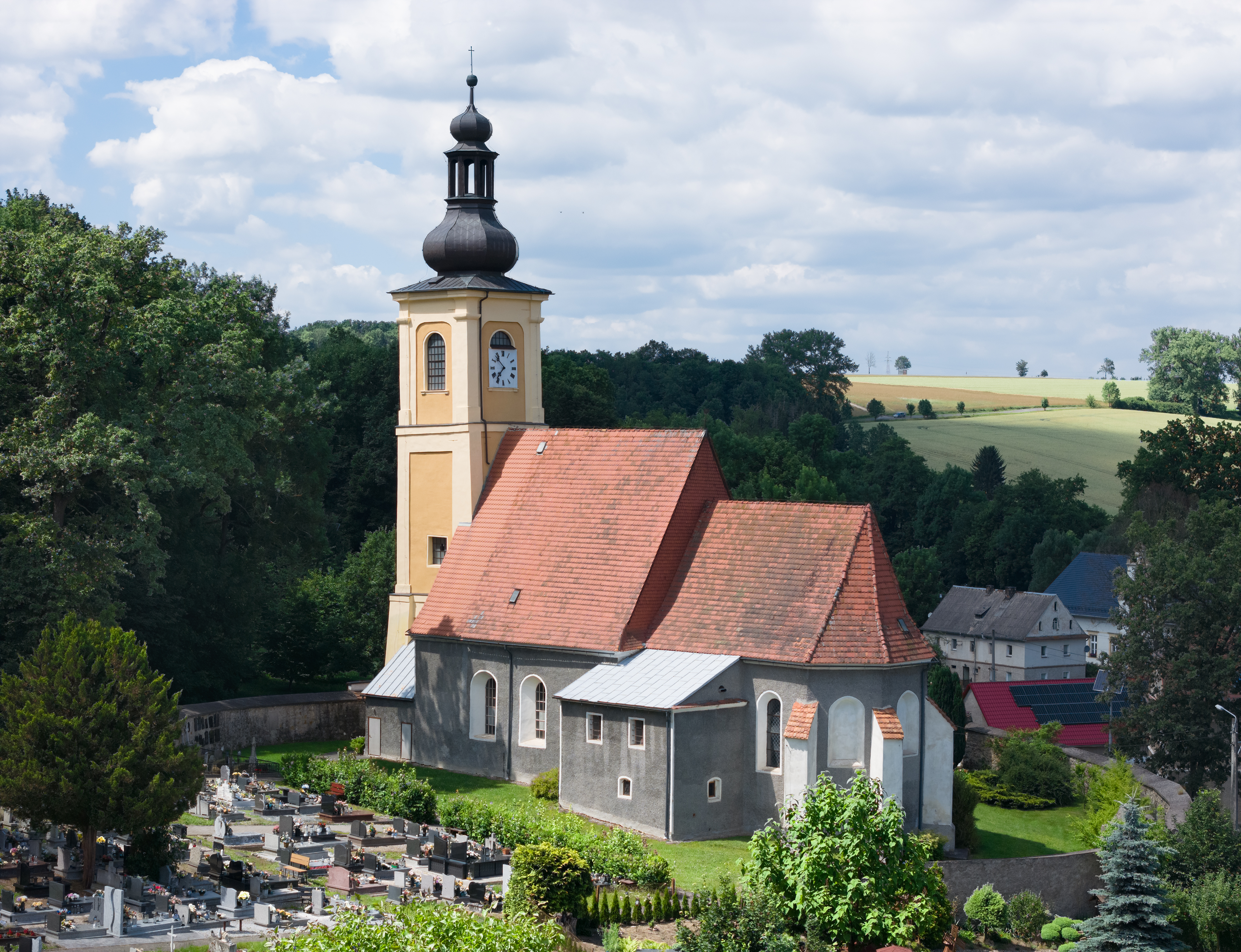
- Saints Simon and Jude church in Szalejów Dolny

- Location within Poland
- Coordinates: 50°25′N 16°36′E
- Country: Poland
- Voivodeship: Lower Silesian
- County: Kłodzko
- Gmina: Kłodzko
- Time zone: UTC+1 (CET)
  - Summer (DST): UTC+2 (CEST)
- Vehicle registration: DKL

Szalejów Dolny [ʂaˈlɛjuf ˈdɔlnɨ] is a village in the administrative district of Gmina Kłodzko, within Kłodzko County, Lower Silesian Voivodeship, in south-western Poland. It is located in Kłodzko Land.

== Gallery ==
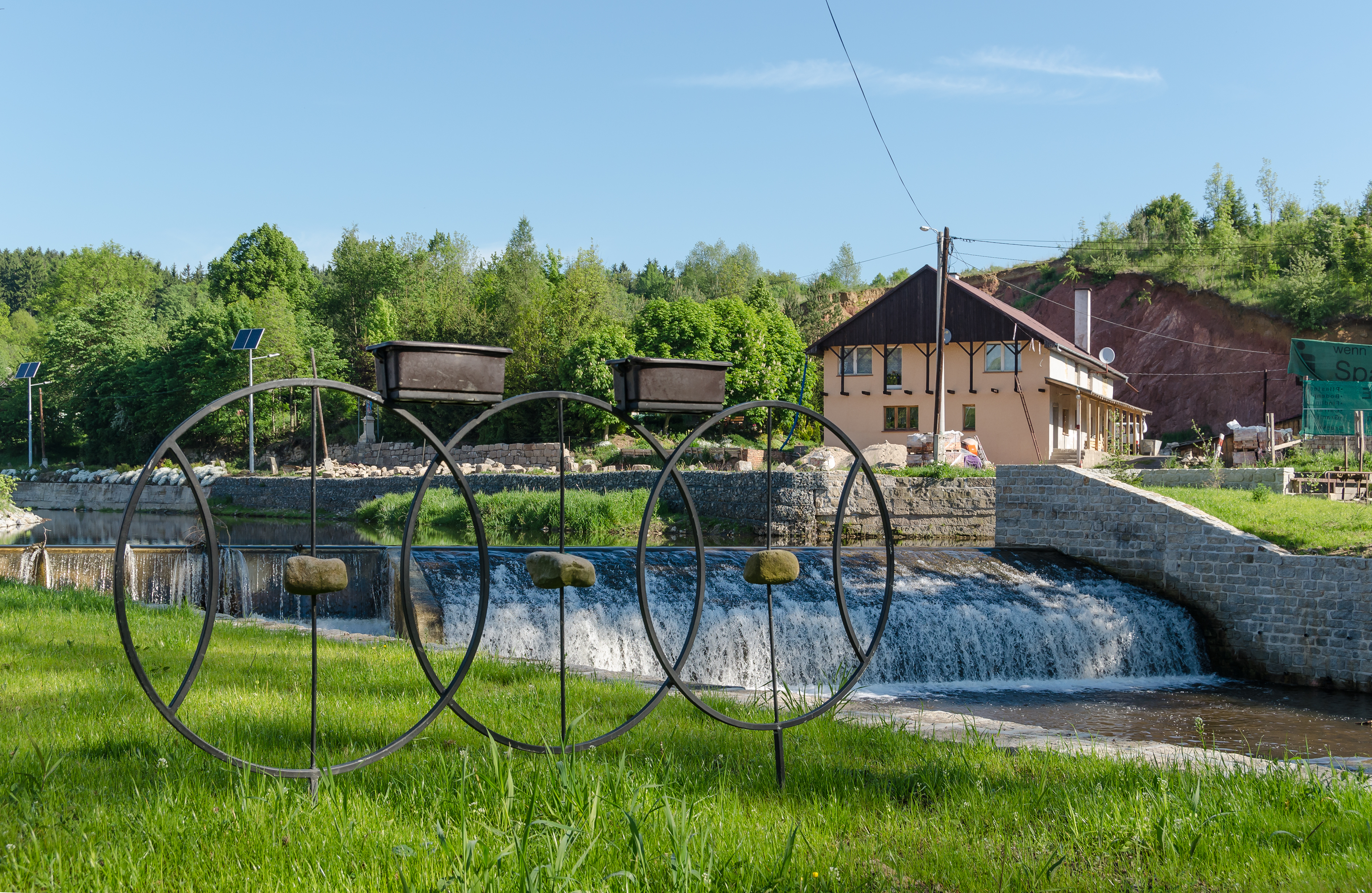
Bystrzyca Dusznicka River in Szalejów dolny
