= Jarkowice =

- Village
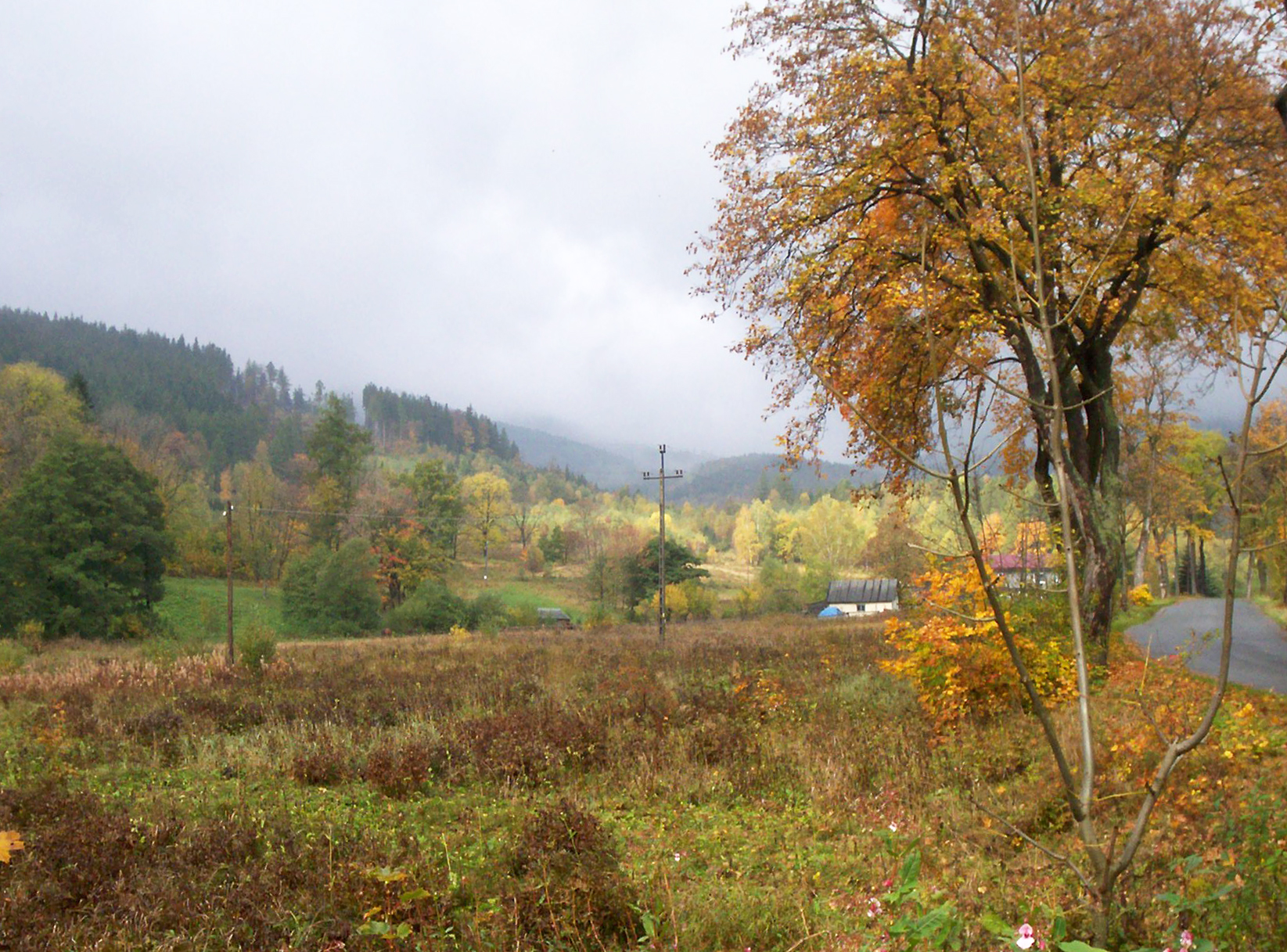
- Jarkowice

- Location within Poland
- Coordinates: 50°43′13″N 15°53′59″E
- Country: Poland
- Voivodeship: Lower Silesian
- County: Kamienna Góra
- Gmina: Lubawka
- Population: 440

Jarkowice [jarkɔˈvit͡sɛ] (German: Hermsdorf) is a village in the administrative district of Gmina Lubawka, within Kamienna Góra County, Lower Silesian Voivodeship, in south-western Poland.
