= Groblice =

- Village
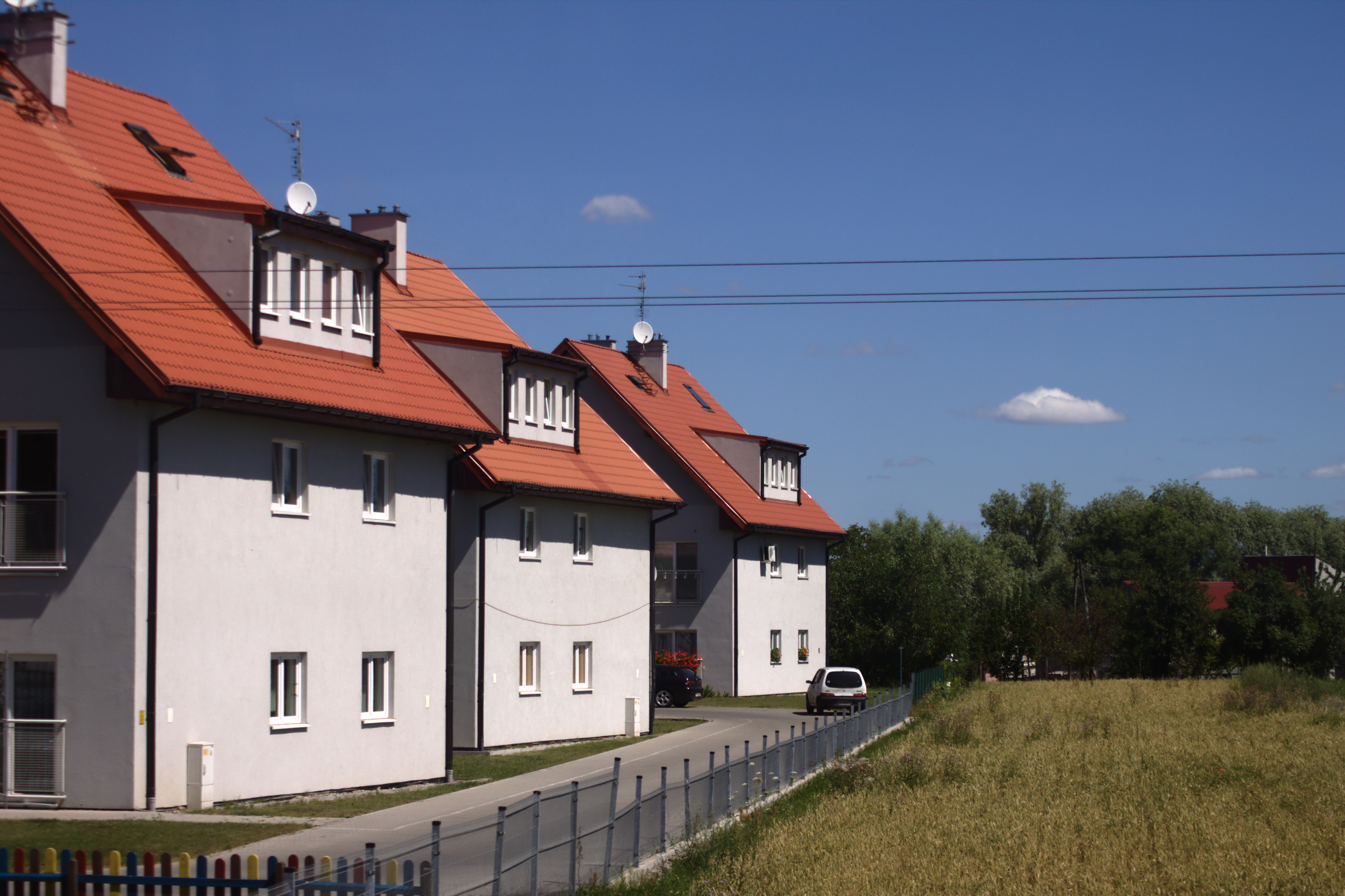
- Houses in Groblice

- Location within Poland
- Coordinates: 51°00′44″N 17°10′28″E
- Country: Poland
- Voivodeship: Lower Silesian
- County: Wrocław
- Gmina: Siechnice
- Time zone: UTC+1 (CET)
  - Summer (DST): UTC+2 (CEST)

Groblice ([ɡrɔˈblit͡sɛ], German: Grebelwitz) is a village in the administrative district of Gmina Siechnice, within Wrocław County, Lower Silesian Voivodeship, in south-western Poland.

In 1945, in the village, the Germans ordered the first stop of the "death march" of several thousand prisoners from the subcamp in Miłoszyce to the Gross-Rosen concentration camp.

There is a medieval conciliation cross in the village.
