= Herwigsdorf =

Herwigsdorf can refer to

- Stypułów
- a village in Rosenbach, Görlitz
