= Alojzy Wojtowicz =

- Born: 27 December 1918; Hanaczów, Poland
- Died: 13 December 1992 (aged 73); Nowa Sól
- Burial place: Mirocin Górny
- Military career
- Allegiance: Polish Home Army
- Service years: 1939-1945
- Rank: Podporucznik
- Nicknames: „Jurand”, „Głowacki”

Alojzy Wojtowicz (codename: "Jurand", "Głowacki"; born December 27, 1918, in Hanaczów; died December 13, 1992, in Nowa Sól) – a lieutenant in the Polish Home Army, a member of the Polish Freedom and Independence Association, a participant in the defense of Hanaczów, and a Righteous Among the Nations. After World War II, he became the director of a school in Mirocin Górny.

== Childhood and Youth ==
He was born on December 27, 1918, in Hanaczów (currently part of village Hanachivka, Ukraine), Przemyślany County, Second Polish Republic. The son of Szczepan (born in 1880) and Katarzyna (née Prochera, born in 1889), he had two brothers: Antoni and Kazimierz. In his youth, he attended the III State Gymnasium named after Stefan Batory in Lwów, where he obtained his secondary school diploma. He then studied veterinary medicine at the University of Lwów.

== After the Outbreak of World War II ==
Due to the outbreak of the war, Alojzy Wojtowicz interrupted his studies at the University of Lwów during his first year (he never completed them) and was called up to the National Defense as a squad leader to combat German sabotage. After the September Campaign, he helped establish the military organization Service for Poland's Victory. He was sworn in in November 1939 and appointed as the deputy commander of the Service for Poland's Victory district in Hanaczów. In September 1939, he hid two police officers and one Polish Army officer in his parents' farm.

He organized aid for the families of officers and Polish intelligentsia who were at risk of deportation to the USSR. In mid-1940, he delivered messages and food to Polish soldiers interned in the camp in Podsosnowie. After the outbreak of the German-Soviet war, Alojzy Wojtowicz prepared an action on June 26, 1941, against the NKVD guards escorting Polish prisoners of war deep into the USSR. Some Polish Army soldiers managed to escape.

In the autumn of 1941, he co-founded the Union of Armed Struggle Hanaczów District. In mid-1942, he hid Jews from Hanaczów who were marked for deportation to ghettos by the Germans. In early 1943, he participated in several sabotage actions, including an attack on the German and Ukrainian police station in Podhoryszcze, where large quantities of weapons were seized, and the burning of German grain stacks in Przemyślany County. A few days after the grain was burned, SS units appeared in the Przemyślany area, forcing the partisan unit to retreat into the Romanów-Kocurów forests. As a result, Alojzy Wojtowicz had to hide over 80 Jews in Hanaczów. When, on September 2, 1943, SS units conducted a pacification operation in the Hanaczów-Świr forests, they failed to find either the partisans or a large number of Jewish people. Only about 8 Jews, who had not managed to escape from the forest, were likely found.

He participated in the first defense of Hanaczów, co-led the defense of the rectory with S. Dietrich, and provided first aid to the wounded. He was part of the Hanaczów defense headquarters. In November 1944, he commanded a unit attacking a German military convoy near Słowita. Alojzy Wojtowicz also assisted Nikolai Kuznetsov's sabotage group, which carried out an assassination attempt on Vice Governor Bauer in Lwów.

During the second attack on Hanaczów, Alojzy collected the wounded from the battlefield and treated them. On April 11, 1944, he escorted severely wounded soldiers from Hanaczów to Lwów. After an attack on an SS unit on April 20, 1944, he fell ill with typhus and was appointed by Major Anatol Sawicki as an intelligence officer in a sabotage unit. On April 16, 1945, at the request of Major Anatol Sawicki, he was awarded the Silver Cross of the Order of Virtuti Militari. In June 1945, he graduated from the officer cadet school with the rank of second lieutenant.

During Operation Tempest (Akcja Burza), after two weeks of cooperation with the Red Army units in liberating the territories southeast of Lwów, his unit was disarmed. Alojzy then began using the false name Jan Brzoza, which he had used during the German occupation.

== After the War ==
In December 1945, he participated in organizing the Extraterritorial Lwów District of Freedom and Independence, created to support Western allies in the event of war between them and the USSR. At the end of December 1945, he was appointed head of information and propaganda for the Extraterritorial Lower Silesian Inspectorate of the Freedom and Independence District, based in Wrocław. He co-created an intelligence network in Wrocław Voivodeship and part of Poznań Voivodeship. Some of the intelligence he gathered was passed to the Polish Government-in-Exile.

From 1946 to 1951, he studied history and philology at the University of Wrocław. Starting in 1946, he was a co-editor of the illegal newspaper "Niezależność" (Independence), published in Wrocław. After revealing his identity, he initially worked as a teacher and later as the director of the Primary and Agricultural School in Mirocin Górny and Kożuchów. In 1960, he obtained professional teaching qualifications by passing a simplified exam covering the teacher training program.

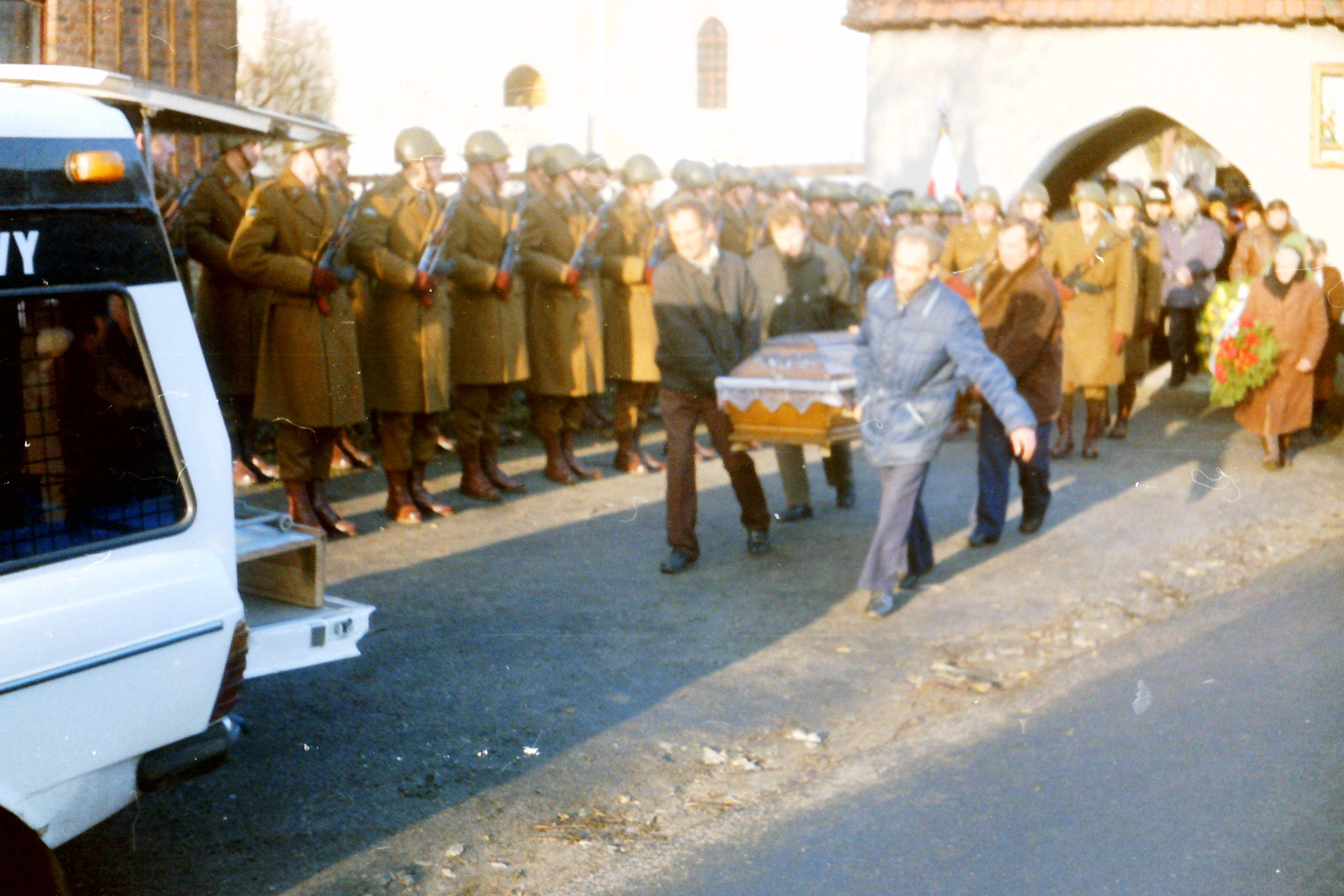
Funeral of Alojzy Wojtowicz in Mirocin Górny

In 1948, he married Teresa Wojtowicz (née Kirmałow), a liaison officer of the 2nd Regiment and 1st Cadre Brigade of the 5th Lwów Division. They had three children: Barbara (born April 12, 1949), Grzegorz (born March 8, 1953), and Tadeusz (born March 30, 1960).

In 1976, he joined the Union of Fighters for Freedom and Democracy and held the status of a combatant. In March 1992, he joined the World Union of Home Army Soldiers. In 1991, he was promoted to the rank of lieutenant. Together with his brother Antoni Wojtowicz, he wrote the book "Kronika Małej Ojczyzny w Lwowskim Okręgu" (Chronicle of the Small Homeland in the Lwów District), published in 1992.

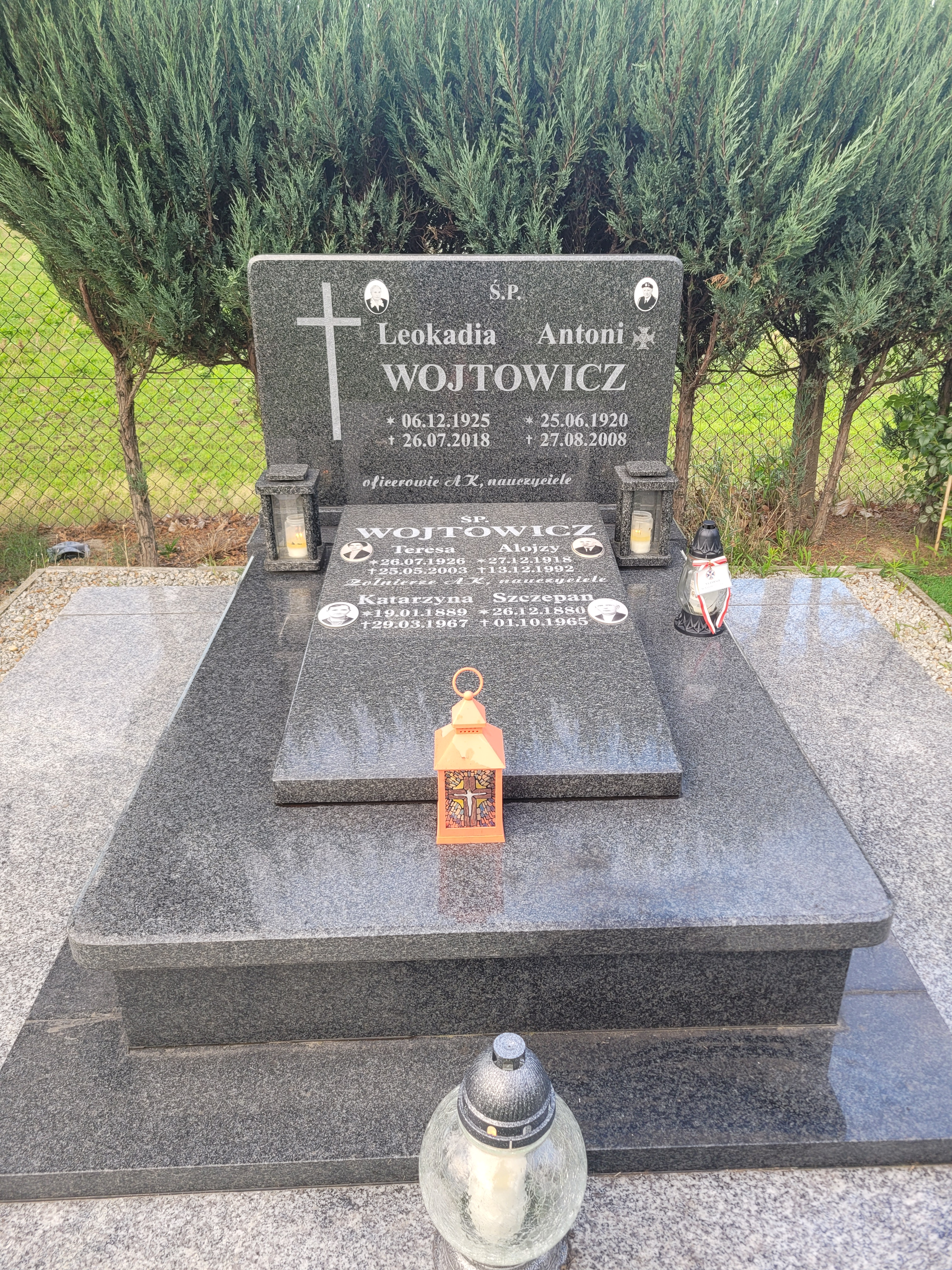
The family grave located in the cemetery in Mirocin Górny, where Alojzy Wojtowicz is buried

He died on December 13, 1992, and was buried with military honors at the cemetery in Mirocin Górny.

== Awards and Decorations ==
Alojzy Wojtowicz was honored with the following awards and decorations:

• Cross of Valour

• Home Army Cross

• Partisan Cross

• Cross of the II Defense of Lwów (Krzyż II Obrony Lwowa)

• WiN Cross (Krzyż WiN)

• Silver Cross of the Order of Virtuti Militari (1945)

• Knight's Cross of the Order of Polonia Restituta

• Golden Cross of Merit of the Polish People's Republic (Złoty Krzyż Zasługi PRL)

• Medal of the Armed Forces (Medal Wojska)

• Medal of the Righteous Among the Nations (1993)

• Medal for the 40th Anniversary of People's Poland (Medal 40-lecia Polski Ludowej)

• Honorary Badge for Merits in the Development of Zielona Góra Voivodeship (Odznaka „Honorowa za zasługi w rozwoju województwa Zielonogórskiego”)

• Badge of Merit for the Nowa Sól Land (Odznaka „Zasłużonego Obywatela Ziemi Nowosolskiej”)

• Badge for Merits to ZBoWiD (Odznaka „Za Zasługi dla ZBoWiD”)

• Badge of the 1000th Anniversary of the Polish State (Odznaka 1000-lecia Państwa Polskiego)
