= Mirocin Górny =

- Village
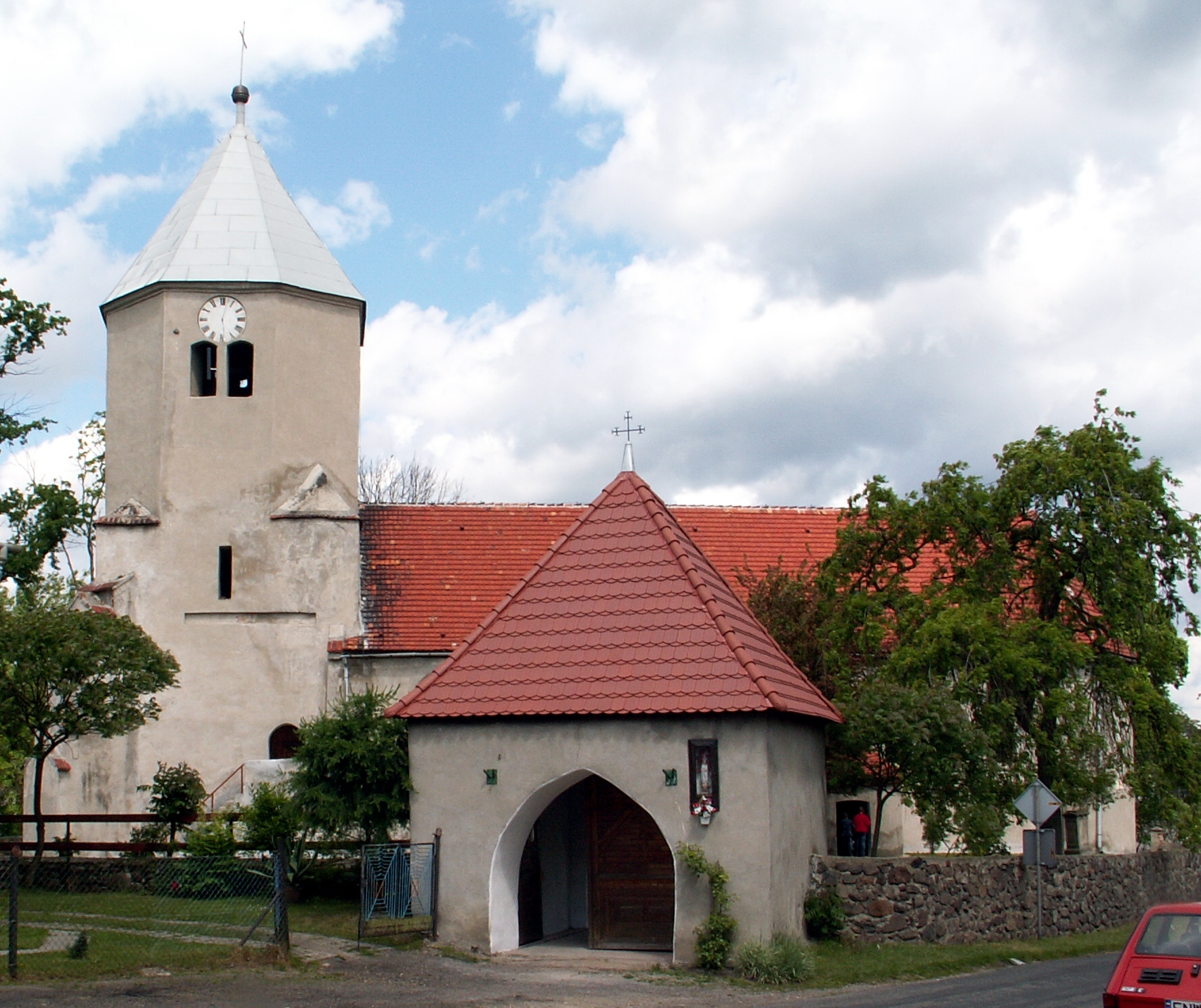
- Saint George Church

- Location within Poland
- Coordinates: 51°45′N 15°30′E
- Country: Poland
- Voivodeship: Lubusz
- County: Nowa Sól
- Gmina: Kożuchów
- Population: 603

Mirocin Górny [miˈrɔt͡ɕin ˈɡurnɨ] is a village in the administrative district of Gmina Kożuchów, within Nowa Sól County, Lubusz Voivodeship, in western Poland. It was known by its former name Herzogswaldau while in the Kingdom of Prussia.

== History ==
There are two archaeological sites in the village that are listed in the polish register of monuments. There are five Bronze Age barrow cemeteries in the vicinity of the village. Remnants of settlements belonging to the Lusatian culture can be found in the village vicinity.

The first mention of this part of the former village of Mirocin dates back to 1352 (parish priest Nicolaus). The village was incorporated in the 13th century. The village encompassed the surrounding parishes, and it was not until 1522 that the church in Mirocin Dolny was separated from it. In the 15th century, the church in Mirocin Górny was expanded and towers were added (a bell from 1489 has survived).

Subsequent owners of the village: Waltherius de Herzoginwalde (1321), Hantsche von Glaubitz (1417–1452), Hans Liedlau, Albrecht von Schlichting (1512), Ernest von Dyherrn and Nickel von Stosch (1535), Georg Gotthard von Dyherrn (1597), Carl von Schell, Julius Wilke (1937).

After World War II, a state-owned farm was established (It was established in the former farm buildings beloinging to the former owners of the village), which operated until the turn of the 1980s and 1990s.

From 1975 to 1998, the village was administratively part of the Zielona Góra Voivodeship.

After World War II, an agricultural school and a primary school were established in the village, with Alojzy Wojtowicz as its principal.

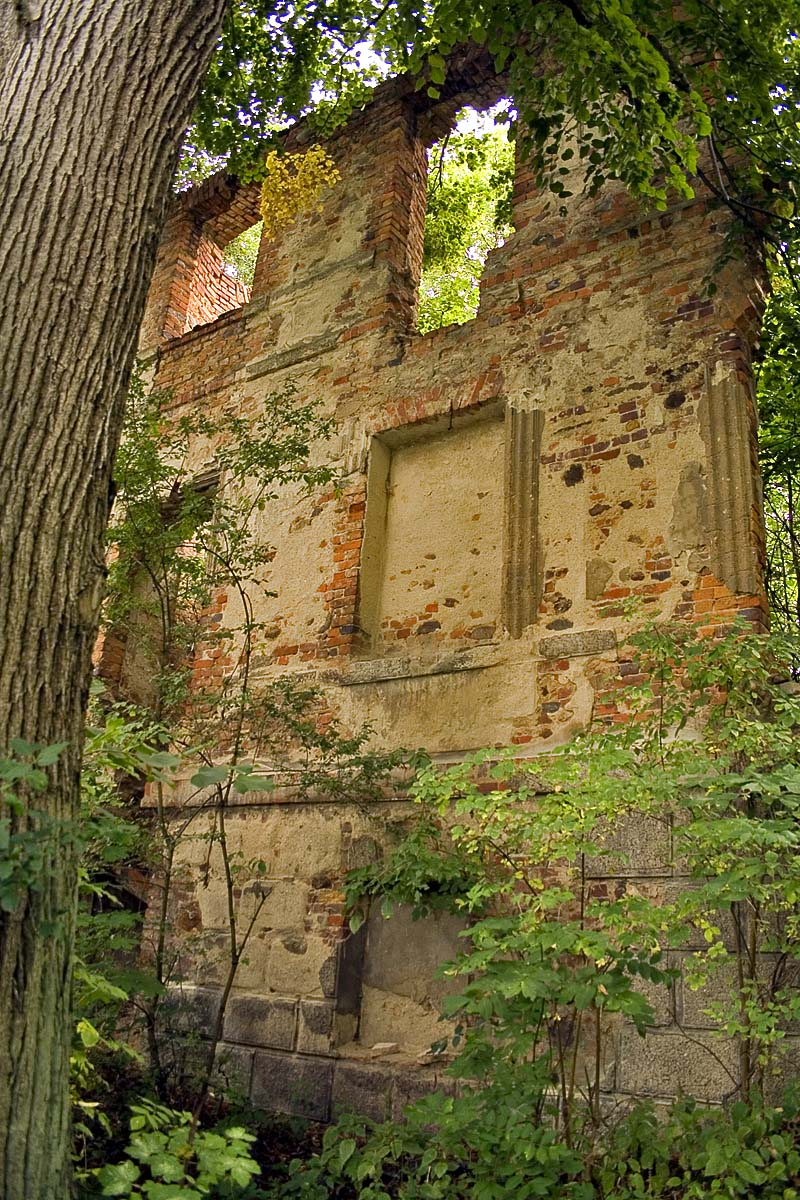
Ruins of Manor in Mirocin Górny built in the 18th century.

== Demographics ==
Number of inhabitants of the village in particular years:

Year	Number of Inhabitants
1791	667
1830	671
1840	778
1844	805
1905	611
1912	652
1998	628
2002	627
2009	635
2011	642
2021	603
