= Bulin =

- Village
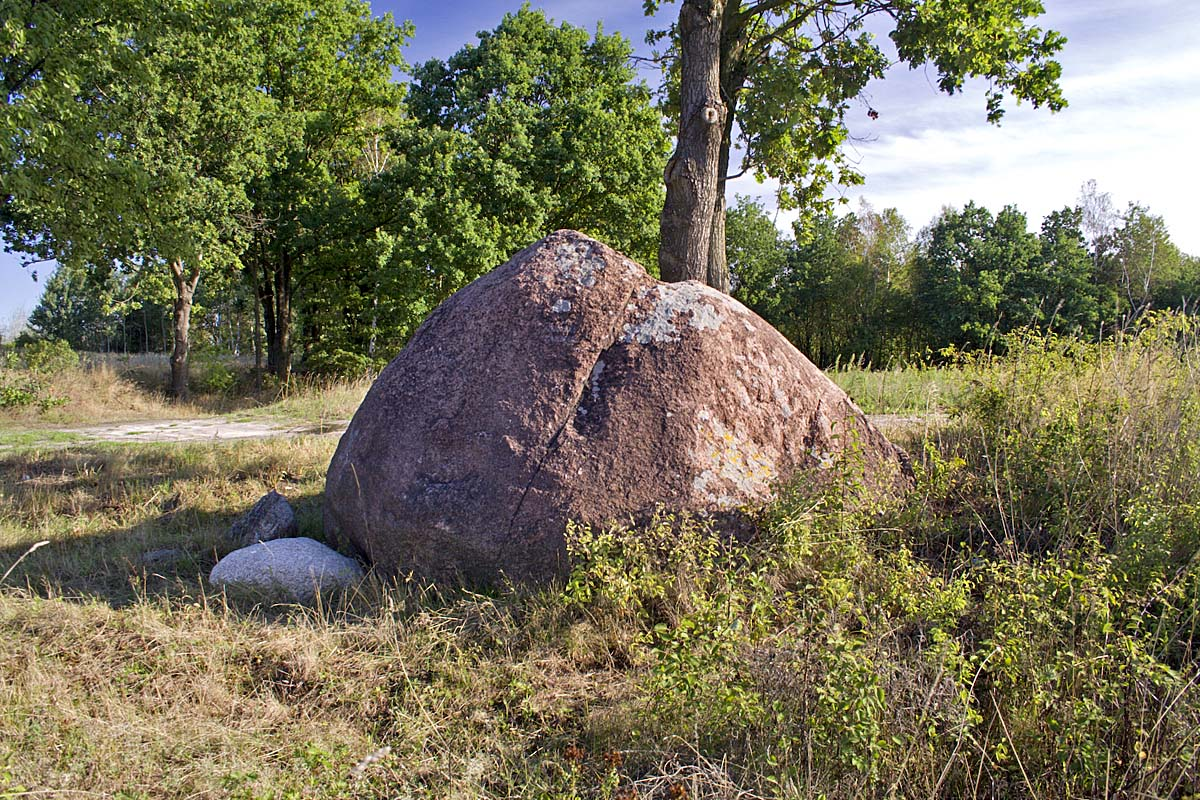

- Location within Poland
- Coordinates: 51°44′N 15°32′E
- Country: Poland
- Voivodeship: Lubusz
- County: Nowa Sól
- Gmina: Kożuchów
- Population: 18

Bulin [ˈbulin] (in past Bullendorf (1791), Bulndorf (1295), Błoniec) is a village in the administrative district of Gmina Kożuchów, within Nowa Sól County, Lubusz Voivodeship, in western Poland.

From 1975 to 1998, the town was administratively part of the Zielona Góra Voivodeship. Lubomir Matkowski is the village head.

== History ==
There is one archaeological site near the village from the Stone Age and one from the Bronze Age. A flint core from the Mesolithic period was found in Bulin. Near the village there is an archaeological site listed as a settlement in the polish register of historical monuments.

The first mention of the village of Bulin appears in documents from 1295. At the beginning of the 14th century, the village was owned by an unknown knight. The next owner, from 1338, was the knight Petrus Lybing, who, a few years later, transferred the village to the Augustinian Order from Żagań. This was confirmed by Henry V, Duke of Głogów-Żagań, in 1347, and again by Henry XI in 1476. In the 17th century, the mayor of Kożuchów, Johann Caspar John, owned Bulin.

In 1774, Bulin is mentioned in the register of the property of the Jesuit Order from Otyń. After the secularization of the order at the end of the 18th century, the village became the property of the nobility. In 1765, the village was valued at 3,378 thalers. In 1791, Bulin was consisting of, among other things, a windmill, two farms (freeholds), and a manor farm. Six craftsmen and three gardeners also lived there. In 1830, the village had 18 houses and a wooden castle. Bulin had a population of 102 at that time. In the mid-19th century, the village had a windmill, eighteen houses, a watermill, and a farm. A small manor house was built in 1868 by the von Czettrz-Neuhauss family. The last owner before World War II was Feliks Neubert.

After the war, a small state farm stood here, and the manor house was used for both administrative and residential purposes. The manor house is now privately owned and houses an agritourism farm.

== Demographics ==
Number of inhabitants of the village in particular years:

Year	Amount of villagers
1791	88
1845	102
1912	55
1998	38
2002	34
2003	31
2009	31
2011	40
2021	18

== Points of interest ==
- An inanimate natural monument – the erratic boulder "Devil's Stone" measuring 2x2x3 m, the "hero" of numerous legends
- Behind the village there is a former German cemetery
- A Baroque manor house rebuilt in the neo-Gothic style
