= Broniszów Castle =

Coordinates: 51°46′47.9″N 15°29′25.2″E

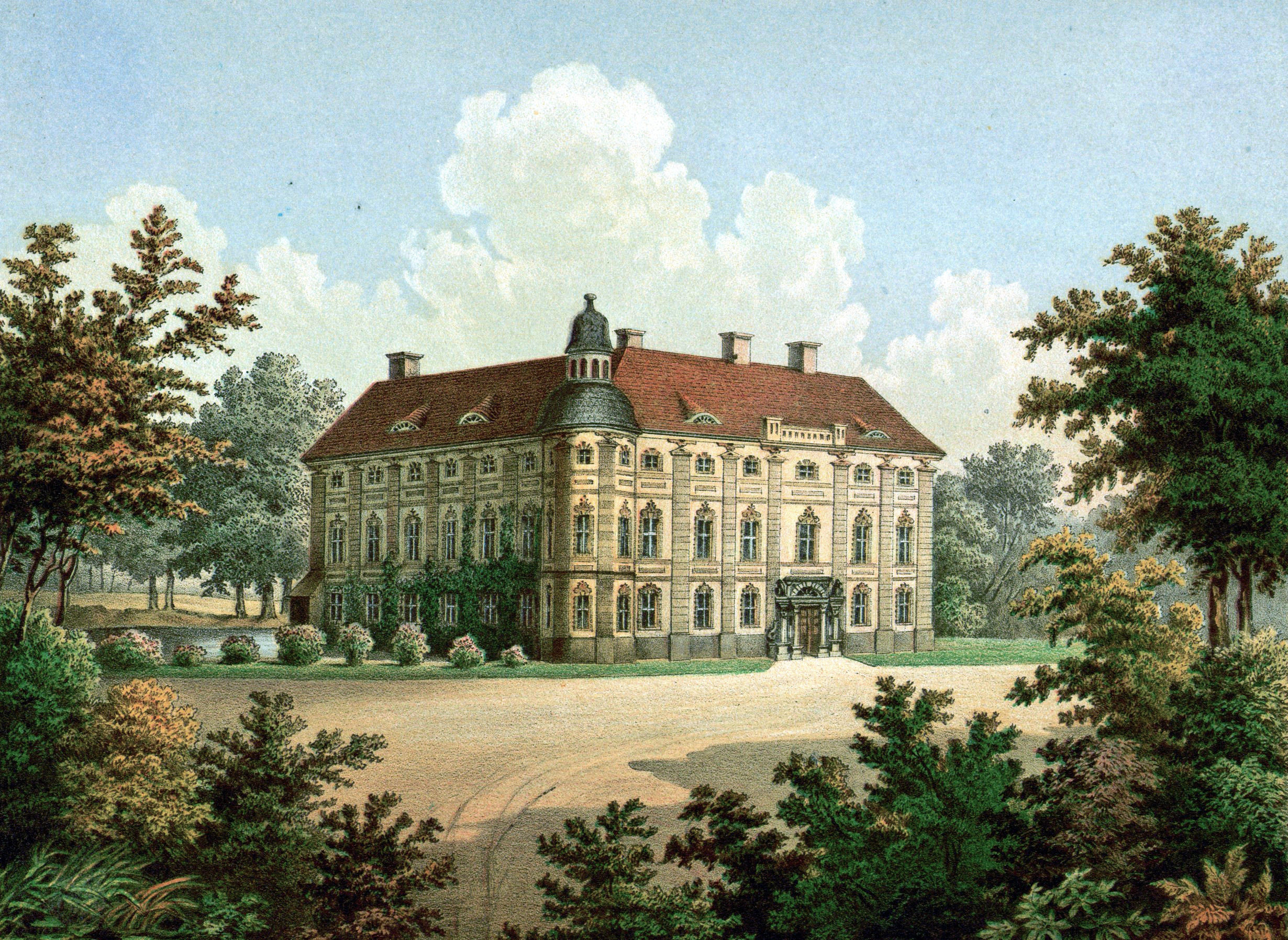
Broniszów Castle around 1860, Alexander Duncker collection.

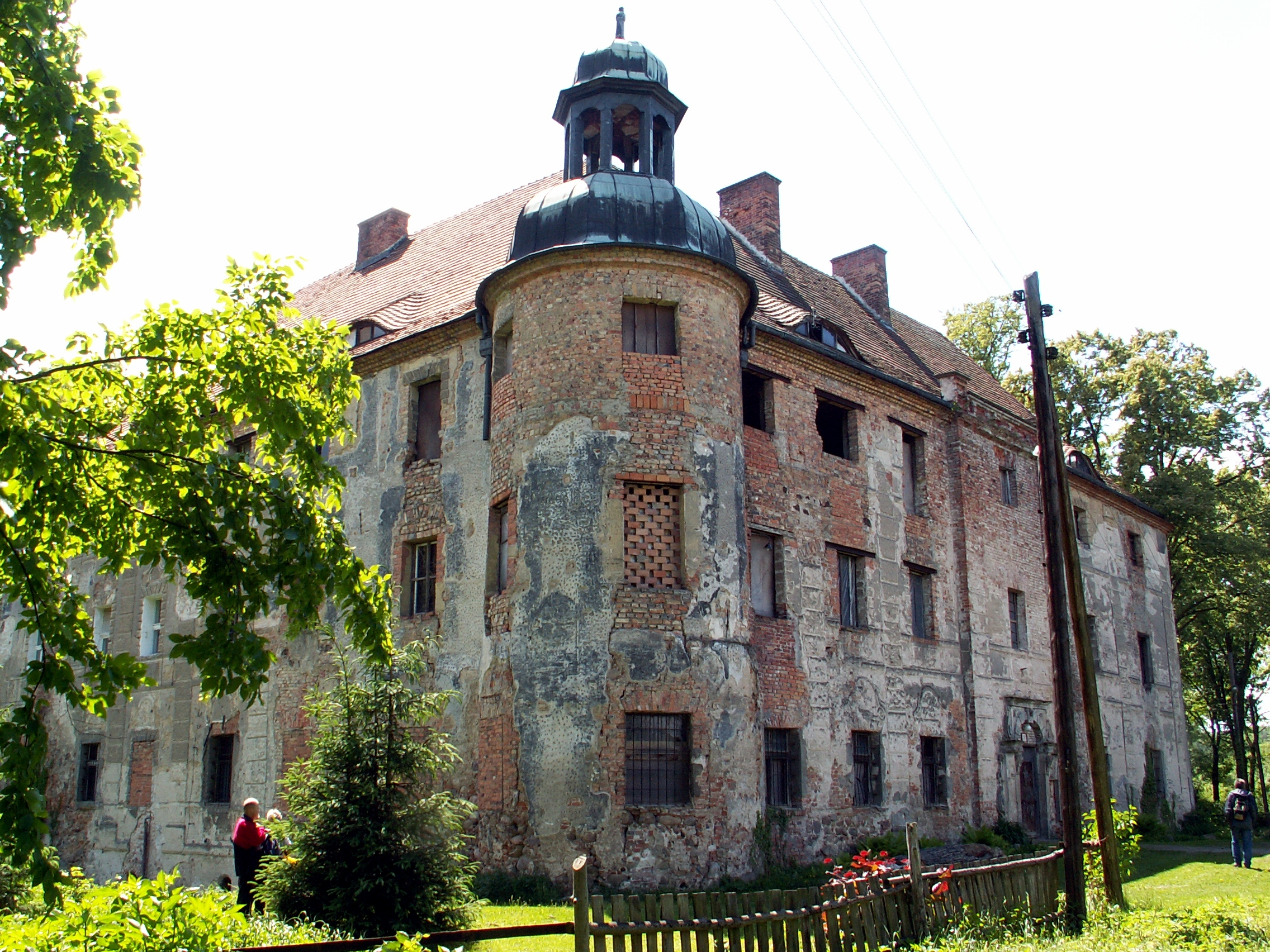
Broniszów Castle

Broniszów Castle (Polish: Zamek w Broniszowie) is a castle in Broniszów, Gmina Kożuchów, within Nowa Sól County, Lubusz Voivodeship, in western Poland.

Originally built in the twelfth century as a knight's castle, in the sixteenth/seventeenth century it was transformed into a court building. The Renaissance three-storey building built of brick and stone with neo-Gothic tower walls closed in the nineteenth century. Since 1986 the castle has held the Broniszów National Photographic Workshops.

== See also ==
- Castles in Poland
