= Słocina =

- Village
- Location within Poland
- Coordinates: 51°46′53″N 15°36′46″E
- Country: Poland
- Voivodeship: Lubusz
- County: Nowa Sól
- Gmina: Kożuchów
- Population: 131

Słocina [swɔˈt͡ɕina] is a village in the administrative district of Gmina Kożuchów, within Nowa Sól County, Lubusz Voivodeship, in western Poland.
