= Zawada, Nowa Sól County =

Zawada
- Village
- Location within Poland
- Coordinates: 51°42′31″N 15°39′37″E
- Country: Poland
- Voivodeship: Lubusz
- County: Nowa Sól
- Gmina: Kożuchów
- Population: 28

Zawada [zaˈvada] is a village in the administrative district of Gmina Kożuchów, within Nowa Sól County, Lubusz Voivodeship, in western Poland.
