= Solniki, Lubusz Voivodeship =

Solniki
- Village
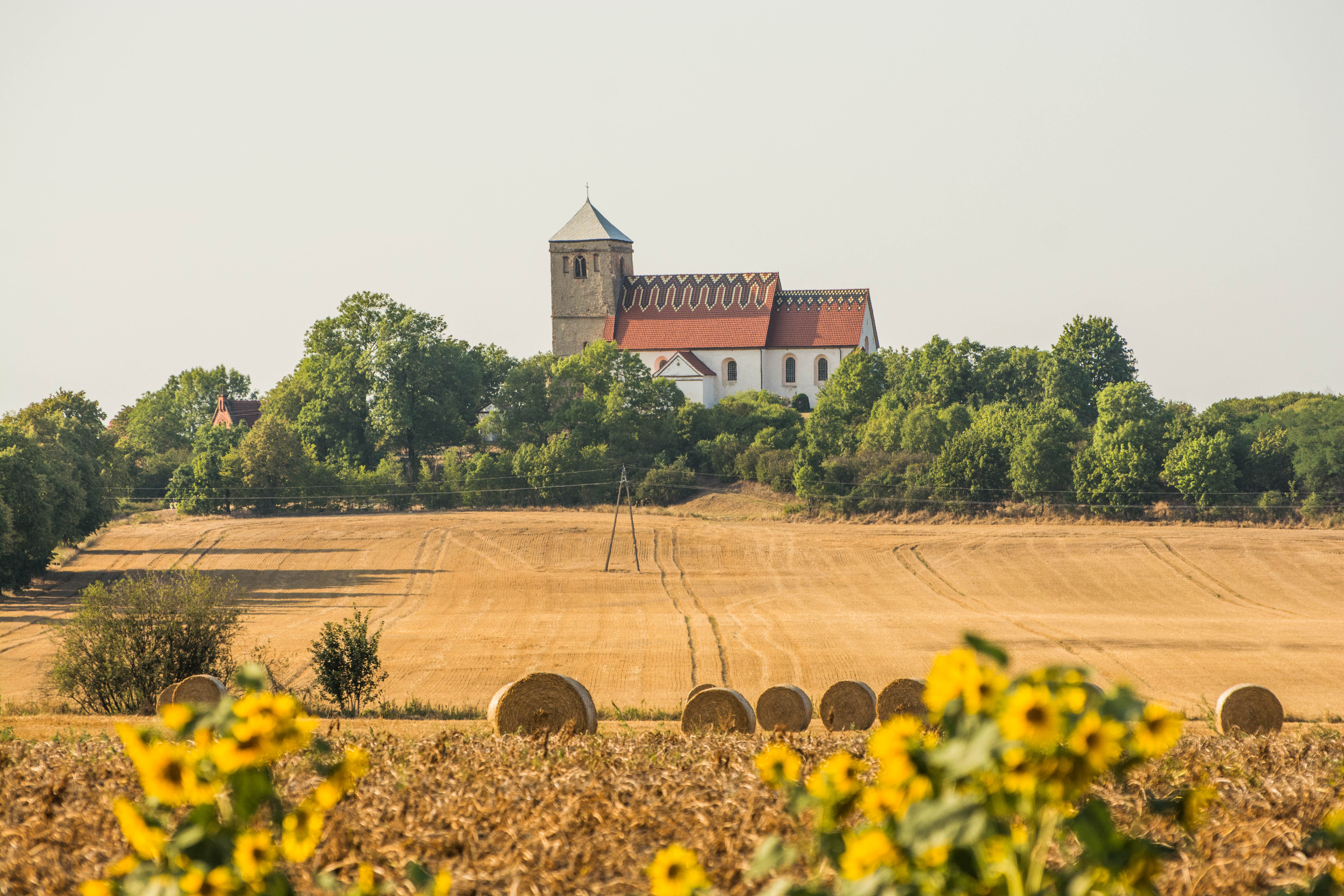
- Catholic church

- Location within Poland
- Coordinates: 51°43′8″N 15°38′56″E
- Country: Poland
- Voivodeship: Lubusz
- County: Nowa Sól
- Gmina: Kożuchów
- Population: 257

Solniki [sɔlˈniki] is a village in the administrative district of Gmina Kożuchów, within Nowa Sól County, Lubusz Voivodeship, in western Poland.
