= Mirocin Średni =

- Village
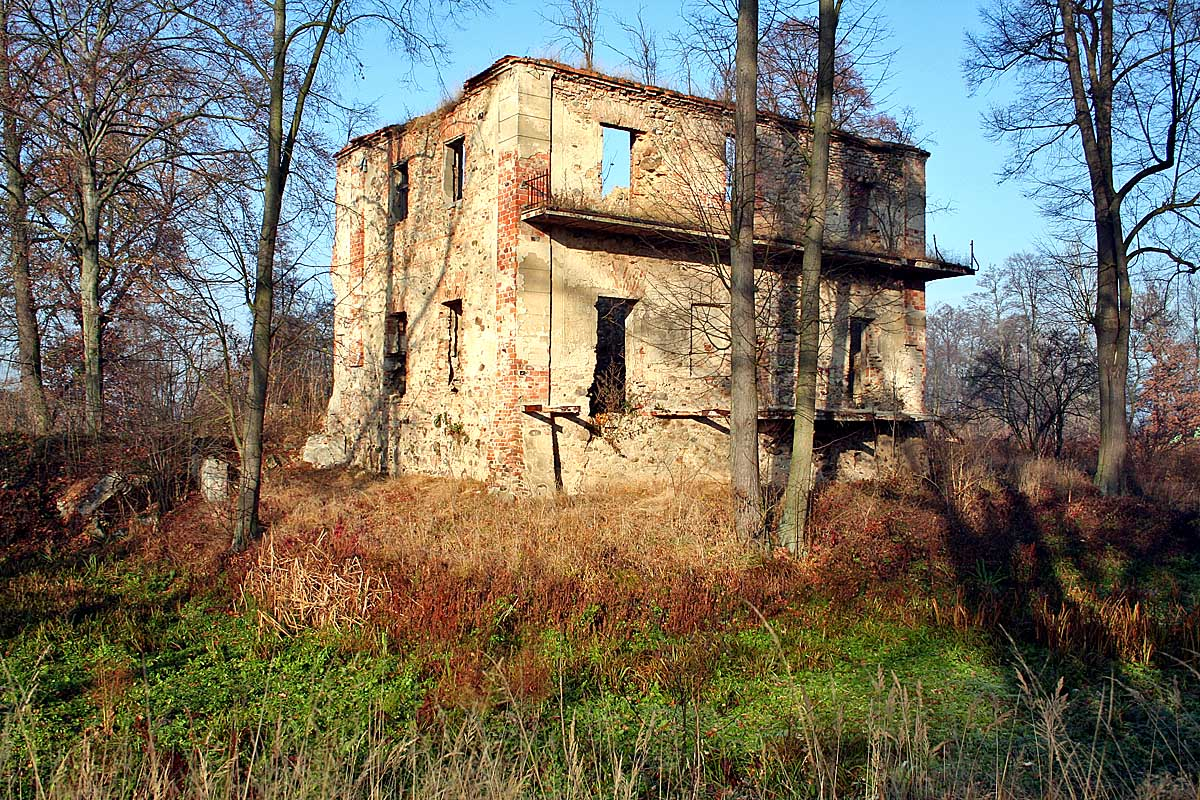
- Dilapidated manor from the 16th century

- Location within Poland
- Coordinates: 51°46′N 15°32′E
- Country: Poland
- Voivodeship: Lubusz
- County: Nowa Sól
- Gmina: Kożuchów
- Population: 257

Mirocin Średni (Polish pronunciation: [miˈrɔtɕin ˈɕrɛdɲi]) is a village in the administrative district of Gmina Kożuchów, within Nowa Sól County, Lubusz Voivodeship, in western Poland.
