= Lasocin, Lubusz Voivodeship =

Lasocin
- Village
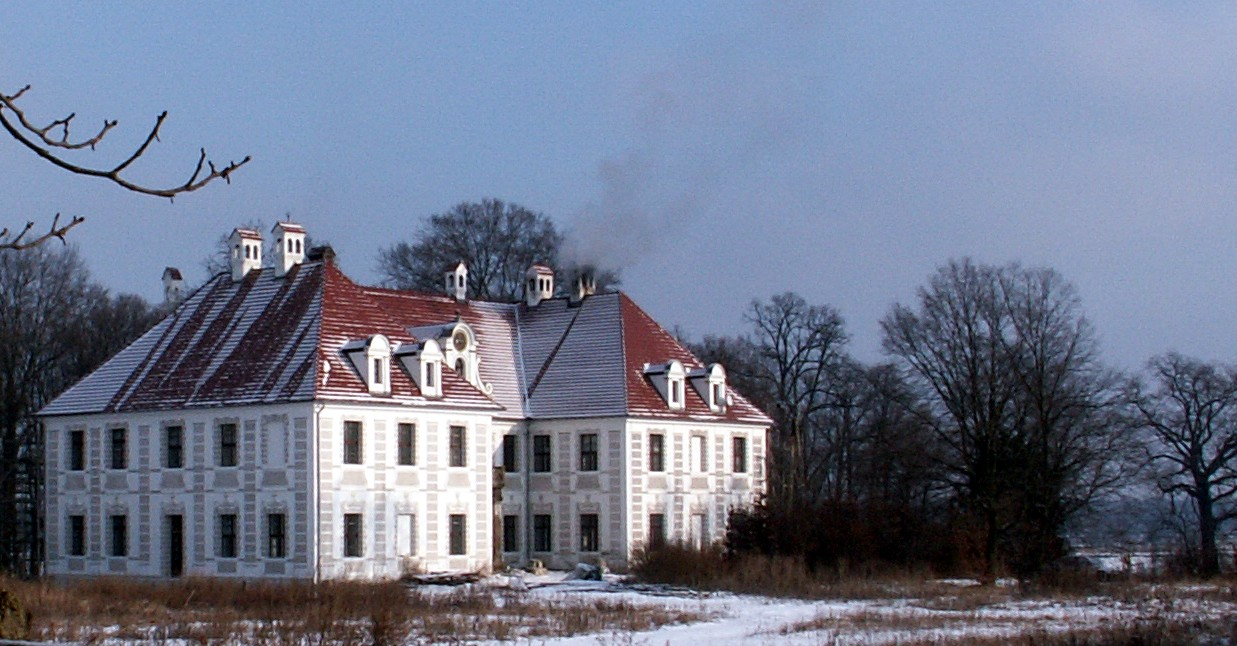
- Palace

- Location within Poland
- Coordinates: 51°43′49″N 15°41′14″E
- Country: Poland
- Voivodeship: Lubusz
- County: Nowa Sól
- Gmina: Kożuchów
- Population: 192

Lasocin [laˈsɔt͡ɕin] is a village in the administrative district of Gmina Kożuchów, within Nowa Sól County, Lubusz Voivodeship, in western Poland.
