= Czciradz =

- Village
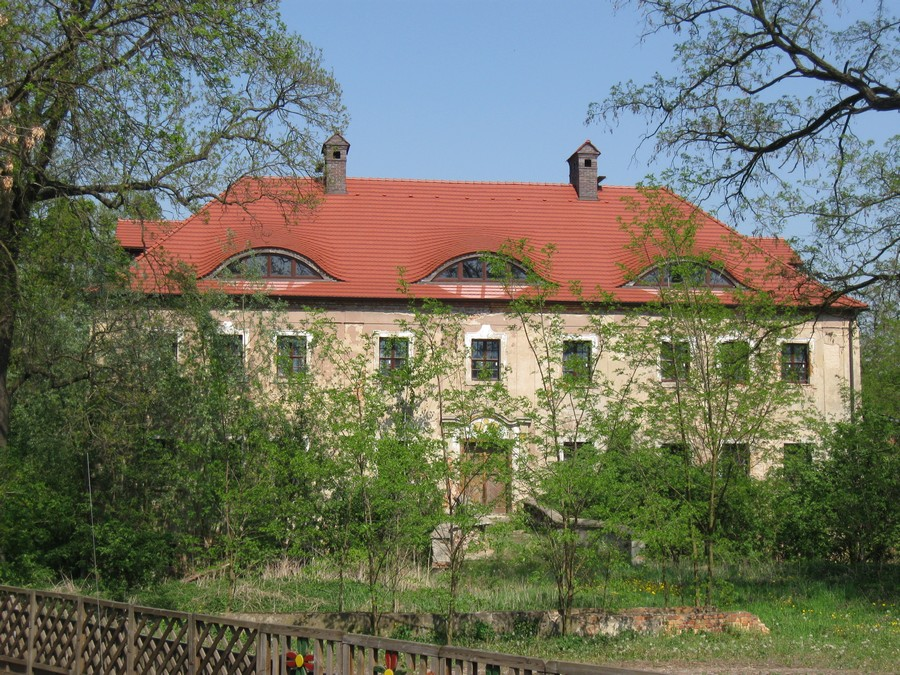
- Palace in Czciradz

- Location within Poland
- Coordinates: 51°44′N 15°38′E
- Country: Poland
- Voivodeship: Lubusz
- County: Nowa Sól
- Gmina: Kożuchów

Population
  - Total: 519

Czciradz [ˈt͡ʂt͡ɕirat͡s] is a village in the administrative district of Gmina Kożuchów, within Nowa Sól County, Lubusz Voivodeship, in western Poland.
