= Sokołów, Lubusz Voivodeship =

Sokołów
- Village
- Location within Poland
- Coordinates: 51°44′47″N 15°39′17″E
- Country: Poland
- Voivodeship: Lubusz
- County: Nowa Sól
- Gmina: Kożuchów
- Population: 154

Sokołów [sɔˈkɔwuf] is a village in the administrative district of Gmina Kożuchów, within Nowa Sól County, Lubusz Voivodeship, in western Poland.
