= Broniszów, Lubusz Voivodeship =

Broniszów
- Village
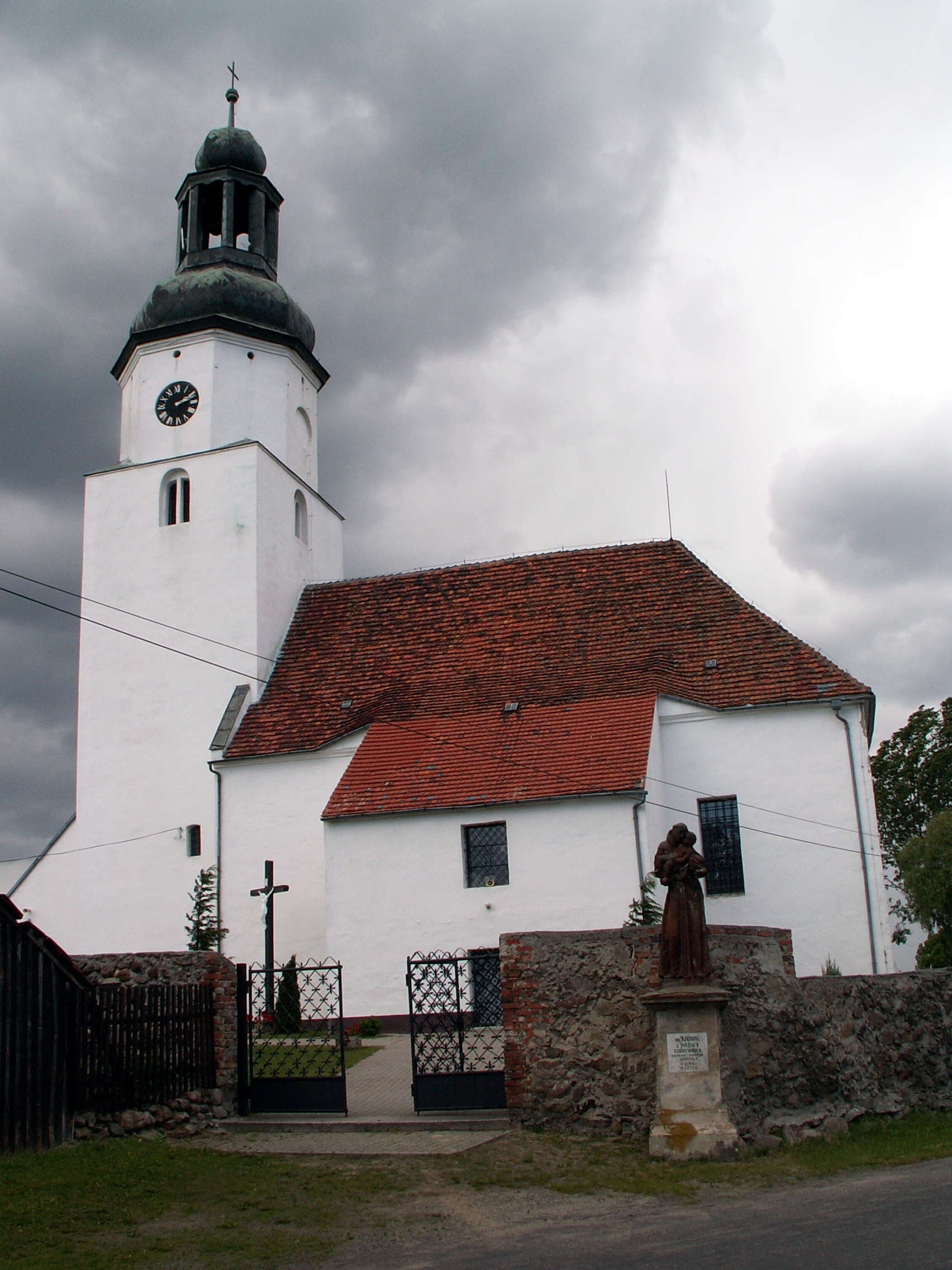
- Saint Anne Church

- Location within Poland
- Coordinates: 51°47′N 15°29′E
- Country: Poland
- Voivodeship: Lubusz
- County: Nowa Sól
- Gmina: Kożuchów
- Population: 370

Broniszów [brɔˈniʂuf] is a village in the administrative district of Gmina Kożuchów, within Nowa Sól County, Lubusz Voivodeship, in western Poland.

The village contains Broniszów Castle.
