= Dziadoszyce =

- Village
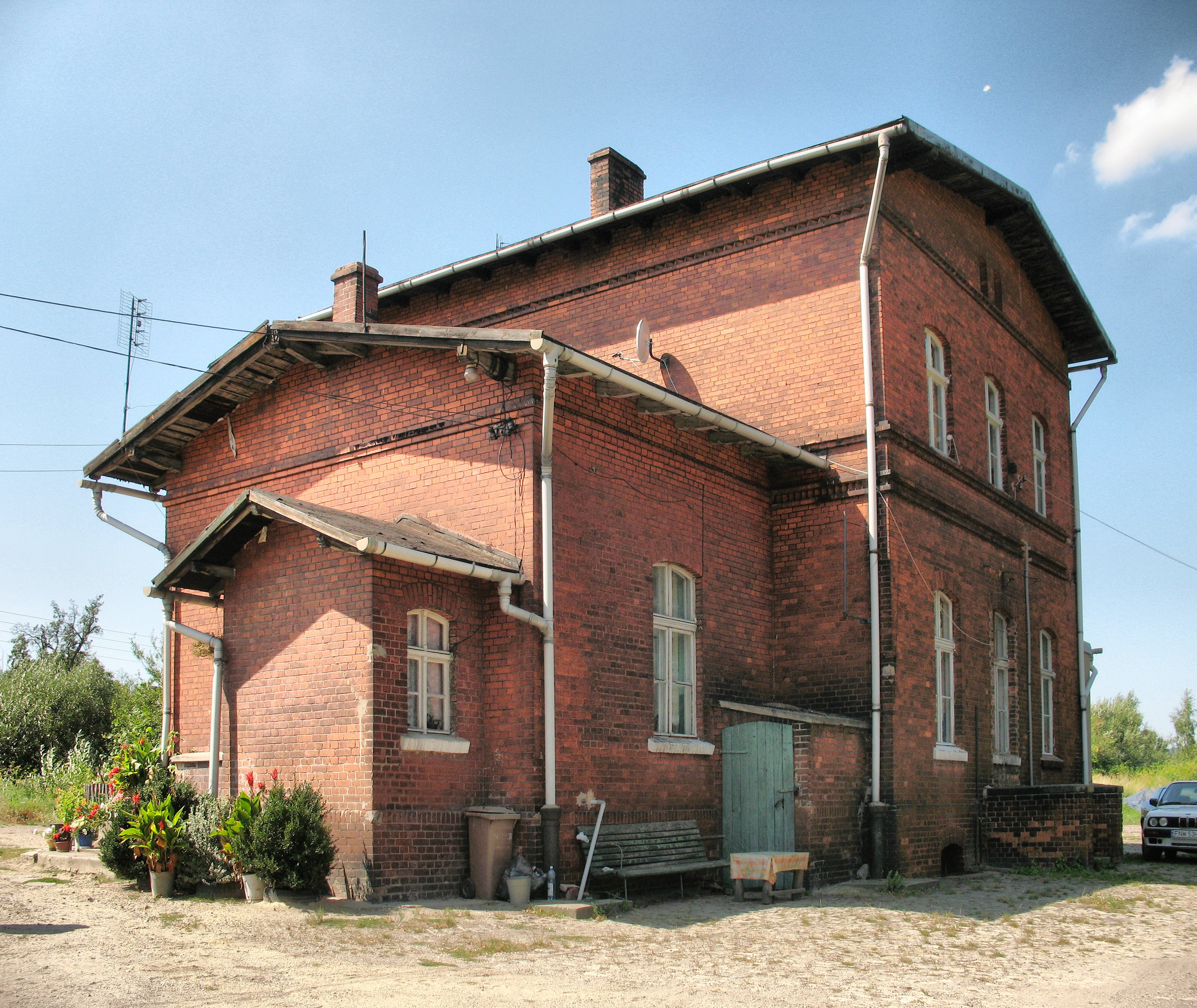
- Former railway station

- Location within Poland
- Coordinates: 51°43′N 15°40′E
- Country: Poland
- Voivodeship: Lubusz
- County: Nowa Sól
- Gmina: Kożuchów
- Population: 47

Dziadoszyce [d͡ʑadɔˈʂɨt͡sɛ] (formerly German Döringau) is a village in the administrative district of Gmina Kożuchów, within Nowa Sól County, Lubusz Voivodeship, in western Poland.

The village has a population of 47.
