= Bielice, Nowa Sól County =

Bielice
- Village
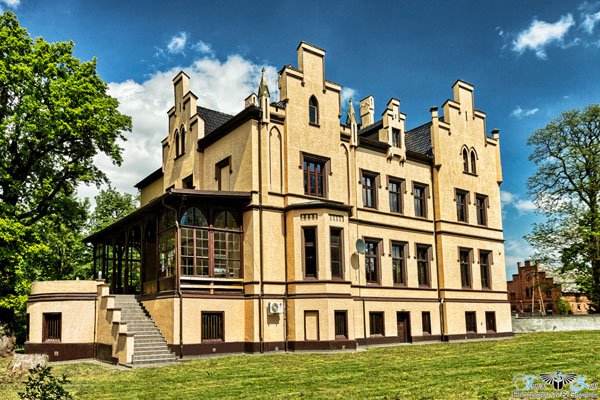
- Palace

- Location within Poland
- Coordinates: 51°43′5″N 15°40′55″E
- Country: Poland
- Voivodeship: Lubusz
- County: Nowa Sól
- Gmina: Kożuchów
- Population: 111

Bielice [bjɛˈlit͡sɛ] is a village in the administrative district of Gmina Kożuchów, within Nowa Sól County, Lubusz Voivodeship, in western Poland.
