= Cisów, Lubusz Voivodeship =

Cisów
- Village
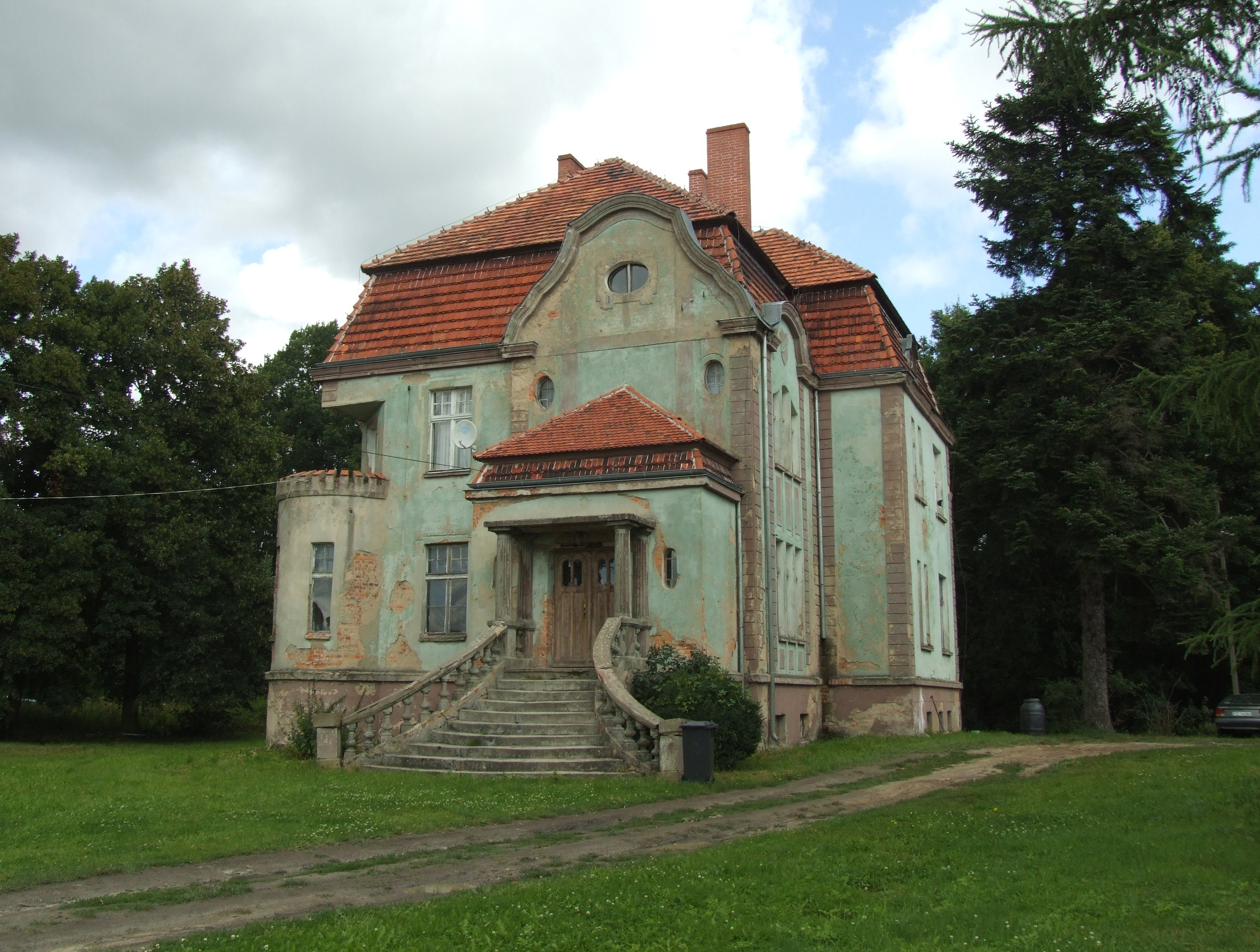
- Villa in Cisów

- Location within Poland
- Coordinates: 51°43′2″N 15°36′40″E
- Country: Poland
- Voivodeship: Lubusz
- County: Nowa Sól
- Gmina: Kożuchów
- Population: 101

Cisów [ˈt͡ɕisuf] (formerly German Zissendorf) is a village in the administrative district of Gmina Kożuchów, within Nowa Sól County, Lubusz Voivodeship, in western Poland. The village used to be an administrative part of Zielona Góra from 1975 to 1988.

The village had a population of 101 as of 2005.
