= Radwanów, Lubusz Voivodeship =

Radwanów
- Village
- Location within Poland
- Coordinates: 51°48′18″N 15°29′32″E
- Country: Poland
- Voivodeship: Lubusz
- County: Nowa Sól
- Gmina: Kożuchów
- Population: 461

Radwanów (Polish: [raˈdvanuf]) is a village in the administrative district of Gmina Kożuchów, within Nowa Sól County, Lubusz Voivodeship, in western Poland.
