= Książ Śląski =

- Village
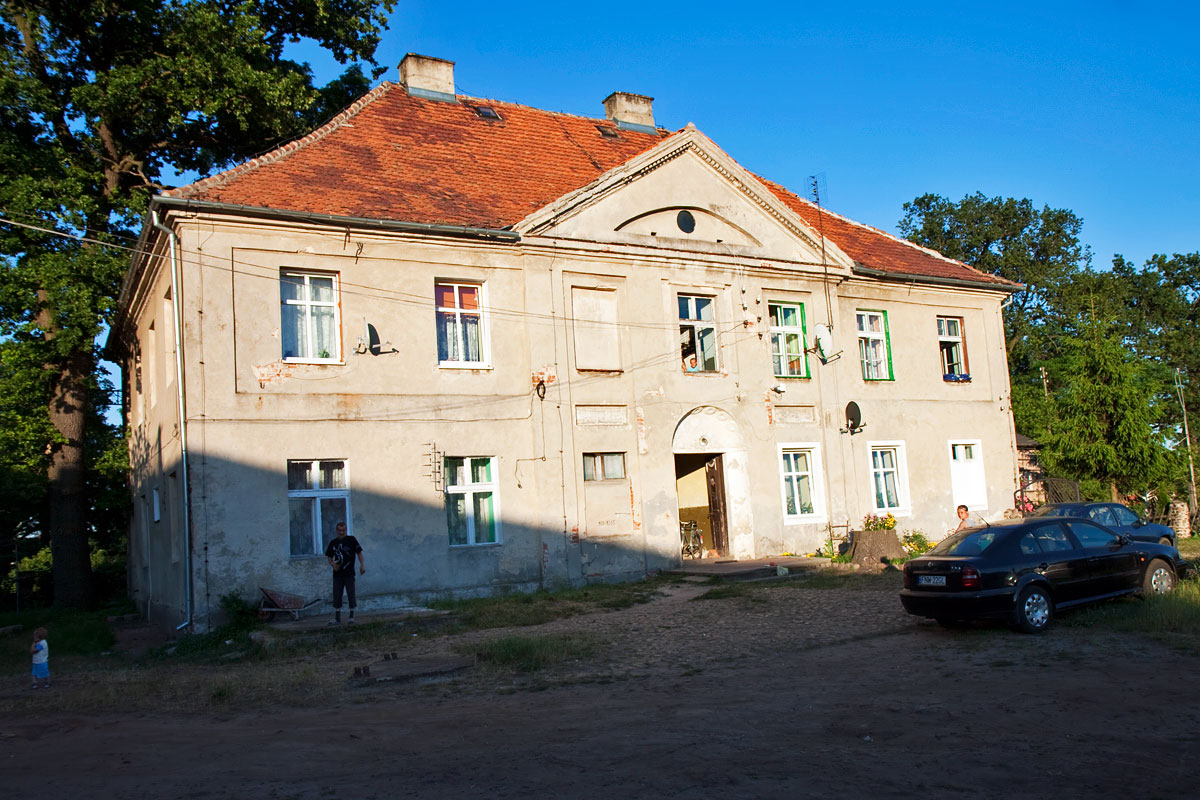
- Manor house in Książ Śląski

- Location within Poland
- Coordinates: 51°49′N 15°33′E
- Country: Poland
- Voivodeship: Lubusz
- County: Nowa Sól
- Gmina: Kożuchów
- Population: 340

Książ Śląski (Polish pronunciation: [ˈkɕɔ̃ʂ ˈɕlɔ̃skʲi]) is a village in the administrative district of Gmina Kożuchów, within Nowa Sól County, Lubusz Voivodeship, in western Poland.
