= Drwalewice, Lubusz Voivodeship =

Drwalewice
- Village
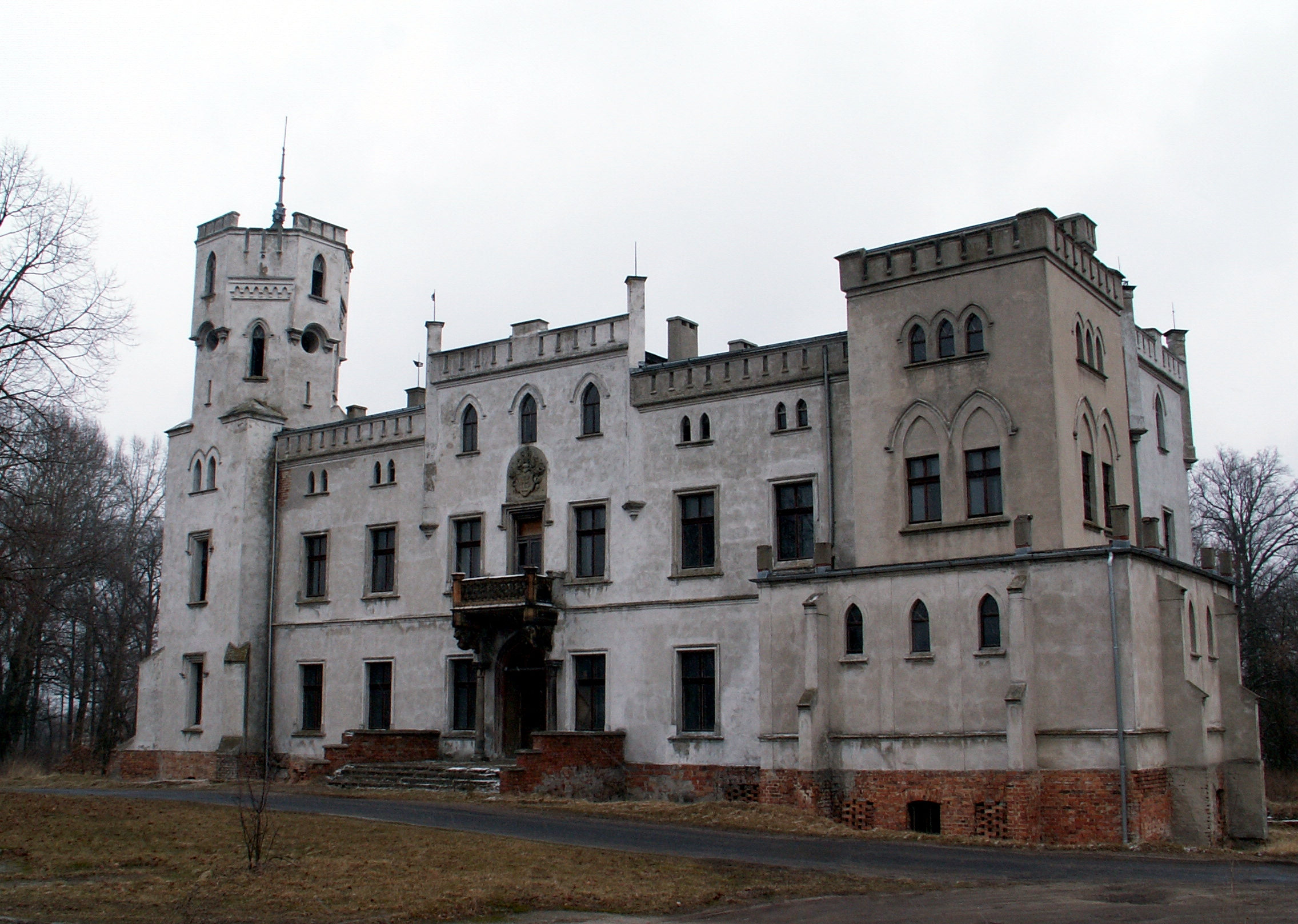
- Palace from the 16th century

- Location within Poland
- Coordinates: 51°44′N 15°40′E
- Country: Poland
- Voivodeship: Lubusz
- County: Nowa Sól
- Gmina: Kożuchów
- Population: 95

Drwalewice [drvalɛˈvit͡sɛ] is a village in the administrative district of Gmina Kożuchów, within Nowa Sól County, Lubusz Voivodeship, in western Poland.

== History ==
In the 14th century Drwalewice belonged to the Unruh family. Hans Wolff von Unruh, the last of the Unruhs to preside over the village, had a renaissance manor-house built in the village in the mid-16th century. The von Braun family later ruled over the town, including Dietrich von Braun, who was murdered by his brother Wolff. According to local legend this was due to a dispute between Dietrich and Wolff von Braun over a girl. In 1875 the manor-house was replaced by the neo-gothic palace that presently stands in the village. After World War II, the former von Braun estate was converted into a state farm and the place was used as a residence.
