= Studzieniec, Lubusz Voivodeship =

Studzieniec
- Village
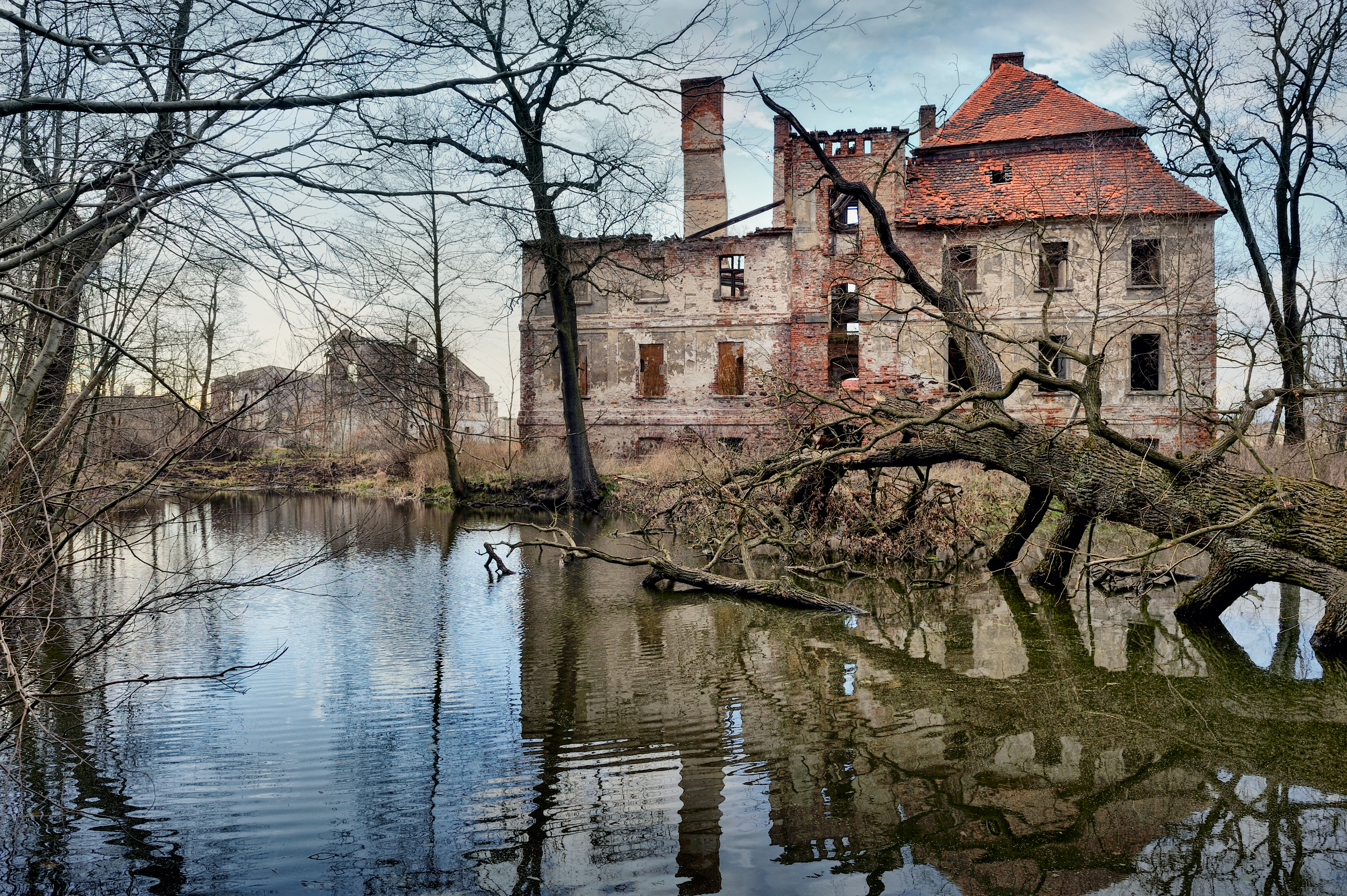
- Palace

- Location within Poland
- Coordinates: 51°48′11″N 15°34′30″E
- Country: Poland
- Voivodeship: Lubusz
- County: Nowa Sól
- Gmina: Kożuchów
- Population: 741

Studzieniec [stuˈd͡ʑɛɲɛt͡s] is a village in the administrative district of Gmina Kożuchów, within Nowa Sól County, Lubusz Voivodeship, in western Poland.
