= Dziwiszowice =

- Village
- Location within Poland
- Coordinates: 51°43′50″N 15°40′14″E
- Country: Poland
- Voivodeship: Lubusz
- County: Nowa Sól
- Gmina: Kożuchów

Dziwiszowice [d͡ʑiviʂɔˈvit͡sɛ] is a village in the administrative district of Gmina Kożuchów, within Nowa Sól County, Lubusz Voivodeship, in western Poland.
