= Wolnica, Lubusz Voivodeship =

Wolnica
- Village
- Location within Poland
- Coordinates: 51°49′33″N 15°31′49″E
- Country: Poland
- Voivodeship: Lubusz
- County: Nowa Sól
- Gmina: Kożuchów
- Population: 0

Wolnica [vɔlˈnit͡sa] was a folwark in the administrative district of Gmina Kożuchów, within Nowa Sól County, Lubusz Voivodeship, in western Poland.
