= Kierzkowice, Lubusz Voivodeship =

Kierzkowice
- Village
- Location within Poland
- Coordinates: 51°42′09″N 15°37′19″E
- Country: Poland
- Voivodeship: Lubusz
- County: Nowa Sól
- Gmina: Kożuchów

Kierzkowice [kʲɛʂkɔˈvit͡sɛ] is a village in the administrative district of Gmina Kożuchów, within Nowa Sól County, Lubusz Voivodeship, in western Poland.
