= Mirocin Dolny =

- Village
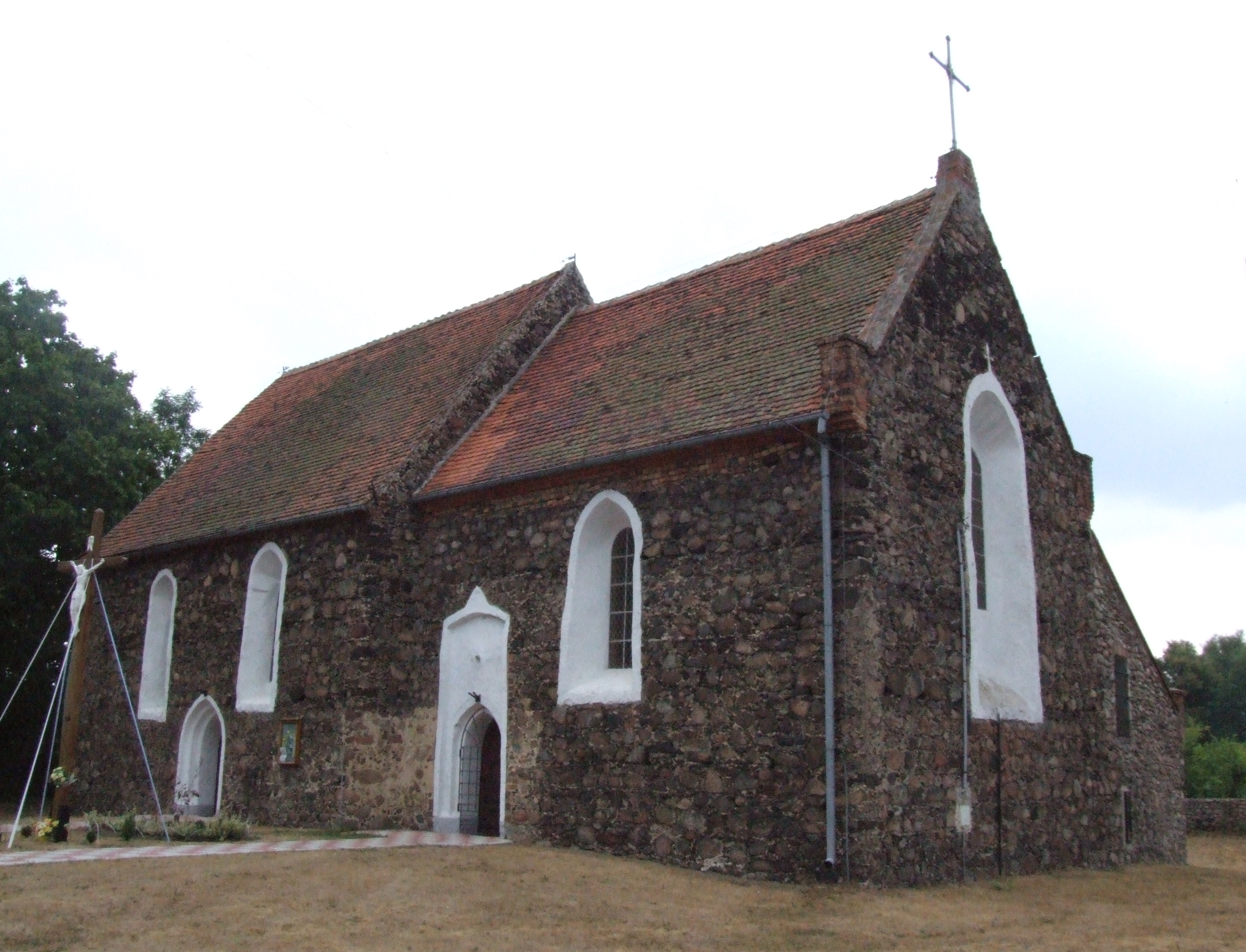
- Medieval church

- Location within Poland
- Coordinates: 51°47′N 15°32′E
- Country: Poland
- Voivodeship: Lubusz
- County: Nowa Sól
- Gmina: Kożuchów
- Population: 378

Mirocin Dolny [miˈrɔt͡ɕin ˈdɔlnɨ] is a village in the administrative district of Gmina Kożuchów, within Nowa Sól County, Lubusz Voivodeship, in western Poland.
