= Stypułów =

- Village
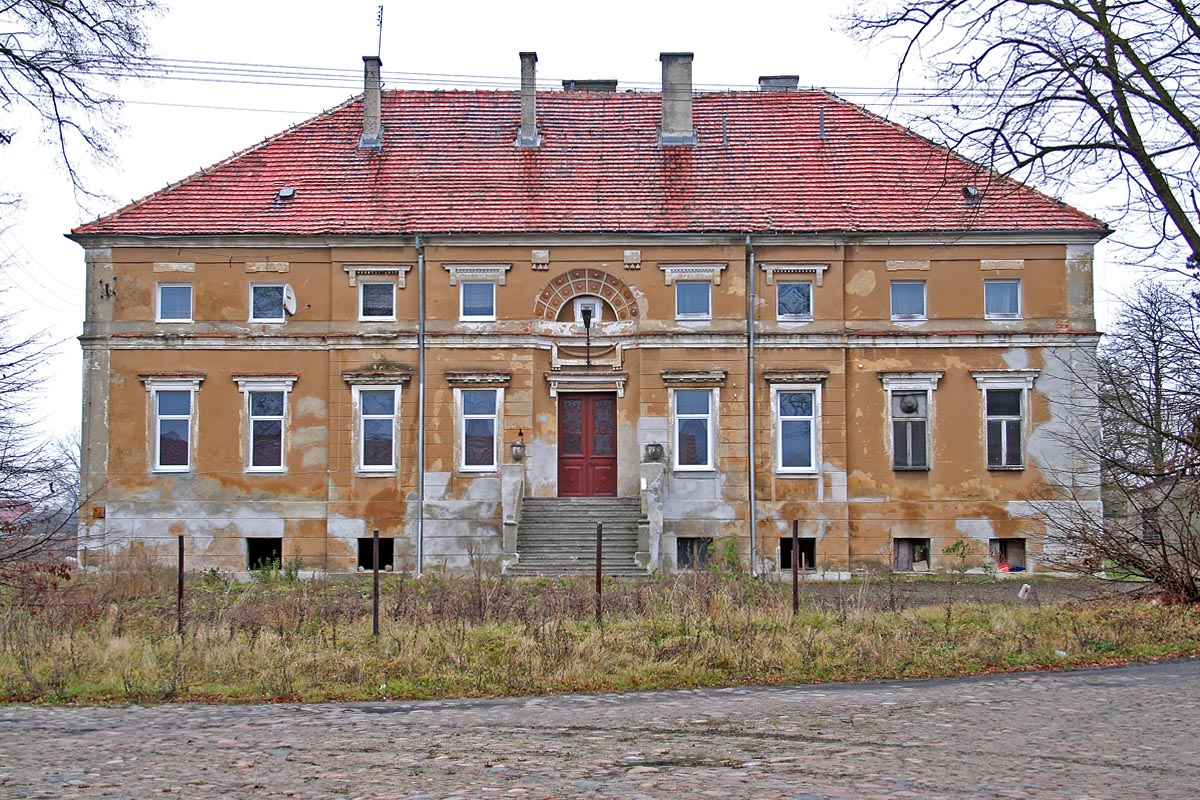
- Manor house

- Location within Poland
- Coordinates: 51°42′N 15°32′E
- Country: Poland
- Voivodeship: Lubusz
- County: Nowa Sól
- Gmina: Kożuchów
- Population: 954

Stypułów [stɨˈpuwuf] is a village in the administrative district of Gmina Kożuchów, within Nowa Sól County, Lubusz Voivodeship, in western Poland.
