= Gmina Kożuchów =

Gmina Kożuchów Kożuchów Commune
- Gmina
- Coat of arms
- Interactive map of Gmina Kożuchów
- Coordinates (Kożuchów): 51°45′N 15°36′E
- Country: Poland
- Voivodeship: Lubusz
- County: Nowa Sól
- Seat: Kożuchów

Area
  - Total: 178.82 km^{2} (69.04 sq mi)

Population (2019-06-30)
  - Total: 15,962
  - Density: 89.263/km^{2} (231.19/sq mi)
  - Urban: 9,432
  - Rural: 6,530
- Website: https://www.kozuchow.pl/

Gmina Kożuchów is an urban-rural gmina (administrative district) in Nowa Sól County, Lubusz Voivodeship, in western Poland. Its seat is the town of Kożuchów, which lies approximately 10 kilometres (6 mi) south-west of Nowa Sól and 23 km (14 mi) south of Zielona Góra.

The gmina covers an area of 178.82 square kilometres (69.0 sq mi), and as of 2019 its total population is 15,962.

== Villages ==
Apart from the town of Kożuchów, Gmina Kożuchów contains the villages and settlements of Bielice, Broniszów, Bulin, Cisów, Czciradz, Drwalewice, Dziadoszyce, Dziwiszowice, Kierzkowice, Książ Śląski, Lasocin, Mirocin Dolny, Mirocin Górny, Mirocin Średni, Podbrzezie Dolne, Podbrzezie Górne, Radwanów, Słocina, Sokołów, Solniki, Studzieniec, Stypułów, Wolnica and Zawada.

== Neighbouring gminas ==
Gmina Kożuchów is bordered by the gminas of Brzeźnica, Nowa Sól, Nowe Miasteczko, Nowogród Bobrzański, Otyń, Szprotawa and Zielona Góra.

== Twin towns – sister cities ==
Gmina Kożuchów is twinned with:

- Schwepnitz, Germany
