= Kożuchów =

Town in Lubusz Voivodeship, Poland

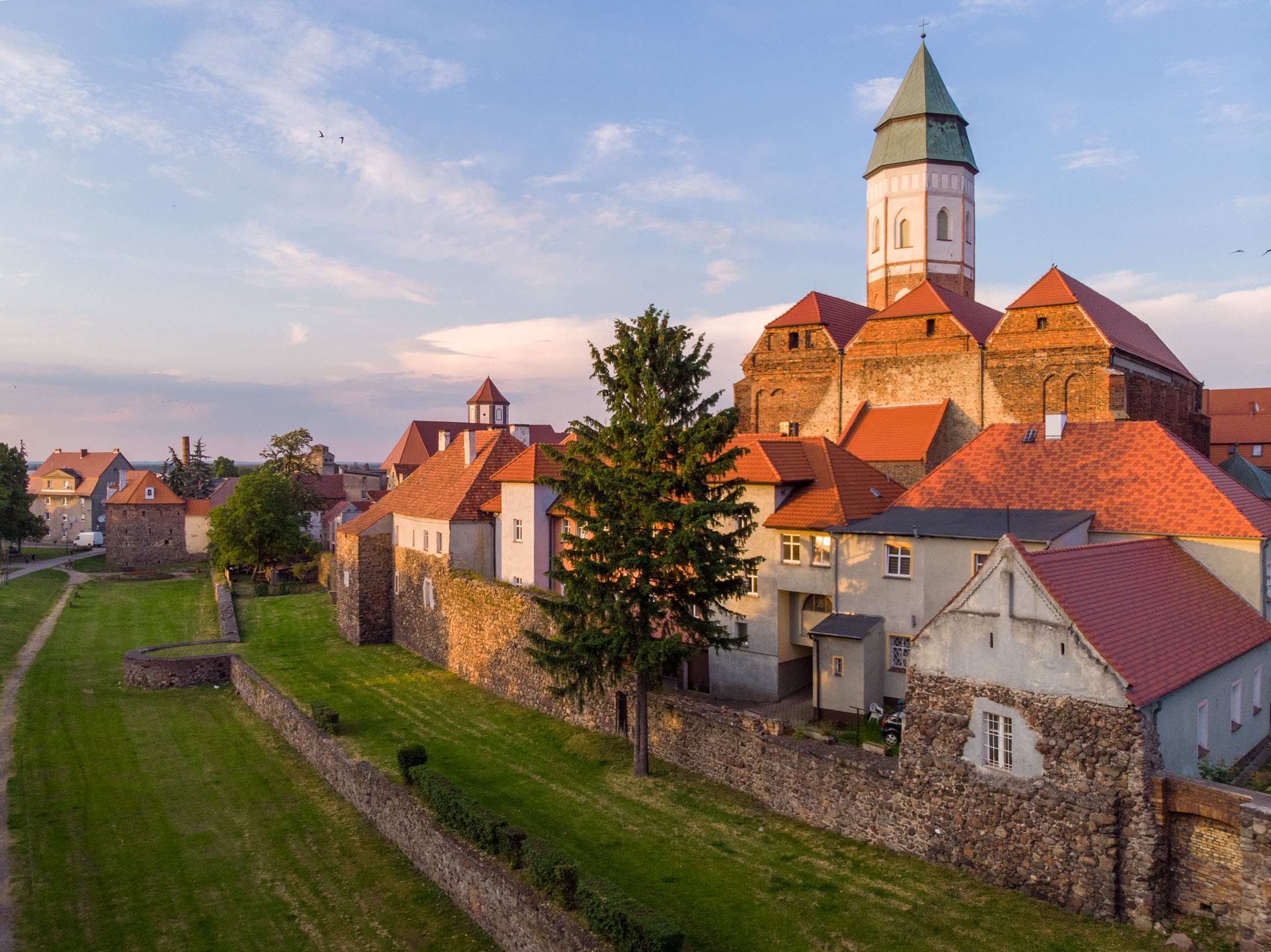
- Kożuchów with its medieval fortifications and the Church of the Purification of Saint Mary

- Flag Coat of arms

- Location within Poland
- Coordinates: 51°45′N 15°36′E
- Country: Poland
- Voivodeship: Lubusz
- County: Nowa Sól
- Gmina: Kożuchów

Government
  - Mayor: Alina Śmigiel

Area
  - Total: 5.95 km^{2} (2.30 sq mi)

Population (2019-06-30)
  - Total: 9,432
  - Density: 1,590/km^{2} (4,110/sq mi)
- Time zone: UTC+1 (CET)
  - Summer (DST): UTC+2 (CEST)
- Postal code: 67-120
- Area code: +48 68
- Vehicle registration: FNW
- Website: http://www.kozuchow.pl

Kożuchów (Polish: [koˈżuhuf]; German: Freystadt in Schlesien) is a town in Nowa Sól County, Lubusz Voivodeship, in western Poland. Founded in the Middle Ages, the town has a preserved medieval urban layout with defensive walls, Gothic churches, and a castle of the Piasts and Jagiellons.

== History ==
The town was founded in the 12th century, when it was part of the Kingdom of Poland. It was granted town rights in 1273 in the process of Ostsiedlung. As a result of the fragmentation of Poland, it became part of the Duchy of Głogów, ruled by the Piasts and Jagiellons until its dissolution in 1506.

While it was a part of Austrian Silesia, the town became highly significant to German literature during the Baroque era. During the Thirty Years War in 1632, war poet Andreas Gryphius witnessed the pillaging and burning of Freystadt by the Protestant army of King Gustavus Adolphus of Sweden. Gryphius immortalized the sack of the city in a detailed account entitled Fewrige Freystadt, which made him many enemies.

In the Silesian Wars of the 18th century the town was annexed by Frederick the Great to the Kingdom of Prussia and, from 1871, was part of the German Empire. Three annual fairs were held in the town in the late 19th century. After the defeat of Nazi Germany in World War II, the town became again part of Poland, although with a Soviet-installed communist regime, which stayed in power until the Fall of Communism in the 1980s. It was renamed to its historic Polish name Kożuchów. The town's German-speaking population was expelled in accordance with the Potsdam Agreement and replaced by an ethnic Polish population similarly expelled from former eastern Poland annexed by the USSR.

== Defensive walls ==
At the turn of the 13th and 14th centuries Kożuchow was surrounded by fieldstone walls. The walls were up to 8 metres high and up to 2 metres thick. The fortifications of Kożuchow are among the best preserved in Poland. The walls and moat have survived for almost the entire medieval length.

== Demographics ==
Historical population

Year	Pop.	±%
1843	3,446	—
1871	3,265	−5.3%
1880	3,993	+22.3%
1890	3,919	−1.9%
1900	4,622	+17.9%
1910	4,765	+3.1%

Year	Pop.	±%
1925	4,976	+4.4%
1939	6,669	+34.0%
1950	3,989	−40.2%
1960	7,419	+86.0%
2010	9,537	+28.5%

== Gallery ==
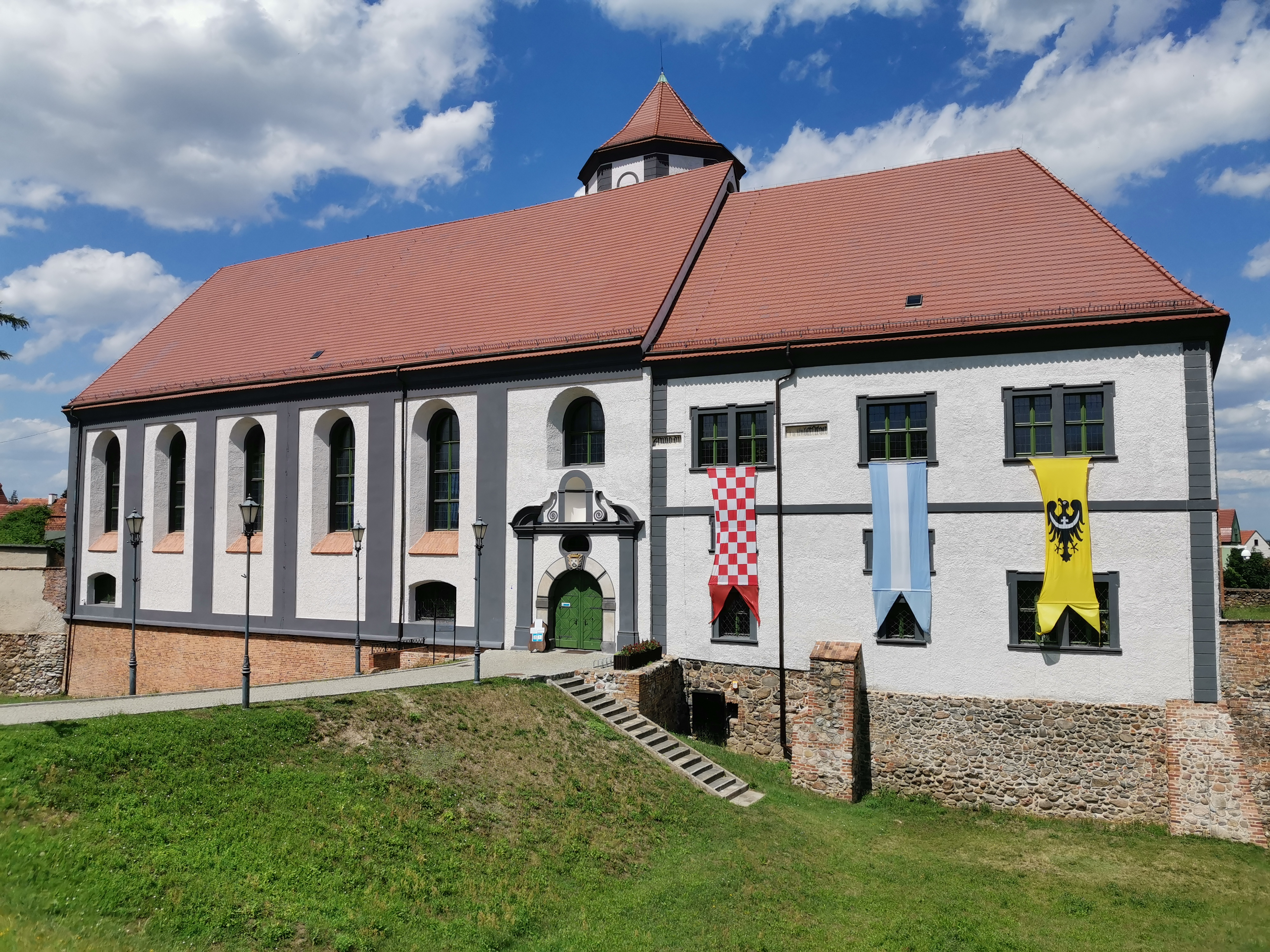
Kożuchów Castle

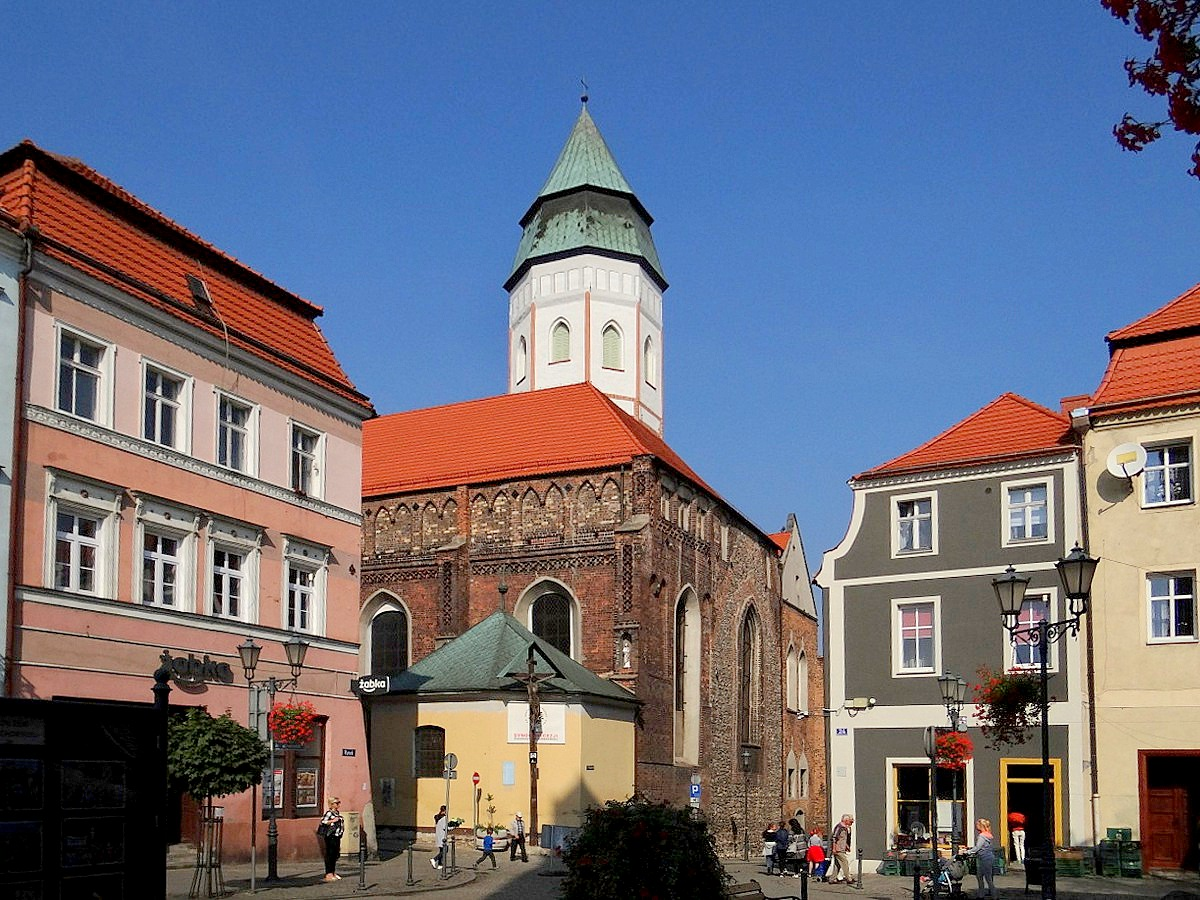
Church of the Purification of Saint Mary

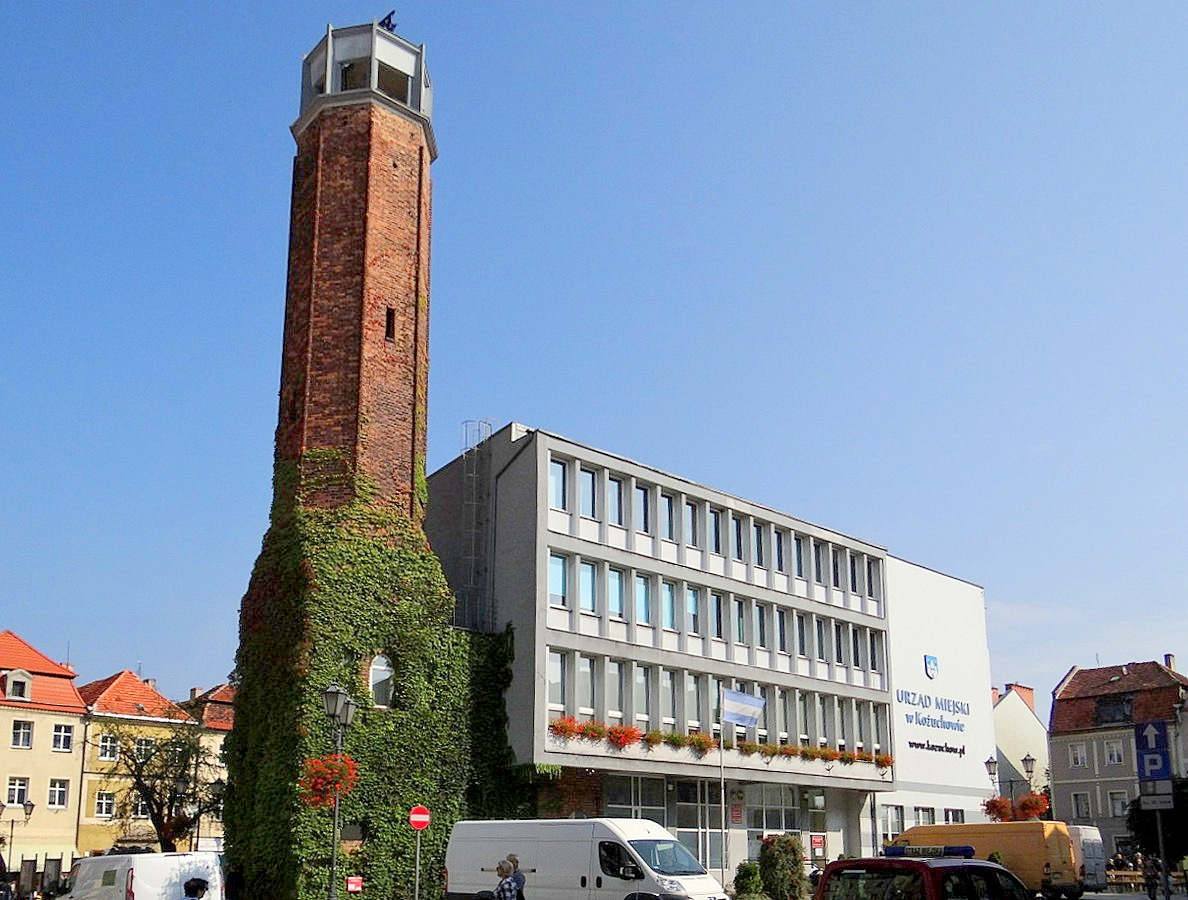
Town hall

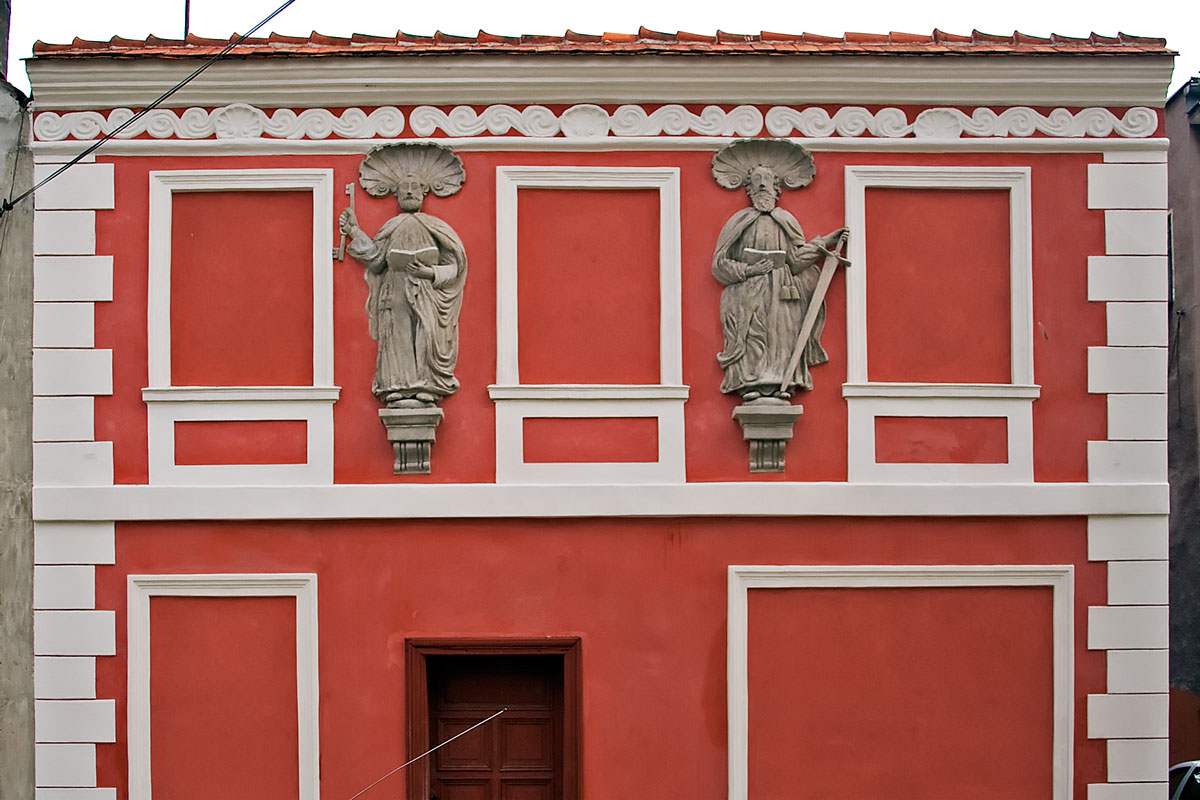
Sculptures of Saints Peter and Paul on the facade of an 18th-century townhouse

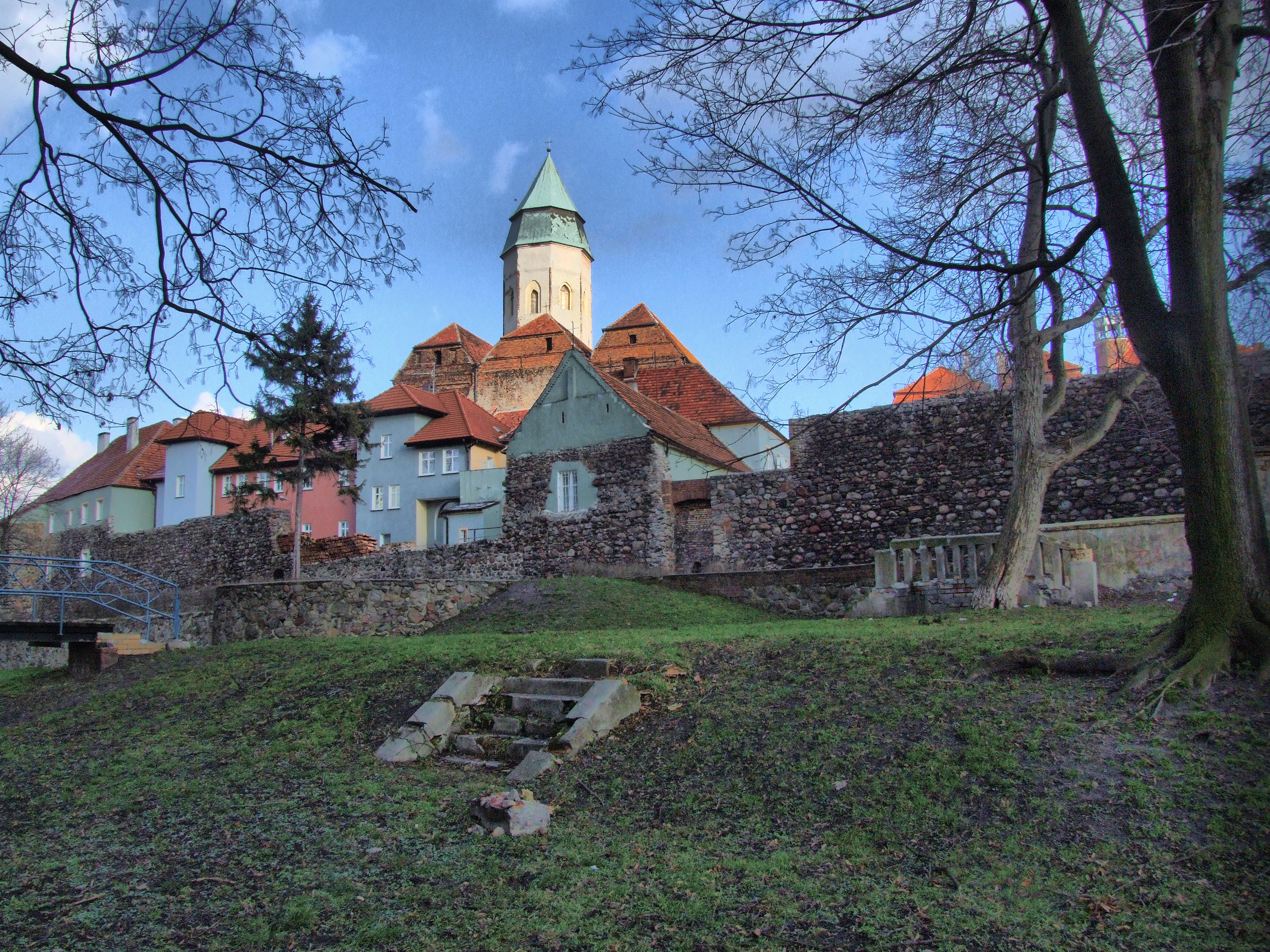
Defensive walls

== Notable people ==
- Andreas Gryphius (1616-1664), important figure in German poetry during and after the Thirty Years War.
- Margarete Kupfer (1881–1953), German actress
- Karl-Ernst Schroeter (1912–1943), U-boat commander
- Paul Tschackert (1848–1911), German Protestant theologian and historian
- Julius von Verdy du Vernois (1832–1910), German general
- Artur Pawlowski (born 1973), Polish-Canadian Protestant street preacher

== Twin towns – sister cities ==
See twin towns of Gmina Kożuchów.
