= LOT Polish Airlines Flight 702 =

1981 aircraft hijacking

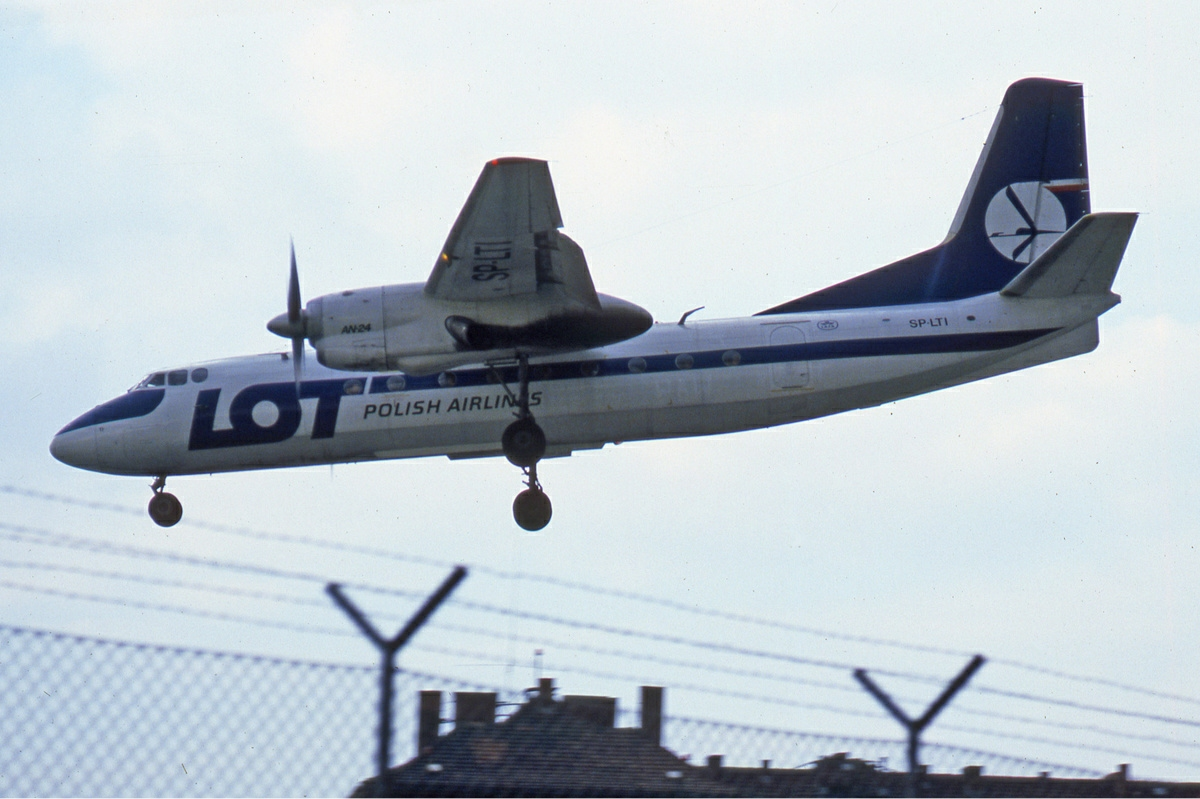
- SP-LTI, landing at Berlin Tempelhof Airport, hijacked in 21 July, 1981, a month before the hijacking of Flight 702

Hijacking
- Date: 22 August 1981
- Summary: Hijacking
- Site: en route

Aircraft
- Aircraft type: Antonov An-24V
- Operator: LOT Polish Airlines
- Registration: SP-LTI
- Flight origin: Wrocław Airport, Wrocław, Polish People's Republic
- Destination: Warsaw Okęcie Airport, Warsaw, Polish People's Republic
- Passengers: 39
- Crew: 4
- Fatalities: 0
- Survivors: 43

The hijacking of LOT Polish Airlines Flight 702 was the hijacking of a scheduled An-24 passenger plane operated by LOT Polish Airlines on 22 August 1981. The hijacker was Jerzy Dygas, the mailman for Tygodnik Solidarność, along with two others, overpowered the crew of a scheduled passenger plane from Wrocław to Warsaw with a grenade and ordered the plane to divert to West Berlin. There were four crew members and 39 passengers on board. The plane landed at Tempelhof Airport at 7:09 p.m., after which the hijacker released the passengers, surrendered to the Americans and requested asylum..

The US authorities handed him over to West Berlin police, who put him on trial for terrorism. Unlike many who escaped the Iron Curtain, Dygas received a sentence higher than the minimum stipulated in the German criminal code and was sentenced to five and a half years in prison.. This was the third hijacking targeting aircraft SP-LTI, following two previous incidents on July 21 and August 5, 1981.

== In popular culture ==
The incident also inspired episode 18 of Telewizja Polska's crime series 07 Come In," titled Bilet do Frankfurtu (English: Air Ticket To Frankfurt), which premiered in 1981. In the episode, Lieutenant Sławomir Borewicz (cast by Bronisław Cieślak) and his team must stop a couple attempting to hijack a plane and flee to Frankfurt, West Germany. The hijacked plane itself (SP-LTI) was also used in the episode.

== See also ==
- Cold War
- LOT Polish Airlines
