= Tadeusz Gronowski =

Polish graphic artist

Gronowski's original design for the LOT Polish Airlines logo, 1929

Tadeusz Lucjan Gronowski (5 October 1894 in Warsaw–20 February 1990 in Warsaw) was a Polish graphic artist, architect who worked as an interior designer, painter, and a book illustrator.

He is considered to be one of the creators of the Polish modern poster. Among his works is the still-used logo of the LOT Polish Airlines, which dates to 1929.

== Biography sketch ==
He graduated from the department of architecture (Polish: Wydział Architektury) at the Warsaw University of Technology, where he studied during 1917-1925, as well as at the École nationale supérieure des Beaux-Arts in Paris, where he also studied painting. During his studies in Warsaw he belonged to the academic society Welecja (Polish: Korporacja Akademicka Welecja). As a graphic artist he worked for such periodicals as Pro arte et studio, Skamander and Życie Literackie. He designed print advertisements for pre-WWII notable companies such as E.Wedel (chocolatier), Orbis Hotels (then a tourist agency) and Herse stores. He is the creator of the still-used logo of LOT Polish Airlines, winning a design contest in 1929. Gronowski took part in preparing the multi-color scheme (Polish: polichromia) on the tenements lining the Warsaw Old Town Square, and also worked in the city's theatres as a set designer.

He was a member of the "Rhythm" Polish Artists' Association (Polish: Stowarzyszenie Artystów Polskich "Rytm"). His work was part of the painting event in the art competition at the 1932 Summer Olympics.

In 1933 he was one of the co-founders of the Commercial Graphic Artists' Circle (Polish: Koło Artystów Grafików Reklamowych). Working at the same time within the Polish Union of Graphic Artists (Polish: Związek Polskich Artystów Grafików), he co-edited the organization's serial Grafika. He spent many of the years between the world wars in Paris, working as interior designer in charge of decor for prestigious and exclusive shops, including Galeries Lafayette.

== Awards ==
He has received many Polish domestic and international prizes and acts of recognition, including the Grand Prix at the Exposition Internationale des Arts Décoratifs et Industriels Modernes in Paris (1925), and the gold medal for his design of Poland's pavilion at the 1939 New York World's Fair. He is considered to be one of the pioneers of the art of the contemporary Polish poster.

== Bibliography ==
- Irena Kossowska, Polish Art Institute at the Polish Academy of Sciences (Polish: Instytut Sztuki Polskiej Akademii Nauk), March 2002. Tadeusz Lucjan Gronowski, a scholarly retrospective biography lodged in the "Art" (Sztuka) section, www.culture.pl (in Polish)
