= Centralwings =

Polish charter airline

IATA	ICAO	Call sign
C0	CLW	CENTRALWINGS
- Founded: 2004
- Ceased operations: 26 March 2009
- Hubs: Warsaw Frederic Chopin Airport; John Paul II International Airport Kraków-Balice
- Fleet size: 12
- Destinations: 56
- Parent company: LOT Polish Airlines
- Headquarters: Warsaw, Poland
- Key people: Jacek Bartminski (CEO)

Centralwings was a charter airline based in Warsaw, Poland. The airline operated as a low-cost airline and then became a charter-only operation in October 2008. It was a subsidiary of LOT Polish Airlines, operating international services in Europe, using Boeing 737 aircraft. Its main base was Warsaw Frederic Chopin Airport, with hubs at Gdańsk Lech Wałęsa Airport and John Paul II International Airport Kraków-Balice. On 26 March 2009 the board of LOT Polish Airlines decided to close Centralwings with no information about what was to happen to its employees.

== History ==
The airline was established in December 2004 and started operations in February 2005. Centralwings, as its name suggests, competed in the Central European market, namely Poland, with a fleet of LOT Boeing 737 aircraft.

Centralwings operated scheduled services from Gdańsk, Katowice, Kraków, Łódź, Poznań, Szczecin, Warsaw and Wrocław. For most of this time around 60% of its capacity was allocated to routes serving Ireland and the UK, where it faced fierce competition from ultra-low-cost competitors such as Ryanair and Wizz Air. However, it also operated flights to a range of Mediterranean beach and island destinations as well as cities such as Amsterdam, Bologna, Lille, Lisbon, Paris Beauvais and Rome. Its schedule of just under 30 routes ceased in October 2008.

On 26 March 2009 Centralwings ceased some of its operations. The decision was made by LOT Polish Airlines because the airline was unprofitable. Centralwings continued to operate until the end of 2009.

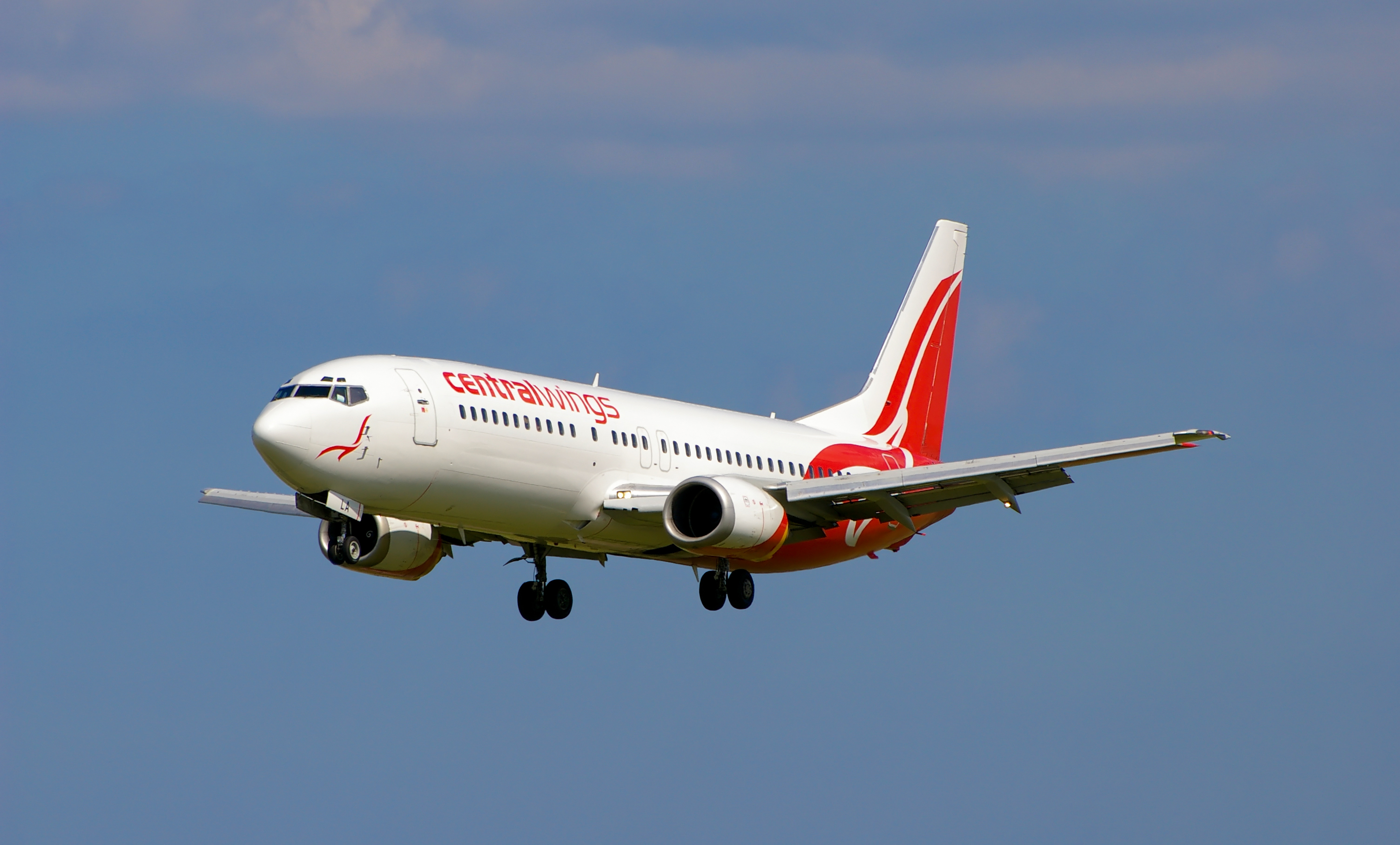
Centralwings Boeing 737-400

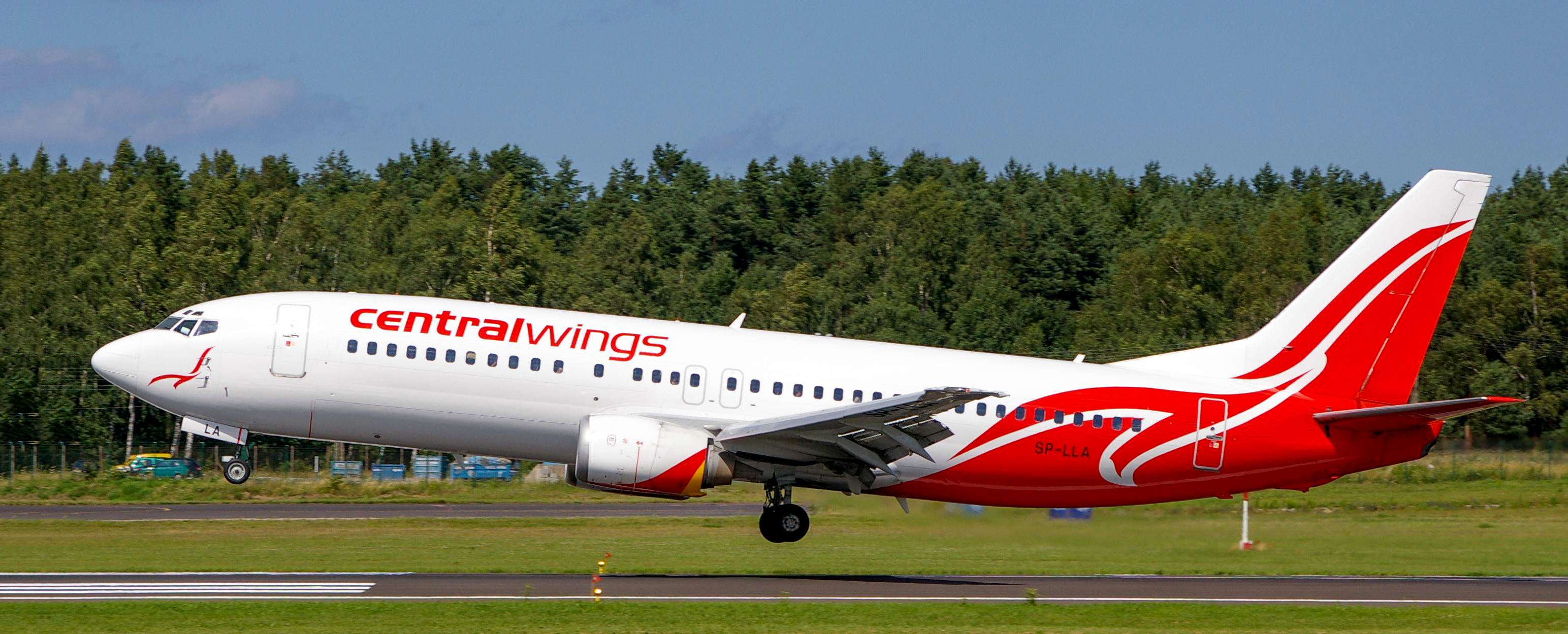
Centralwings Boeing 737-400

== Fleet ==
The Centralwings fleet consisted of the following aircraft (as of 11 September 2008):

- 3 Boeing 737-300
- 8 Boeing 737-400
- 1 McDonnell Douglas MD-80 (leased from MAP Executive Flight Service)
