= LOT Charters =

Polish charter airline

IATA	ICAO	Call sign
-	CLW	CENTRAL WINGS
- Commenced operations: 2009; 16 years ago
- Operating bases: Warsaw Chopin Airport
- Parent company: LOT Polish Airlines
- Headquarters: Warsaw, Poland
- Website: lot.com

LOT Charters is a subsidiary of LOT Polish Airlines, offering charter flights on behalf of tour operators under a separate Air Operator's Certificate using LOT's aircraft.

== History ==
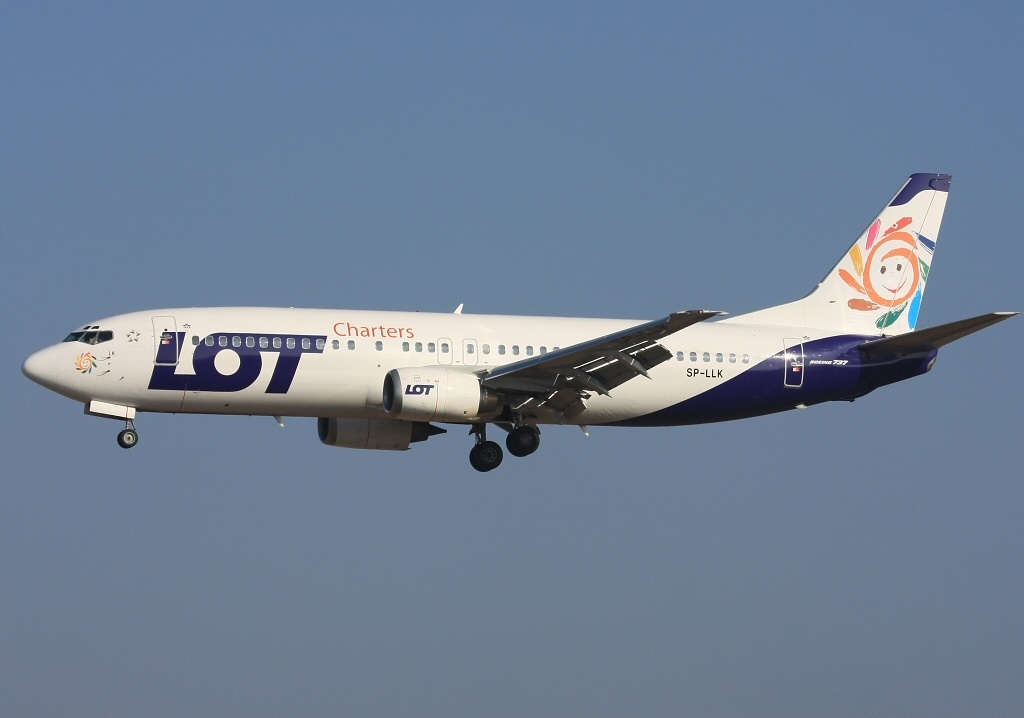
A since retired LOT Charters Boeing 737-400 in 2010.

LOT Charters launched flight operations on 1 June 2009. The airline expected 400,000 annual passengers on its short and long haul flights (the latter ones being operated using the Boeing 767-300ER aircraft of mainline LOT), which would allow it to reach a 25 percent market share and establish a leading position among charter carriers operating on the Polish market. Charter contracts have been signed with Neckermann, TUI, and Rainbow Tours amongst others.

LOT Charters was scheduled to close its operations in October 2013, as LOT removed all of its Boeing 737-400s used by LOT Charters out of its fleet. This is part of the fleet restructuring program to renew LOT's fleet with newer aircraft, replacing the twenty-year-old Boeing 737 and 767s. However, LOT Charters hasn't been closed and is currently offering charter operations using other aircraft of the mainline LOT fleet, including the Boeing 787-8.

== Fleet ==
As of December 2021, LOT Charters does not have any aircraft of its own. Instead, it uses aircraft belong to its parent company, LOT.
