= LOT Polish Airlines =

Flag carrier airline of Poland

LOT Polish Airlines Polskie Linie Lotnicze LOT S.A.

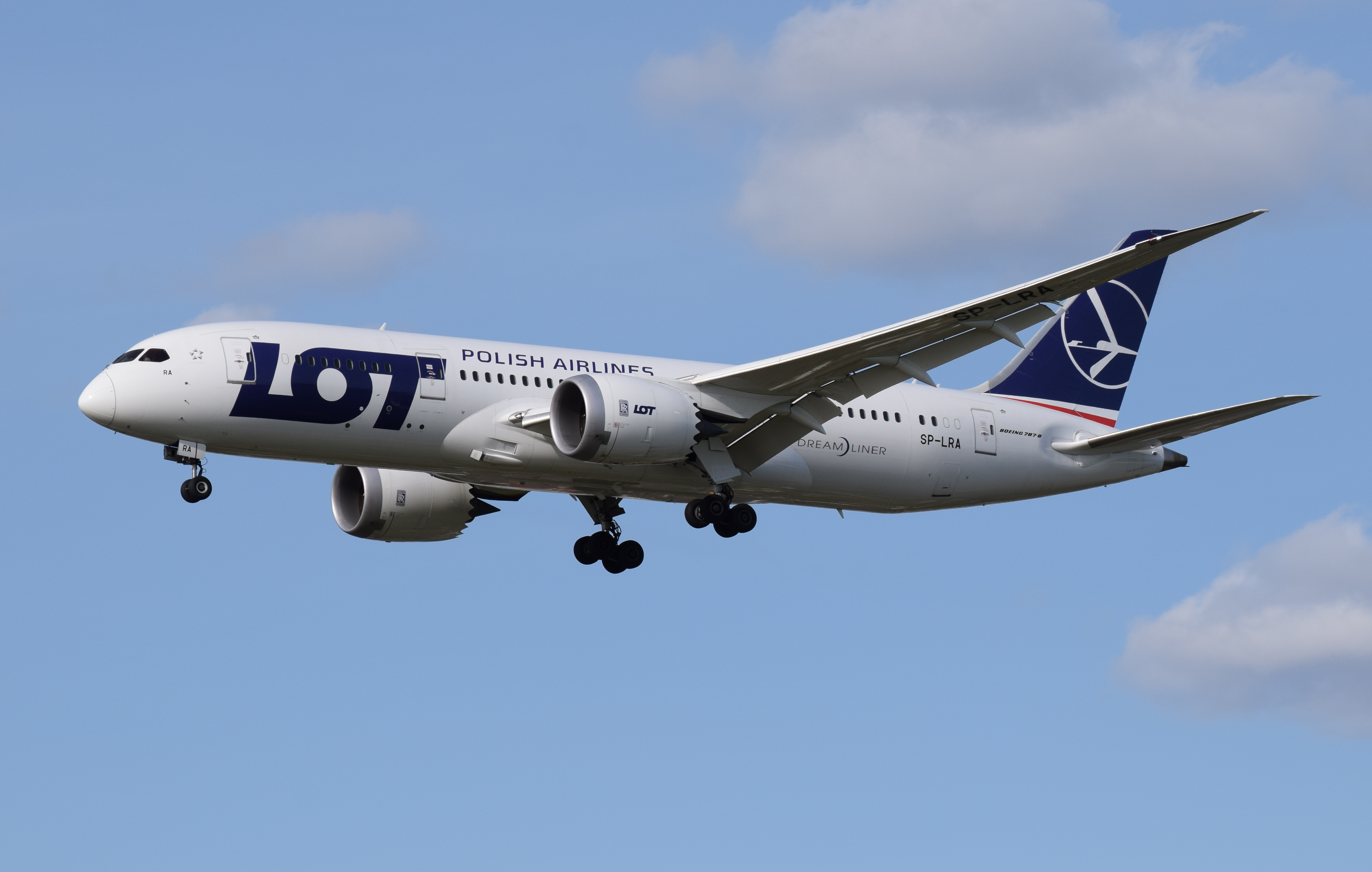
- A LOT Polish Airlines Boeing 787-8
IATA	ICAO	Call sign
LO	LOT	LOT
- Founded: 29 December 1928; 97 years ago
- Commenced operations: 1 January 1929; 97 years ago
- Hubs: Warsaw–Chopin
- Secondary hubs: Kraków
- Focus cities: Gdańsk; Wrocław
- Frequent-flyer program: Miles & More
- Alliance: Star Alliance
- Subsidiaries: LOT Charters; LOT Cargo
- Fleet size: 96
- Destinations: 102
- Parent company: State-owned enterprise (69.3%); Polish Aviation Group (30.7%)
- Headquarters: Warsaw, Poland
- Key people: Michał Fijoł (president of the management board)
- Revenue: ▲PLN 10.22 billion (2025)
- Operating income: ▲PLN 422 million (2025)
- Net income: ▲PLN 350 million (2025)
- Total equity: ▲US$286.985 million (2024)
- Employees: 10,700 (2024)
- Website: www.lot.com

LOT Polish Airlines, legally Polskie Linie Lotnicze LOT S.A. (Polish pronunciation: [lɔt], flight), is the flag carrier airline of Poland. A founding member of IATA, it is one of the world's oldest airlines still in operation. With a fleet of 96 aircraft as of July 2026, LOT is Europe's 22nd largest operator by the total number of passengers scheduled, serving 102 destinations across Europe, Asia, Africa and North America. The airline was founded on 29 December 1928 by the Polish government during the Second Polish Republic as a self-governing limited liability corporation, taking over existing domestic airlines Aerolot (founded in 1922) and Aero (founded in 1925). LOT officially commenced operations on 1 January 1929.

In the 1930s, LOT rapidly expanded its network and modernized its fleet, moving to the new Warsaw Okęcie Airport in 1934. The outbreak of World War II forced the suspension of operations, but the airline was reestablished in 1945 as a state enterprise. Reflecting Poland's status as a communist state, the post-war fleet relied exclusively on Soviet-built aircraft. During this era, LOT rebuilt its European and Middle Eastern routes, eventually launching transatlantic flights in the early 1970s.

In the post-1989 era, LOT transitioned to Western aircraft. The airline joined Star Alliance in 2003, and in 2012, it became the first European operator of the Boeing 787 Dreamliner. Most of LOT's destinations originate from its hub at Warsaw Chopin Airport.

== History ==
=== Pre-war LOT of the Second Republic ===
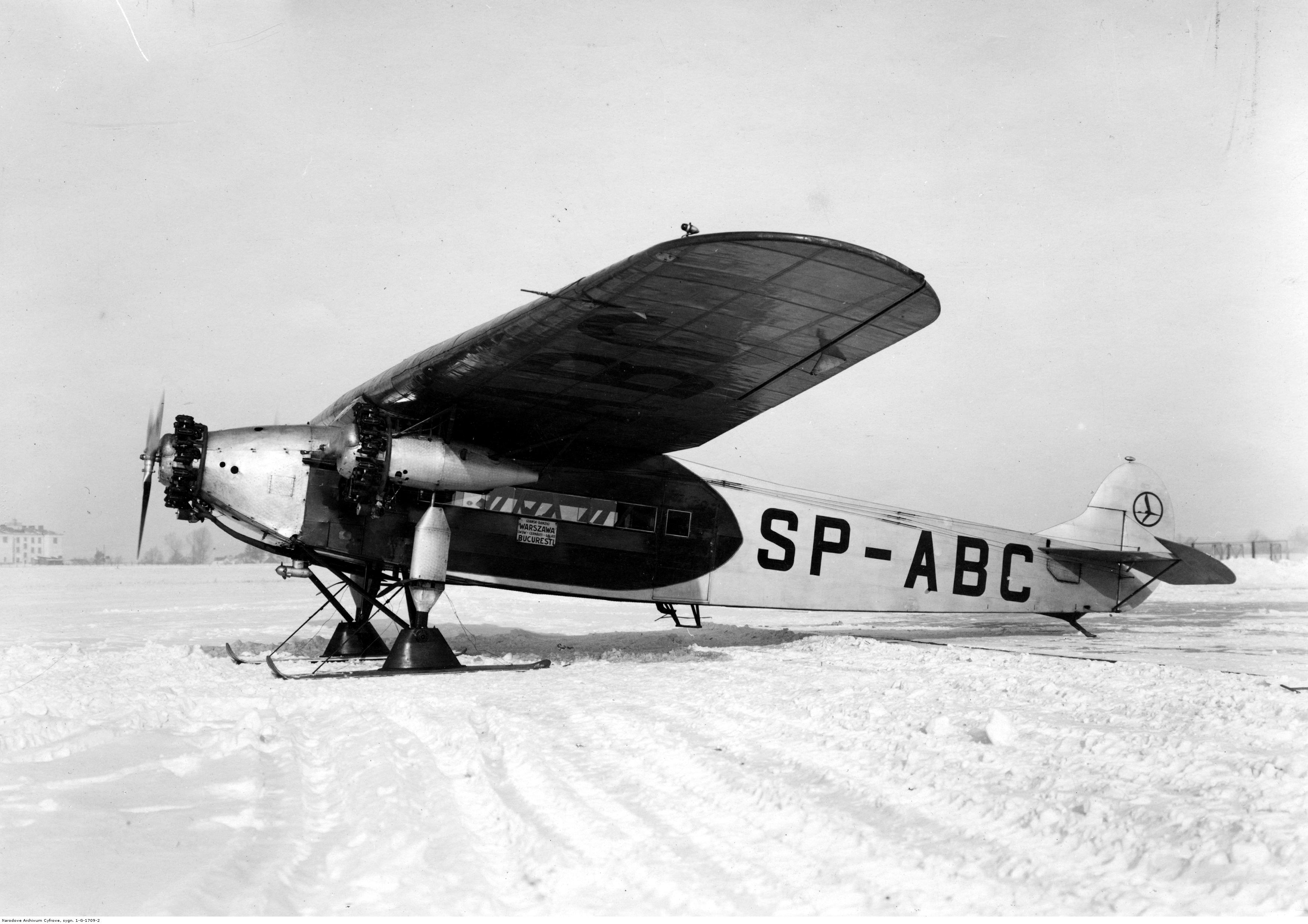
A trimotor Fokker F.VIIB-3m, registration SP-ABC (equipped with skis), serving the Warsaw-Bucharest route.

When the airline was founded in 1928, Poland's State Treasury held 86% of shares, with the rest belonging to the Province of Silesia and the city of Poznań. In the early 1930s, in addition to existing services from Warsaw to Kraków, Poznań, Gdańsk and Lviv, new services to Bydgoszcz and Katowice were introduced. It was also at this point, in 1931, when LOT's well-renowned logo, the "Flying Crane" (designed by the graphic artist Tadeusz Gronowski, and still in use today) was picked as the winning entry of the airline's logo design competition.

Original logo design from 1929, by Tadeusz Gronowski

In the same year, the company's first multi-segment international flight along the route Warsaw – Lviv – Czerniowce – Bucharest was launched. In 1932, LOT began flying to Vilnius. In next years there followed services to Berlin, Athens, Helsinki, Budapest, including some waypoints. By 1939 the lines were extended to Beirut, Rome, Copenhagen, reaching 10,250 km (6,370 mi). The Douglas DC-2, Lockheed Model 10A Electra and Model 14H Super Electra joined the fleet in 1935, 1936 and 1938 respectively. (During this period, LOT had 10 Lockheed 10As, 10 Lockheed 14s, 3 DC-2s and 1 Ju 52/3mge). Several Polish aircraft designs were tested, but only the single-engined PWS-24 airliner was finally acquired. In 1934, after five years of operating under the LOT name, the airline received new head offices, technical facilities, hangars, workshops, and warehouses located at the new, modern Warsaw Okęcie Airport. This constituted a move from the airline's previous base at Pole Mokotowskie, as this airport had become impossible to operate safely due its gradual absorption into Warsaw's urban and residential areas.

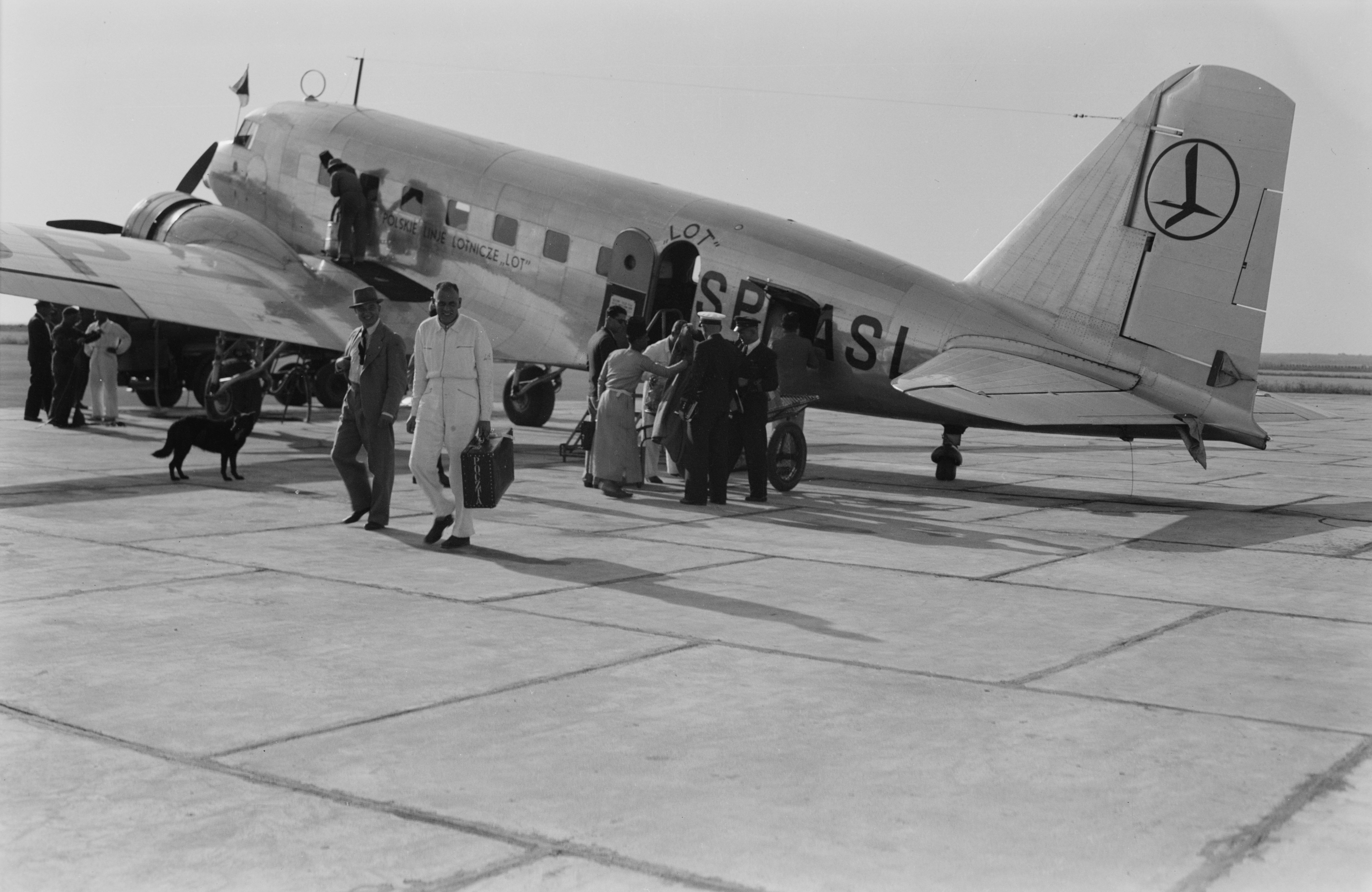
Passengers disembark a pre-war LOT Douglas DC-2 aircraft.

In 1938, LOT changed its name, following that year's Polish spelling reform, from Polskie Linje Lotnicze 'LOT' to Polskie Linie Lotnicze 'LOT'. That same year, a well-publicised transatlantic test flight from Los Angeles to Warsaw via Buenos Aires, Natal and Dakar, aimed at judging the feasibility of introducing passenger service on the Poland-United States route, was successfully executed. There were plans to introduce London and Moscow flights, and even a transatlantic service in 1940. The airline had carried 218,000 passengers before services were suspended due to the outbreak of World War II on 1 September 1939. Most of LOT's aircraft were subsequently evacuated to Romania, two to the Baltic states, and three L-14Hs to Great Britain. In 1939 LOT had 697 employees, including 25 pilots, most of which were evacuated along with the planes. The 13 airliners that got to Romania were seized by the Romanian government. For the duration of the Second World War, LOT's operations were suspended.

=== LOT during the Polish People's Republic ===
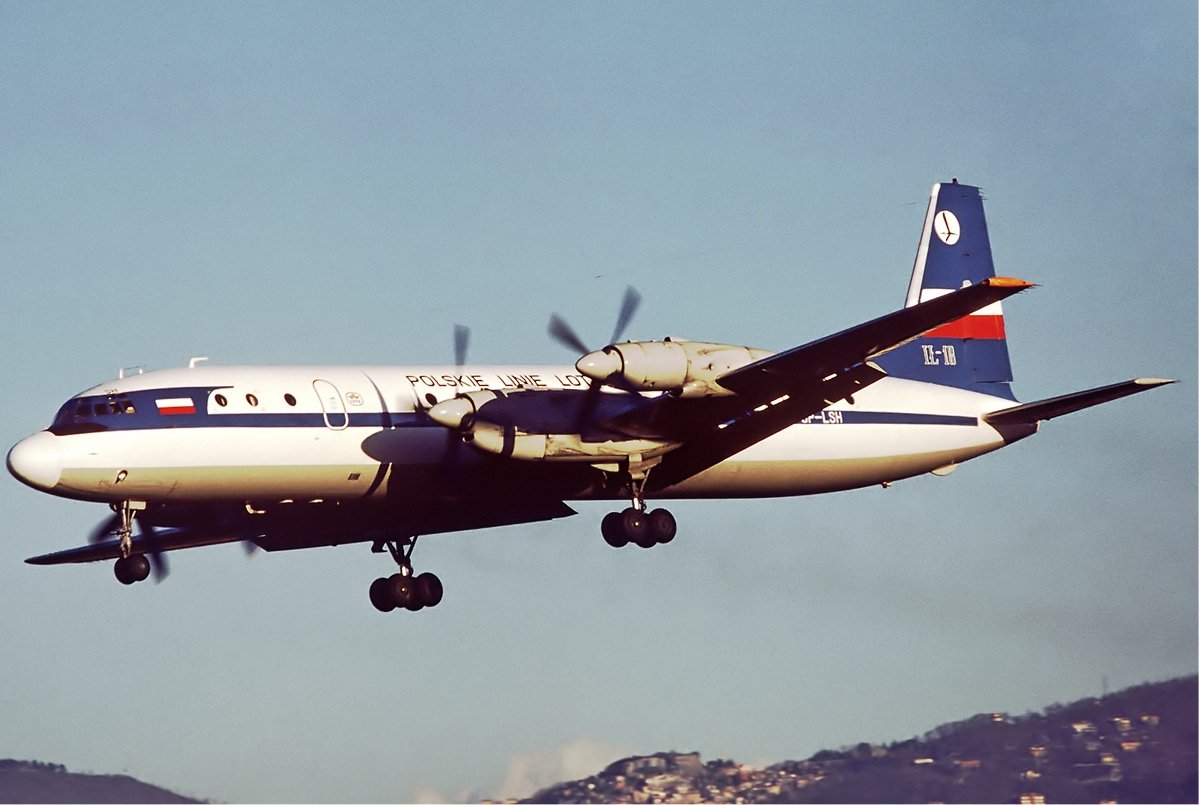
A LOT Ilyushin Il-18 landing at Rome Ciampino Airport in 1977.

After the Soviet occupation of Poland, from August 1944 until December 1945, the Polish Air Force maintained basic transport in the country. From March 1945 there were regular routes maintained by Civil Aviation Department of the Air Force. On 10 March 1945 the Polish Government reintroduced LOT as a state-owned enterprise (Przedsiębiorstwo Państwowe Polskie Linie Lotnicze 'LOT'), which would mainly fly Soviet-built aircraft, owing to the tensions of the Cold War and Poland being a member of the Warsaw Pact. In 1946, seven years after services were first suspended, the airline restarted its operations after receiving ten Soviet-built ex-Air Force Lisunov Li-2Ts, then further passenger Li-2Ps and nine Douglas C-47s. Both domestic and international services restarted that year, first to Berlin, Paris, Stockholm and Prague. In 1947 there were added routes to Bucharest, Budapest, Belgrad and Copenhagen. Five modern, although troublesome SE.161 Languedocs joined the fleet for a short period in 1947–1948, followed by five Ilyushin Il-12Bs in 1949; 13–20 Ilyushin Il-14s then followed in 1955–1957. After the end of Stalinism in Poland, several Western aircraft would be acquired; five Convair 240s in 1957 and three Vickers Viscounts in 1962. These proved to be the last until the 1990s. After that, the composition of the airline's fleet shifted exclusively to Soviet-produced aircraft. Only in 1955 LOT inaugurated services to Moscow, being the centre of the Marxist–Leninist world, and to Vienna. Services to London and Zürich were not re-established until 1958, and to Rome until 1960.

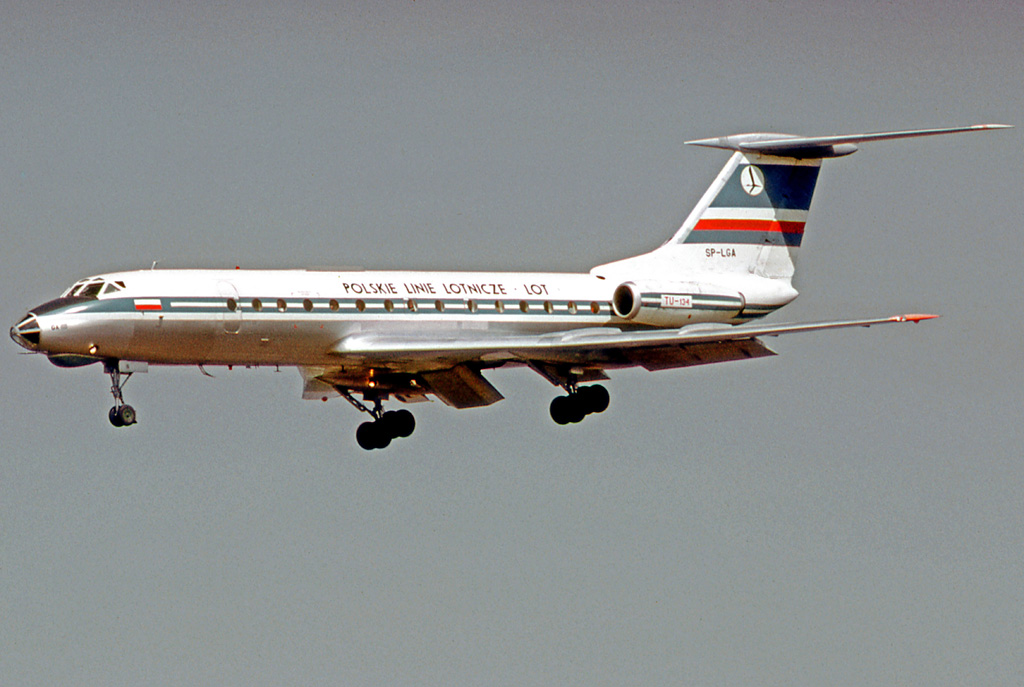
A LOT Tupolev Tu-134, 1974

Nine Ilyushin Il-18 turboprop airliners were introduced in June 1961, leading to the establishment of routes to Africa and the Middle East, and in 1963 LOT expanded its routes to serve Cairo. In the 1970s there were added lines to Baghdad, Beirut, Benghazi, Damascus and Tunis. The Antonov An-24 was delivered from April 1966 (20 used, on domestic routes), followed by the first jet airliners Tupolev Tu-134 in November 1968 (which coincided with the opening of a new international terminal at Warsaw's Okęcie Airport). The Tu-134s were operated on European routes. The Ilyushin Il-62 long-range jet airliner inaugurate the first transatlantic routes in the history of Polish air transport to Toronto in 1972 as a charter flight and a regular flight to New York City in 1973. LOT began service on its first Far East destination – Bangkok via Dubai and Bombay in 1977.

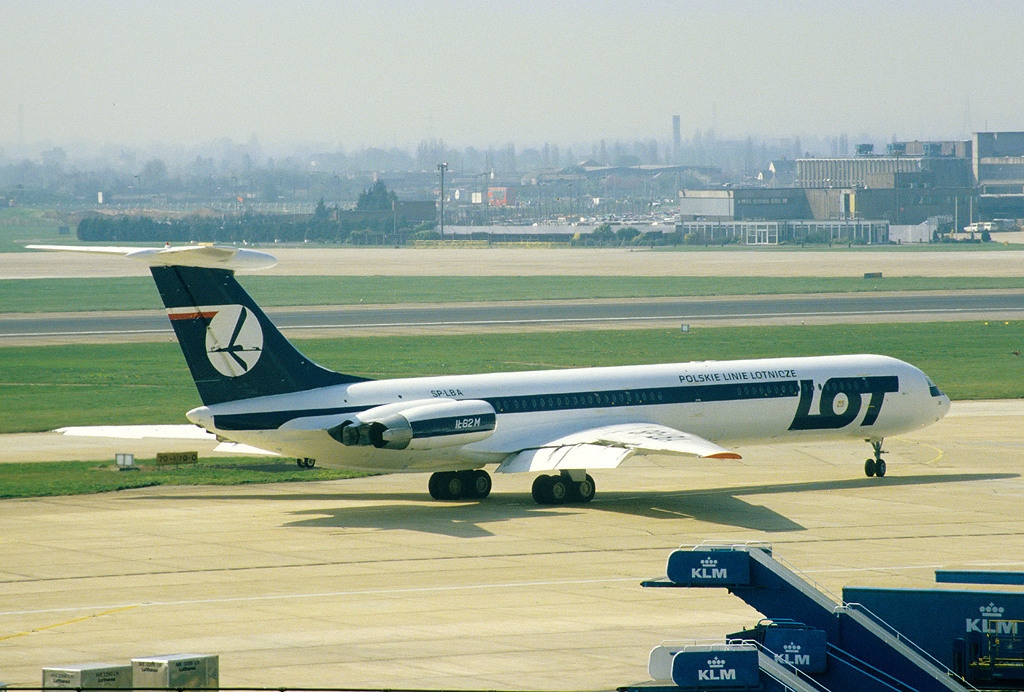
A LOT Ilyushin Il-62 at Heathrow Airport in 1984.

In 1977 the airline introduced its current livery (despite occasional changes, notably in corporate typography), designed by Roman Duszek and Andrzej Zbrożek, with the large 'LOT' inscription in blue on the front fuselage, and a blue tailplane. However, despite livery changes over the years, the 1929 logo designed by Tadeusz Gronowski, remains the same to this day.

In the autumn of 1981, commercial air traffic in Poland neared collapse in the wake of the communist government's crackdown on dissenters in the country after the rise of the banned Solidarity movement. During this period many Western airlines also suspended their flights to Warsaw. With the 13 December declaration of Martial Law, all LOT connections were suspended. Charter flights to New York and Chicago resumed only in 1984, and eventually, regular flight connections were restored on 28 April 1985. Tupolev Tu-154 mid-range airliners were acquired, after the withdrawal of Il-18 and Tu-134 aircraft from LOT's fleet in the 1980s, and were deployed successively on most European and Middle East routes. In 1986 transatlantic charter flights also reached Detroit and Los Angeles.

By the end of 1989 LOT had hosted that year's IATA congress and reached a milestone annual load-factor of 2.3 million passengers carried over the year.

=== Post-1989 LOT Polish Airlines ===
After the fall of the communist system in Poland in 1989 the fleet shifted back to Western aircraft, beginning with acquisitions of the Boeing 767-200 in April 1989, followed by the Boeing 767-300 in March 1990, ATR 72 in August 1991, Boeing 737-500 in December 1992 and finally the Boeing 737-400 in April 1993. LOT was among the first Central European airlines to operate American aircraft. From the mid-1980s to early 1990s LOT flew from Warsaw to Chicago, Edmonton, Montreal, Newark, New York City and Toronto. These routes primarily served the large Polish communities (Polonia) in North America.

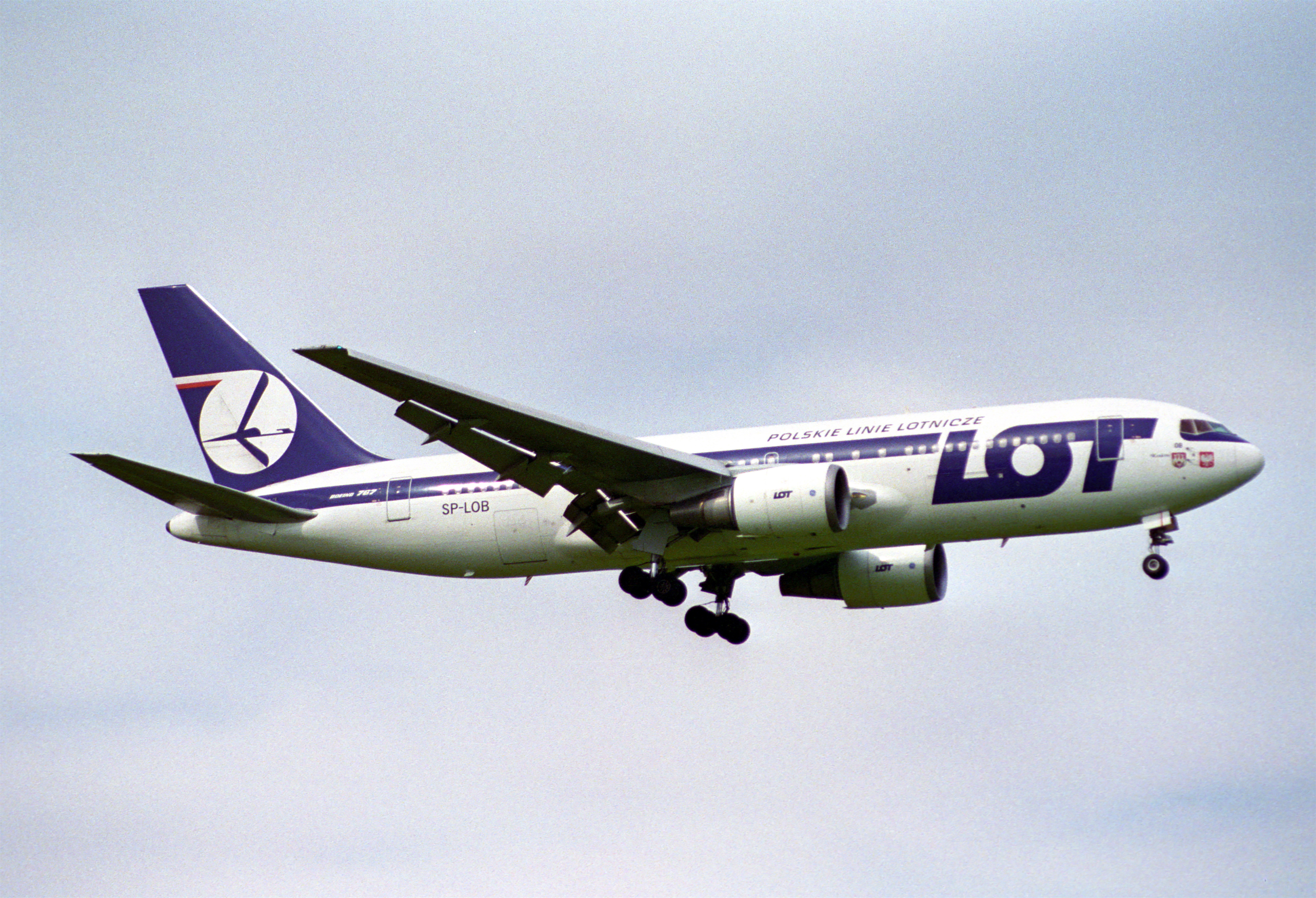
LOT's acquisition of long-range Boeing 767s, allowed it to reposition itself as a transit airline. Seen here is a Boeing 767-200 in 1997

In 1990, LOT expanded its route network to include new international destinations such as Kyiv, Lviv, Minsk and Vilnius. In 1993, LOT began to expand its Western European operations, inaugurating, in quick succession, flights to Oslo, Frankfurt and Düsseldorf; operations at Poland's other regional airports outside Warsaw were also expanded around this time.

In 1994 the airline signed a codesharing agreement with American Airlines on flights to and from Warsaw as well as connecting flights in the United States and Poland operated by both companies; flights to Thessaloniki, Zagreb and Nice were inaugurated, and according to an IATA report, in this year LOT had the youngest fleet of any airline in the world. After years of planning, in 1997 LOT set up a sister airline, EuroLOT, which took over domestic flights. The airline was developed with the hope that it would increase transit passenger-flow through Warsaw's Chopin Airport, while at the same time providing capacity on routes with smaller load factors and play a part in developing LOT as the largest transit airline in Central and Eastern Europe. By 1999 LOT had purchased a number of small Embraer 145 regional jets in order to expand its short-haul fleet, and had, with the approval of the Minister of the State Treasury, begun a process of selling shares to the Swiss company SAirGroup Holding; this then led to the airline's incorporation into the Qualiflyer Group.

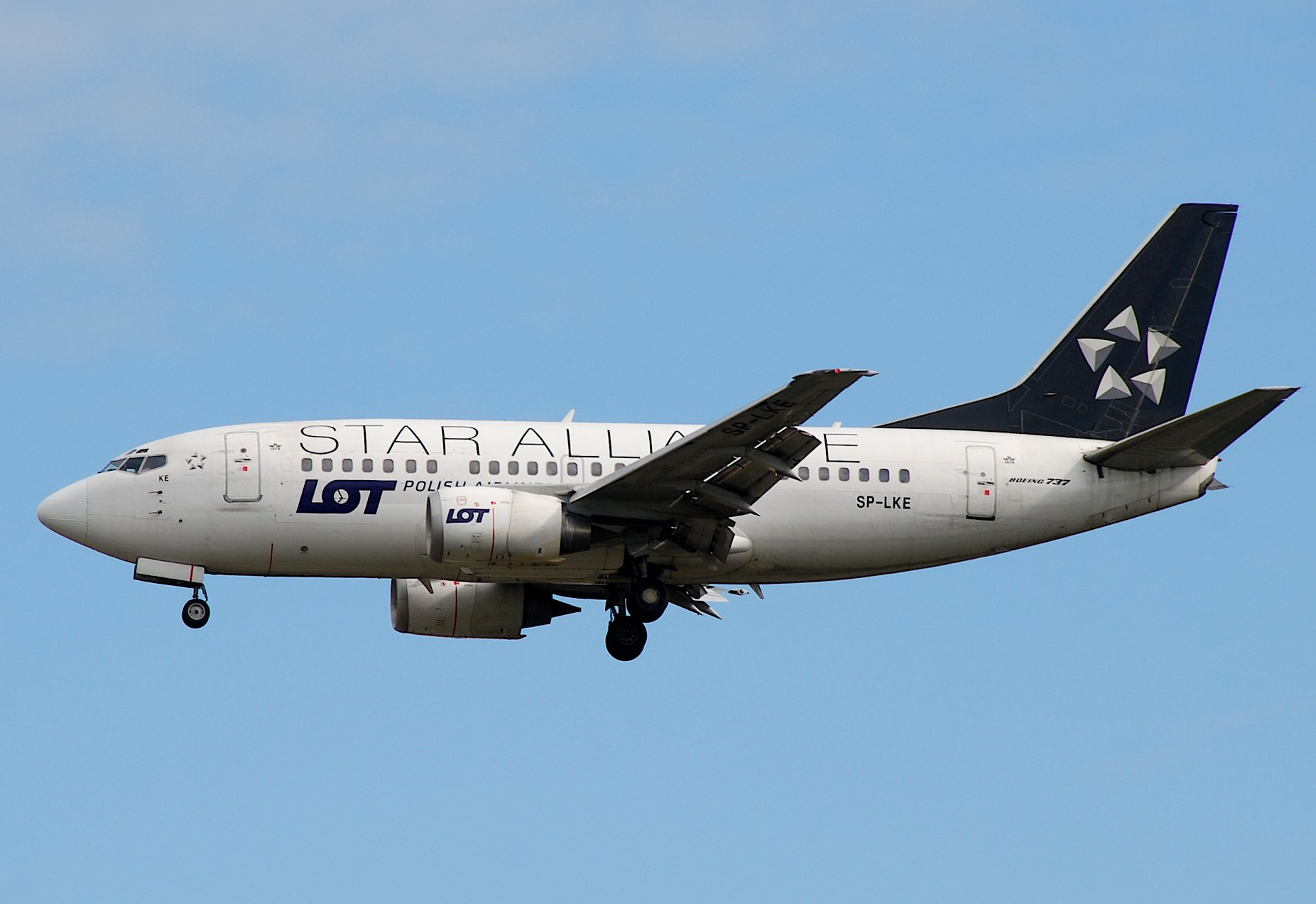
LOT became the eleventh full member of the Star Alliance in 2003. Pictured is a Boeing 737-500 in the alliance's special livery (2009).

Expansion of LOT's route network continued in the early 2000s and the potential of the airline's hub at Warsaw Chopin Airport to become a major transit airport was realised. In 2000 LOT took delivery of its largest ever order of 11 aircraft, and by 2001 it carried a record 3 million customers in one year. This expansion led to the reconstruction of much of LOT's ground infrastructure, and by 2002 a new central Warsaw head office was opened. On 26 October 2003, after the collapse of the Qualiflyer Group, LOT became the 14th member of the Star Alliance. By 2006 a new base of operations, with the reconstruction of Warsaw Chopin Airport, had opened, thus allowing LOT's full transit airline potential to be developed for the first time. The new airport was much larger than any previous airport in Poland.

LOT created the low-cost carrier Centralwings in 2004; however, the company was dissolved and reincorporated into LOT after just five years of operations due to its long-term unprofitability and LOT's desire to redeploy aircraft within its own fleet.

=== 2008–2019 ===
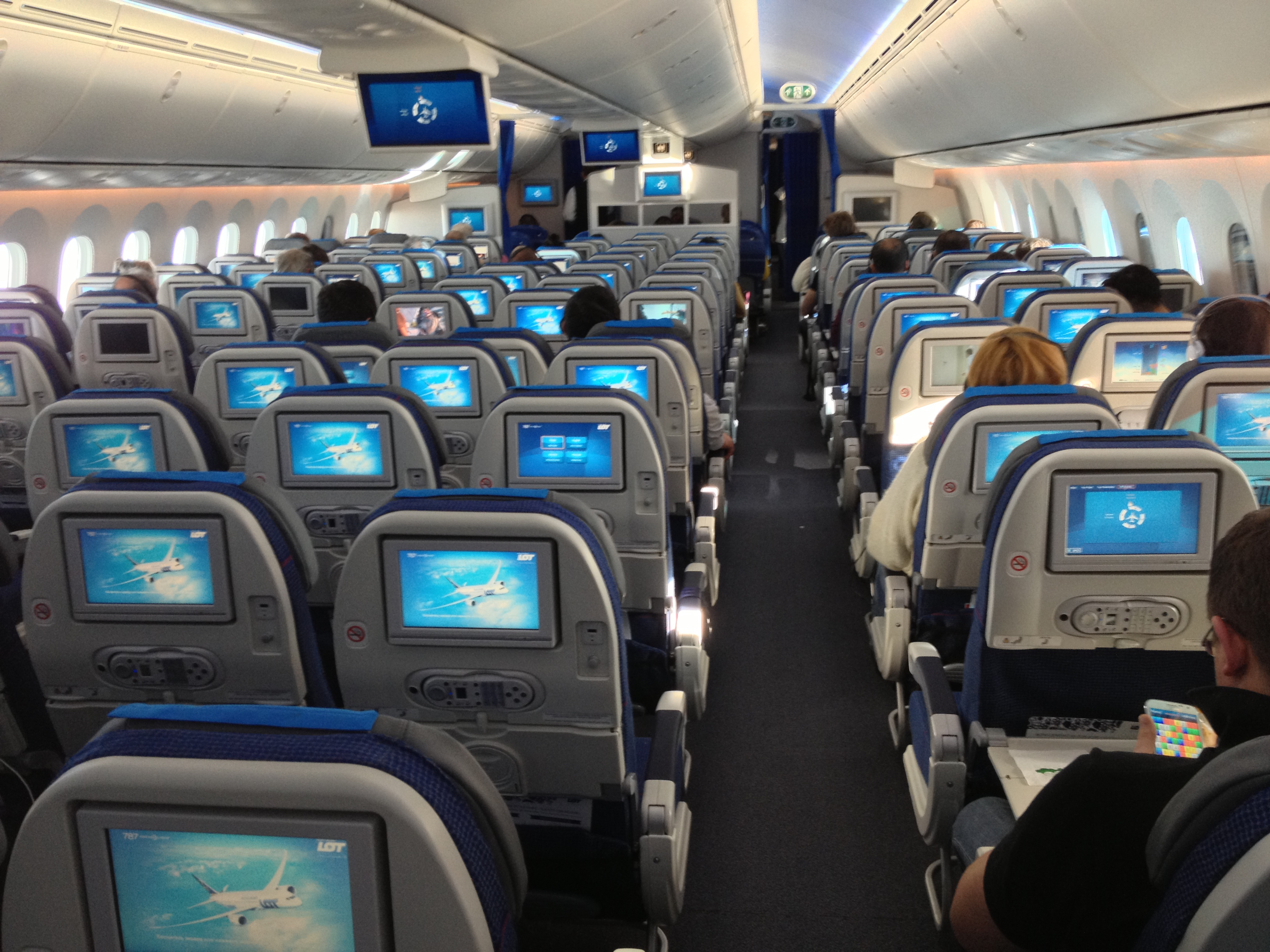
The economy class cabin of a LOT Boeing 787 Dreamliner.

In 2008, LOT opened a new flight to Beijing, but this lasted just one month, in the period before the 2008 Beijing Olympics. The reason given by the airline for the discontinuation of the service was the need to route aircraft via an air corridor to the south of Kazakhstan (as LOT did not have permission for flights over Siberia from the Russian government), which was making the services too long and thus unprofitable.

LOT started new services to Yerevan and Beirut and resumed Tallinn, Kaliningrad, Gothenburg and Bratislava flights. with its newly acquired Embraer aircraft in the summer of 2010. In October of the same year LOT resumed service to Asia, with three weekly flights on the Warsaw – Hanoi route. In addition to this, new services to Tbilisi, Damascus, and Cairo were inaugurated.

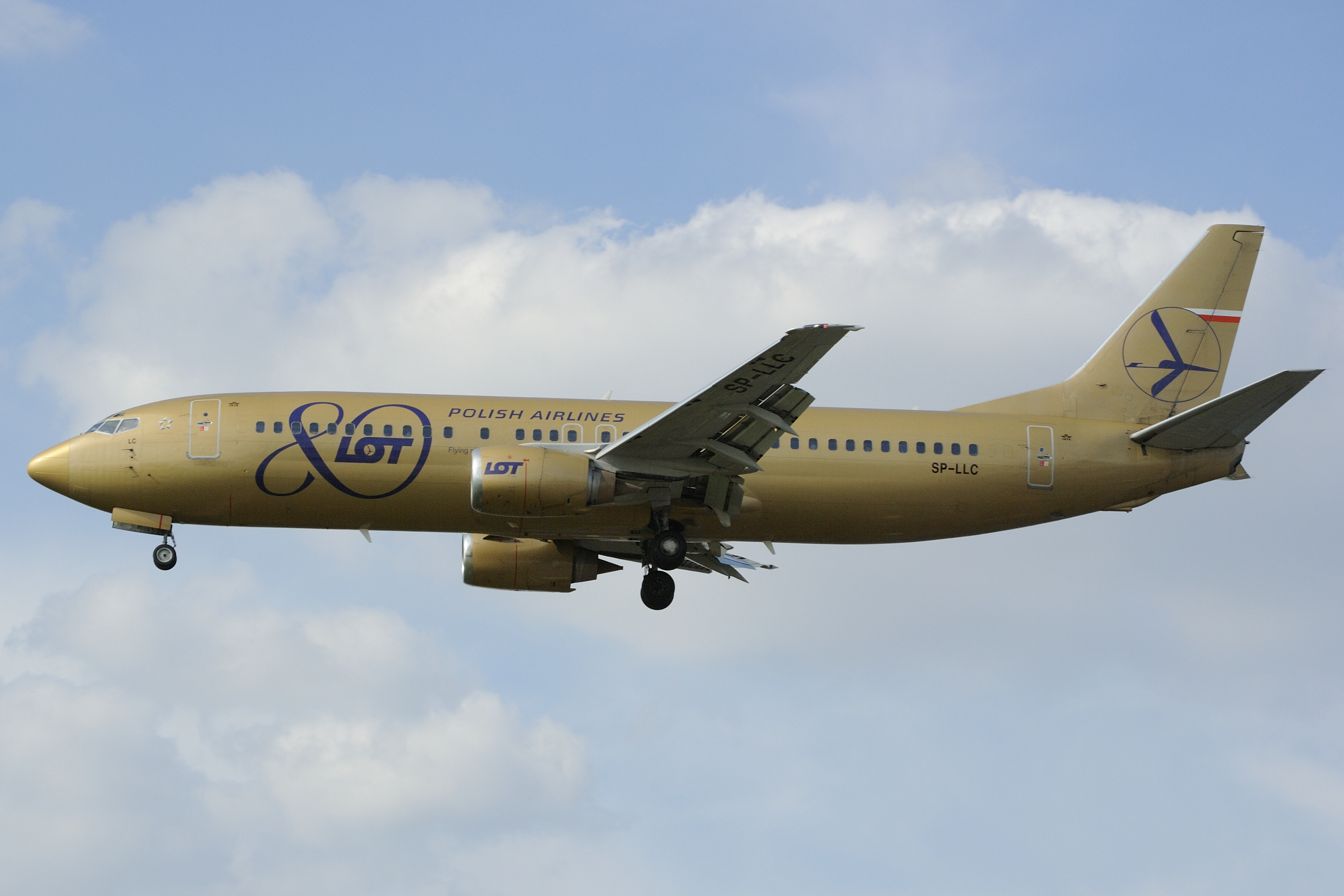
LOT celebrated the 80th anniversary of its foundation in 2009. The event was marked by the application of a gold livery to one of the airline's Boeing 737-400s.

In 2010 LOT cancelled flights, after 14 years of operation, between Kraków and Chicago and New York, citing profitability concerns and a lack of demand. The last US-Kraków flight departed on 27 October 2010 from Chicago O'Hare Airport. The aircraft previously used on this route were then re-deployed to serve LOT's Warsaw-Hanoi route. This route to Hanoi was largely underutilised by European carriers and proved very successful for LOT in the beginning.

On 31 May 2010, CEO of LOT Sebastian Mikosz said that the airline would be replacing its fleet to meet a goal of one-third new by 2011. Replacement already started with Embraer E-Jets 175/170. For domestic expanded operations, LOT purchased Dash 8-Q400 over ATR 72-600 aircraft.

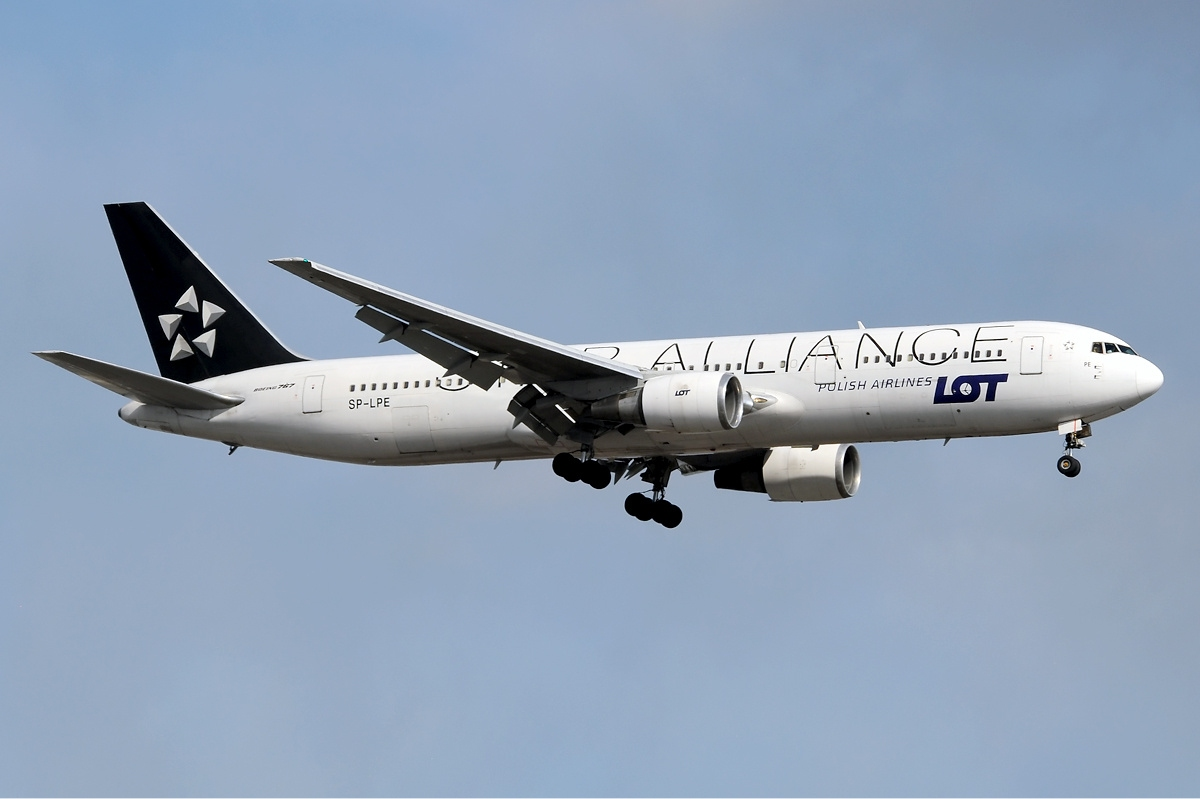
A LOT Boeing 767-300ER wearing the Star Alliance livery.

On 5 February 2011, the new CEO of LOT, Marcin Piróg, announced that the airline was considering opening services to Baku, Sochi, Stuttgart, Oslo, Gothenburg, Dubai, Kuwait, and Ostrava from its Warsaw hub in the near future. Previously planned flights to Donetsk had already been inaugurated, as had Tokyo, and the resumption of Beijing flights. This became feasible after the finalizing of an agreement on Siberian overflight permits for LOT by the Polish and Russian governments in November 2011. As a result of the agreement, LOT received new take-off and landing slots at Moscow's Sheremetyevo International Airport. Although delayed from the original plans, LOT began flights to Tokyo on 13 January 2016, with flights three times per week.

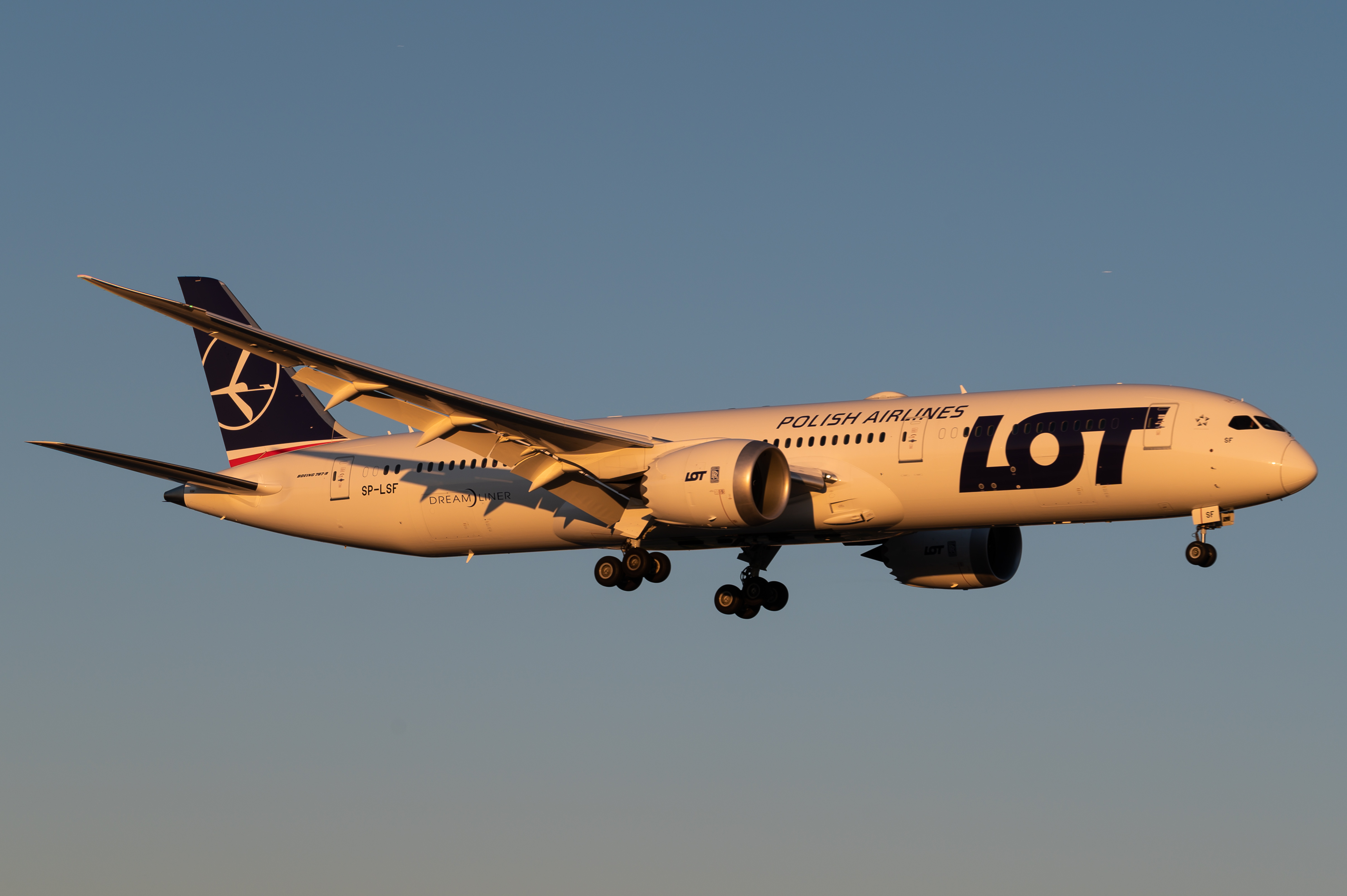
LOT Boeing 787-9 Dreamliner (2019)

In 2010/11 LOT announced its new 'East meets West' route expansion policy, which saw the airline add several new Asian destinations to its schedule over the coming years. The policy aimed to take advantage of LOT's perspective as a transit airline and the substantial passenger growth seen on Europe-Asia flights in recent years. Also, in line with this policy LOT introduced premium economy class on all Boeing 787 aircraft. Additionally, lie-flat seats were made available in business class, and all of the airline's new long-haul aircraft were fitted with Thales personal entertainment systems.

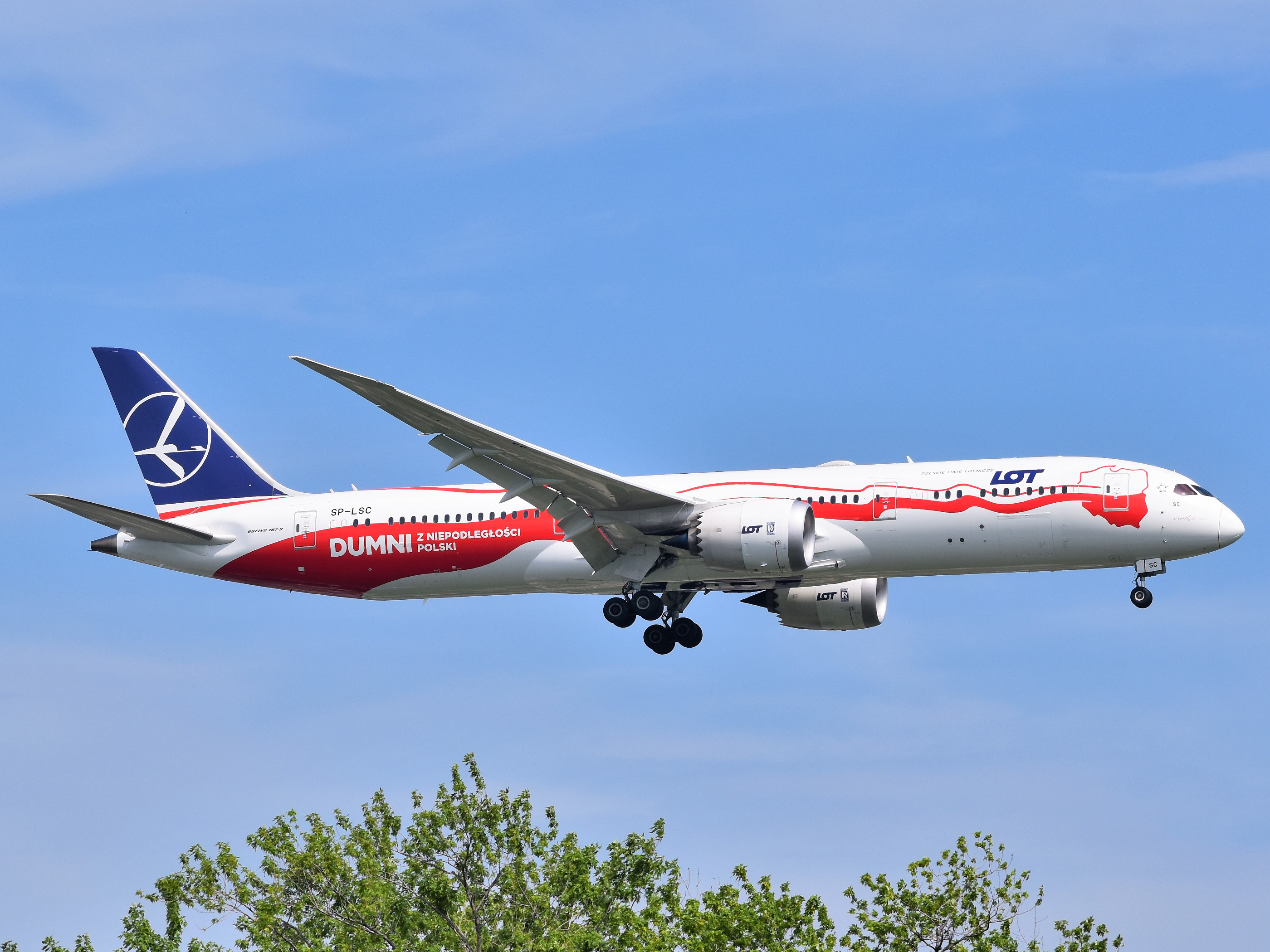
In 2018, two new aircraft (this Boeing 787-9 Dreamliner and a 737 MAX-8) were painted in liveries commemorating Poland's independence.

In June 2012, LOT announced all services to New York would be centralized from Newark and JFK Terminal 4 to JFK Terminal 1 from October 2012. It would also enter into a codeshare agreement with JetBlue to increase the number of onward connections available to its customers. In July 2012 it was announced that a planned sale of a major stake in the airline to Turkish Airlines would not go ahead. The main problem was the inability of Turkish Airlines to own a majority stake as it is not a European Union company.

On 21 June 2015, 1,400 of the airline's passengers were affected as 22 of its flights were impacted after hackers attacked airline computers that were issuing flight plans at Warsaw's Okecie airport. LOT spokesman Adrian Kubicki said: "We're using state-of-the-art computer systems, so this could potentially be a threat to others in the industry."

Amidst a restructuring plan which saw the airline return to profitability for the first time in seven years, a 22 June 2015 press conference revealed details about the airline's prospects. These included reinstating routes renounced as part of EU sanctions imposed following Polish government aid granted to ensure the airline's survival, as well as new long haul routes to Asia and North America.

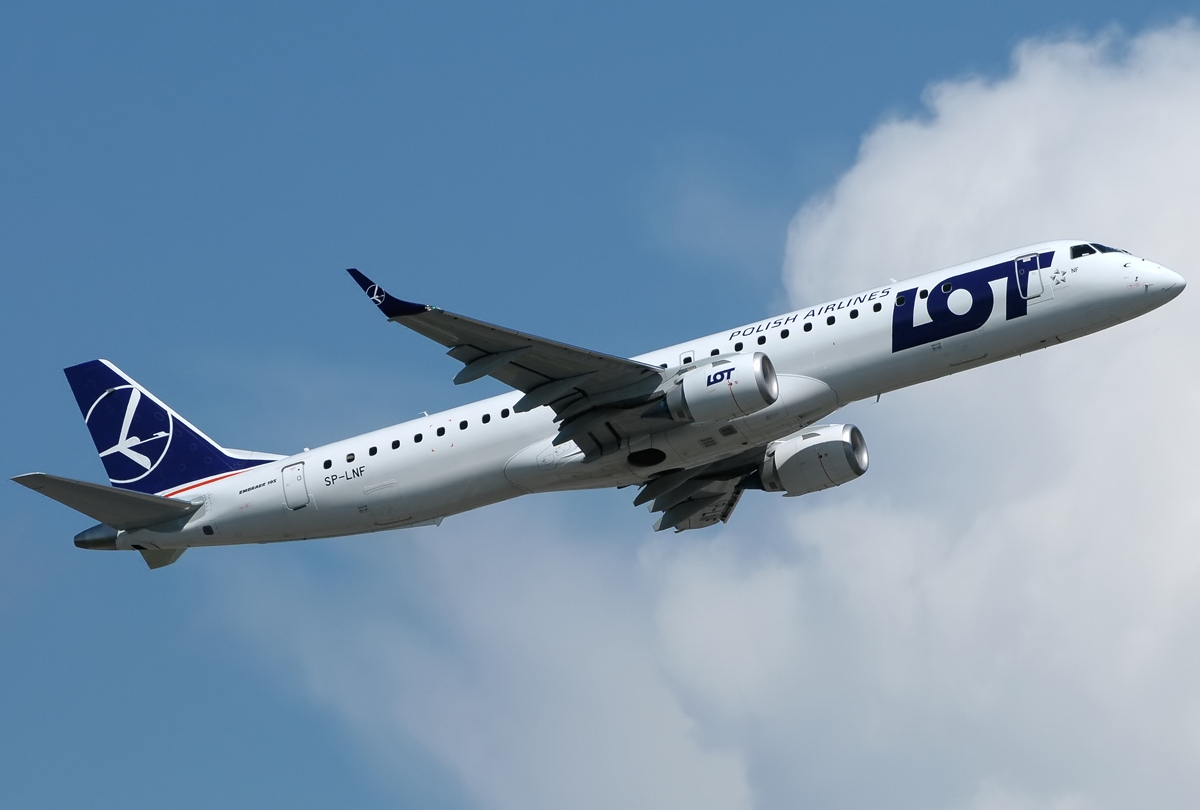
LOT Embraer 190

Air Lease Corporation confirmed on 13 October 2016, the placement of six Boeing 737 MAX 8 aircraft with LOT, and options to lease five further aircraft of the same type. Long haul plans saw the addition of further Boeing 787 aircraft, increasing the total to 16. The airline was evaluating the economics of future narrow body and wide body acquisitions to broaden expansion initiatives. The airline's CEO said that they were evaluating the Airbus A220 and Embraer E-Jet-E2 families, as well as the Boeing 787 Dreamliner and Airbus A350 XWB offerings.

In May 2018, LOT Polish Airlines started scheduled flights from outside Poland beginning with long-haul routes from Budapest to John F. Kennedy International Airport in New York City and O'Hare International Airport in Chicago. In May 2019, it started flying from Vilnius to London City airport, and from Tallinn to Brussels and Stockholm two months later. The latter two flights were suspended in early 2020 due to the coronavirus pandemic.

In December 2018, LOT was ranked the quietest among 50 airlines that regularly fly to Heathrow Airport in London. LOT spokesman Adrian Kubicki attributed the result to modern Boeing 737 MAX-8s with modern CFM International engines being used, and to the airline's pilots’ precise landing technique using the continuous descent approach (CDA) procedure.

=== Recent developments ===
On 24 January 2020, the owner of LOT, the Polish Aviation Group (Polska Grupa Lotnicza or PGL) announced that it would acquire Condor Flugdienst. On 2 April 2020 it was announced that the sale had fallen through, with the COVID-19 pandemic being a key factor.

The company temporarily suspended operations on 15 March 2020 due to the COVID-19 pandemic, and domestic Polish flights restarted only on 1 June 2020, while international flights were resumed on a very limited basis from 1 July 2020. LOT Polish Airlines recorded a net loss of US$365.2 million in 2020, with a loss in sales of $138.1 million.

The airline posted a gross profit of $28 million for 2022, and a net profit of $276 million for 2023.

In February 2025, LOT announced it would end long-haul operations from Budapest, Hungary, from where it served a single route to Seoul by March 2025. This leaves all of their long-haul operations at Polish airports.

In June 2025, LOT received the title of the best airline in Eastern Europe according to the Skytrax ranking.

The company set a new all-time record by serving 1,185,946 passengers in a single month in July 2025.

In July 2025, LOT announced that it plans on resuming flights to Kyiv and Lviv, Ukraine, within six weeks after a ceasefire and once Ukrainian airspace is declared safe. During the Russian invasion of Ukraine, millions of Ukrainian refugees settled in Poland.

In December 2025, information surfaced that LOT was planning on merging with the Czech airline Smartwings. Ultimately, Smartwings was acquired by a Turkish charter airline, Pegasus Airlines.

== Corporate affairs ==
=== Privatisation ===
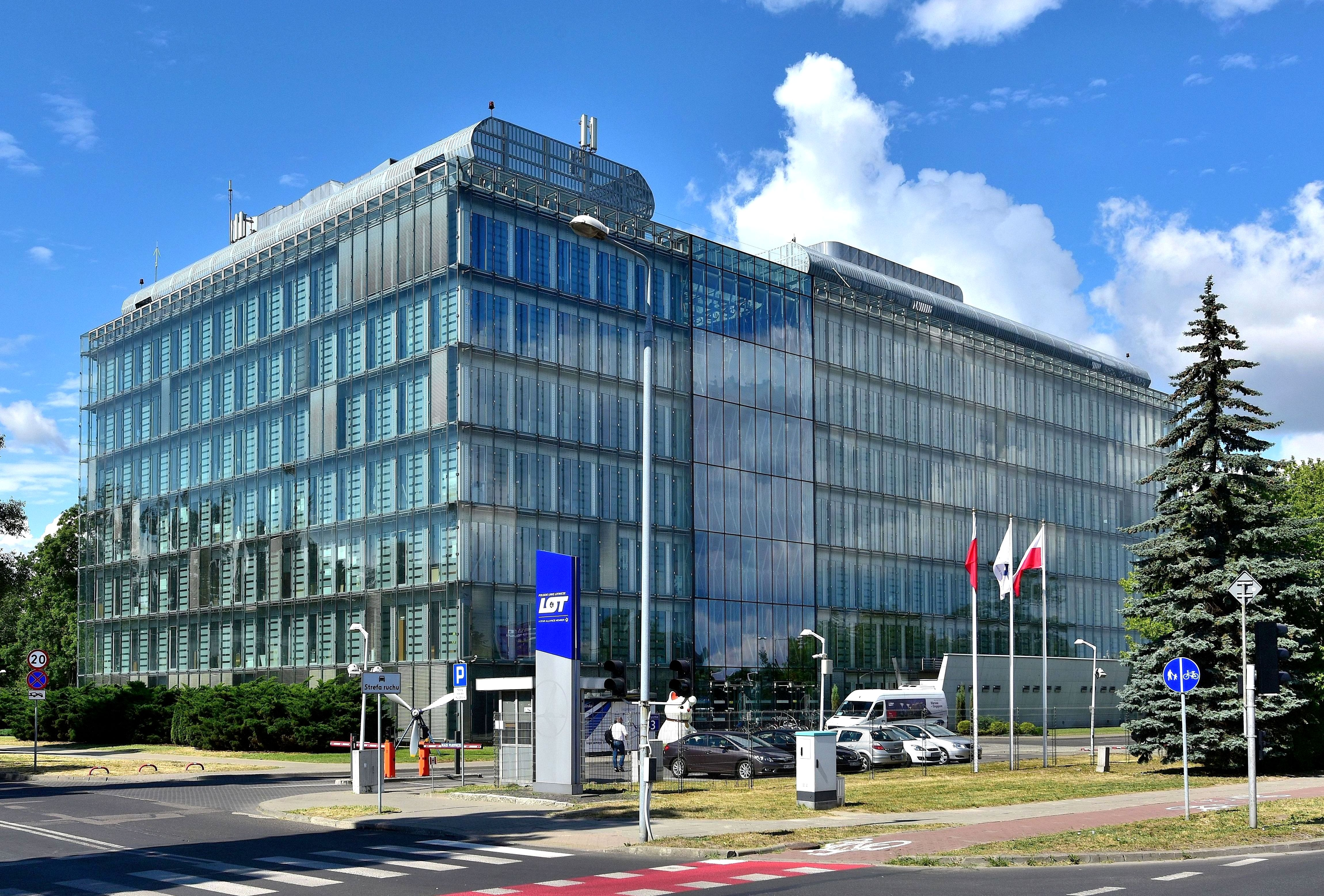
LOT's Warsaw head office.

LOT is wholly owned by Polish Aviation Group (Polish: Polska Grupa Lotnicza S. A.), a state-owned holding company.

In 2011, LOT was considered for privatisation. Although advanced discussions were held with Turkish Airlines, no agreement was reached.. This was largely due to restrictions preventing non-EU carriers from acquiring a majority stake in an EU airline.

=== Subsidiaries ===
Current subsidiaries

- LOT Charters - a wholly owned subsidiary operating charter flights for Polish tour operators.
- LOT Flight Academy.

Former subsidiaries

- Nordica - a 49% stake was owned by LOT between 2016 and 2020.
- EuroLOT, a formerly wholly owned subsidiary airline, founded on 1 July 1997. The Polish Treasury owned 62.1 percent while LOT retained 37.9 percent. In July 2012 it was confirmed that LOT wished to sell its remaining stake in EuroLOT, as part of its privatization scheme. However, on 6 February 2015, the decision was taken to liquidate the airline and integrate the majority of its fleet into LOT.
- Centralwings, a low-cost subsidiary that existed between 2004 and 2009.

== Destinations ==
LOT Polish Airlines serves a network of European destinations in addition to flights to Asia, the Middle East, northern Africa and North America.

=== Codeshare agreements ===
LOT Polish Airlines has codeshare agreements with the following airlines:

- Aegean Airlines
- Air Canada
- Air China
- Air India
- airBaltic
- All Nippon Airways
- Asiana Airlines
- Austrian Airlines
- Croatia Airlines
- EgyptAir
- El Al
- EVA Air
- ITA Airways
- JetBlue
- Lufthansa
- Luxair
- Scandinavian Airlines
- Singapore Airlines
- Swiss International Air Lines
- TAP Air Portugal
- Turkish Airlines

== Fleet ==
=== Current fleet ===
As of October 2026, LOT Polish Airlines utilises the following aircraft:

LOT Polish Airlines fleet
Aircraft	In service	Orders	Passengers					Notes
Aircraft	In service	Orders	B	Y+	Y	Total	Refs	Notes
Airbus A220-100	—	20	TBA					Order with 44 options. Deliveries from 2027.
Airbus A220-300	—	20	TBA					Order with 44 options. Deliveries from 2027.
Boeing 737-800	6	—	—	—	186	186		
Boeing 737 MAX 8	31	7	—	—	186	186		13 aircraft with new interior delivered as of August 2026. 7 more to be leased.
Boeing 787-8	8	2	18	21	213	252		First European 787 operator. Two extra 787-8s to be leased from 2026.
Boeing 787-9	7	2	24	21	249	294		2 aircraft to be acquired from Virgin Atlantic, and will arrive in the first half of 2027
Embraer E175	11	—	—	—	82	82		To be retired and replaced by Airbus A220.
Embraer E175	2	—	VIP					Operated as VIP transport for the Ministry of National Defence.
Embraer E190	8	—	—	—	106	106		To be retired and replaced by Airbus A220.
Embraer E195	15	—	—	—	112	112		To be retired and replaced by Airbus A220.
Embraer E195	15	—	—	—	118	118		To be retired and replaced by Airbus A220.
Embraer E195-E2	3	—	—	—	136	136		
Total	93	53						

=== Historic fleet ===
LOT previously operated these types of aircraft:

- Aero Ae-45
- Airbus A330-900 (wet-leased from Air Belgium)
- Airbus A340-300 (wet-leased from Air Belgium)
- Antonov An-24
- Antonov An-26
- ATR 42 (operated by Eurolot)
- ATR 72 (operated by Eurolot from 1996)
- BAe Jetstream 31 (operated for Eurolot by Tasawi)
- Boeing 737-300
- Boeing 737-400
- Boeing 737-500
- Boeing 737-700
- Boeing 767-200ER
- Boeing 767-300ER
- Bombardier CRJ-700 (operated by Nordica)
- Bombardier CRJ-900 (operated by Nordica)
- Cessna UC-78
- Convair CV-240
- De Havilland Canada Dash 8 Q400
- Douglas DC-2
- Douglas DC-3
- Douglas DC-8-62 (leased from Arrow Air)
- Embraer ERJ-145
- Fokker F.VII A
- Fokker F.VII B
- Fokker F.VII 1M
- Fokker F.VII 3M
- Junkers F 13
- Junkers Ju 52
- Ilyushin Il-12B
- Ilyushin Il-14P
- Ilyushin Il-18
- Ilyushin Il-62
- Lisunov Li-2
- Lockheed L-10 Electra
- Lockheed L-14 Super Electra
- McDonnell Douglas DC-10-30 (leased from Finnair and Malaysia Airlines)
- PWS-24
- PZL.4 (prototype, tested only)
- PZL.44 Wicher (prototype, tested only)
- RWD 5
- SNCASE SE.161/1 Languedoc
- Tupolev Tu-134
- Tupolev Tu-134A
- Tupolev Tu-154
- Vickers Viscount 804
- Yakovlev Yak-40

=== Fleet development ===
- On 7 September 2005, the airline reached an agreement to acquire up to 14 Boeing 787s for its long-haul operations. On 7 March 2011 Boeing officially notified LOT Polish Airlines that the delivery of the 787 would be delayed for another year. The airline planned to use the 787-8 on its Warsaw-Chicago route on 16 January 2013, but the type was grounded on that same day due to issues with its batteries. On 25 April 2013, LOT announced that it would resume its 787 services on 5 June 2013.
- On 4 May 2010, LOT converted four Embraer E175 orders to Embraer E195 orders. The delivery of these aircraft began in March 2011.
- Since June 2010, LOT has operated two E175 aircraft for the Polish Ministry of National Defence. These aircraft are used to transport government officials on short and medium-haul flights.
- In 2016, the airline signed a contract for eleven leased Boeing 737 MAX-8 aircraft (six firm commitments and five options), with deliveries starting in late 2017.
- In April 2018, LOT announced the lease of three additional Boeing 787-9 aircraft from Avolon, bringing the total to 7. The three aircraft were delivered in April, June and October 2019 respectively.
- On 8 May 2024, LOT announced it would lease three brand-new Embraer E-195 E2 jets. The first arrived on 31 July 2024.
- On 27 March 2025, it was announced that LOT will lease an extra two Boeing 787-8s from 2026. This will bring LOT's 787 fleet to 17 units.
- On 16 June 2025, during the 2025 Paris Air Show, LOT signed a firm order for 40 Airbus A220s to replace its ageing Embraer E-Jet fleet. Twenty orders are for the smaller, A220-100 variant and twenty for the larger, A220-300. Deliveries are set to commence in 2027.
- In 2026, the airline took two E-175 aircraft out of service ahead of the arrival of Airbus A220s. The two aircraft are retired and to be returned to the lessor. Two more will be taken out of service in the fall. In 2004, the Polish carrier was the first airline that flew commercial flight with the Embraer 170.

== Corporate identity ==
With the delivery of new Boeing 787 aircraft between 2011 and 2012, LOT introduced a new livery. This design was intended to retain the tradition and spirit of LOT with no major or radical changes. The blue nose and broad cheat-line were removed; the 'POLSKIE LINIE LOTNICZE' titles on each aircraft's starboard side were replaced with the words 'POLISH AIRLINES'. The tailplane's design was altered minimally, with the colours of the traditional encircled crane logo being inverted and the circle becoming a simpler outline ring.

Several Embraer aircraft have worn special advertising liveries. One Embraer E175, SP-LIM, was repainted as a retrojet, into LOT's 1945 livery, for the airline's 90th anniversary.

=== Livery 1935–1939, 1945–1956 ===
Airliners featured all-natural metal silvery color, with a black crane logo on the tail, and a small black inscription: POLSKIE LINIE LOTNICZE „LOT" under or above the window line. Before 1939, there was also a rounded inscription: LOT above passenger doors (apart from the Ju 52, which also differed in having black engine covers and nacelles).

After World War II, the aircraft mostly wore a similar all-natural metal scheme, with the airline name above the window line. In the late 1940s, the Polish white and red flag was added on a rudder. From the early 1950s, a thin blue cheatline was introduced below the window line, starting with a stylized bird in front. Some aircraft flew in military schemes (green and light blue or olive drab and grey).

=== Livery 1956–1976 ===
This livery featured blue mid-level broad cheatline on the window line, with the fuselage a white colour above the cheatline and unpainted below. Early versions of this livery also featured thin blue stripes above and below the cheatline and a white tail, with small black crane logo on the fin and medium-size Polish flag on the rudder. Above the cheatline there was black inscription in italics: POLSKIE LINIE LOTNICZE »LOT«. There was also a long black stylized crane below the cockpit on most aircraft. In the early 1960s, the scheme was modernized and featured the blue cheatline without upper and lower stripes, and a blue tail fin and rudder. The Polish flag was much larger on the tail, while the crane logo was above the flag, on a white circle. There was also another Polish flag on the cheatline, behind the cockpit. On Il-18s and Il-62s, the cheatline was narrower, below the window line.

=== Livery 1977–2010s ===
LOT's iconic livery was introduced in 1977 and has undergone no major changes. The livery is essentially a predominantly white scheme with elements of traditional aviation design incorporated. The latter elements were visible in the design of the LOT livery as an area of dark blue under the cockpit windscreen, the long cheat-line painted down the side of the fuselage and the large traditional logo which is emblazoned on the tailplane.

=== Aircraft Names ===
Ilyushin Il-62 aircraft were named after famous Poles, with the first named Mikołaj Kopernik. The five Boeing 767s LOT ordered from Boeing were named after Polish cities. This practice, however, was discontinued with the arrival of Boeing 787s and the introduction of the airline's new livery. Only LOT's sixth 787, SP-LRF, was named 'Franek' after an online vote organised by the airline.

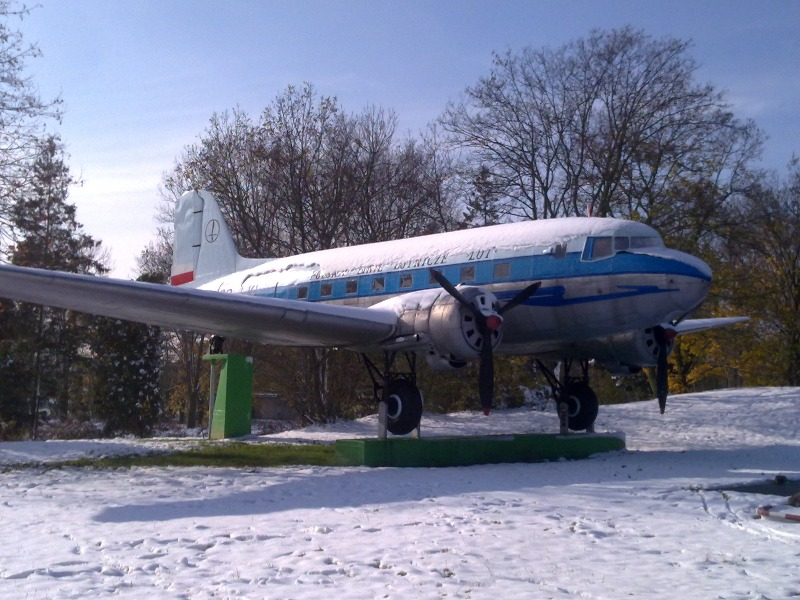
A LOT Lisunov Li-2 in the 1960s livery.

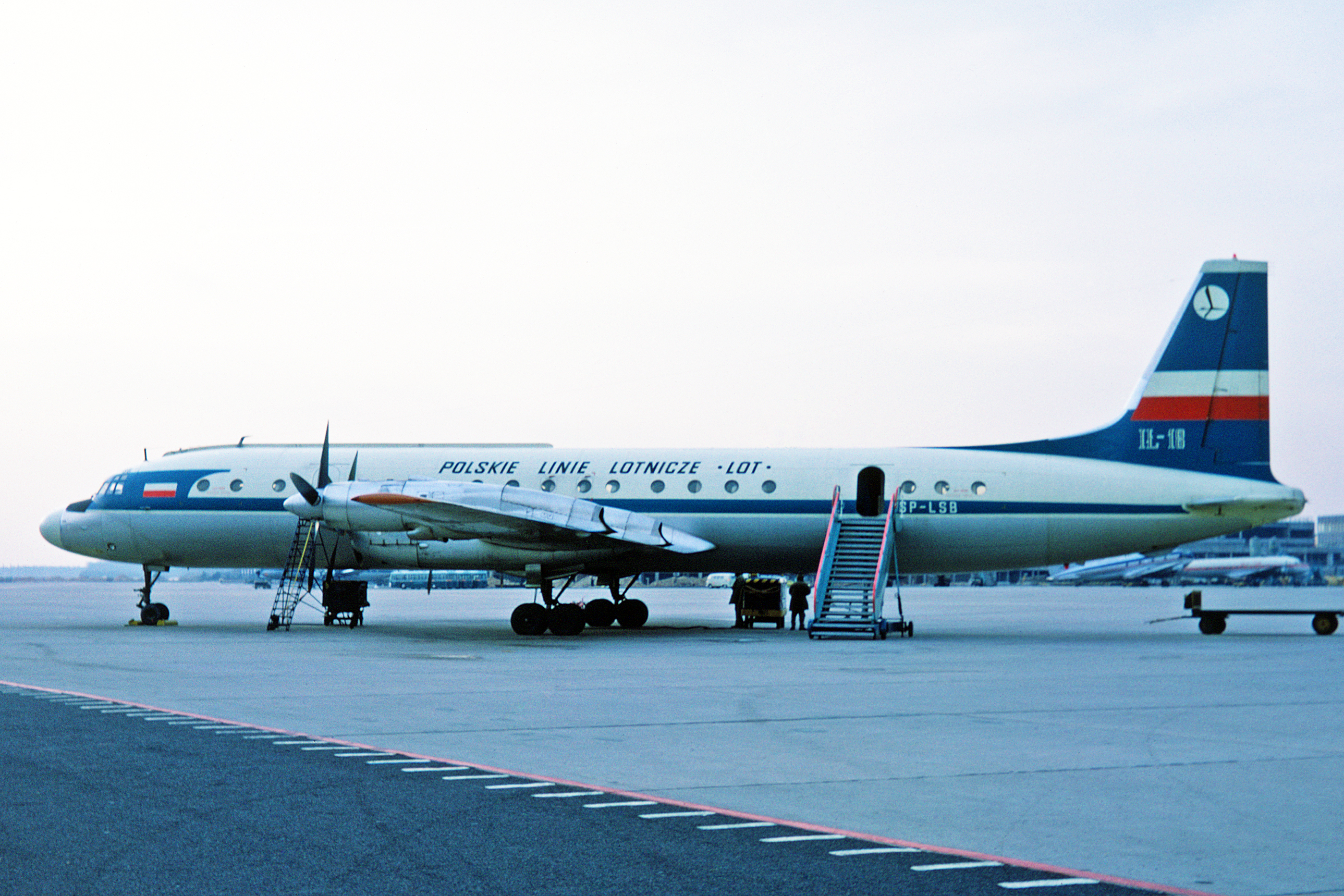
A LOT Ilyushin IL-18 in the pre-1977 livery.

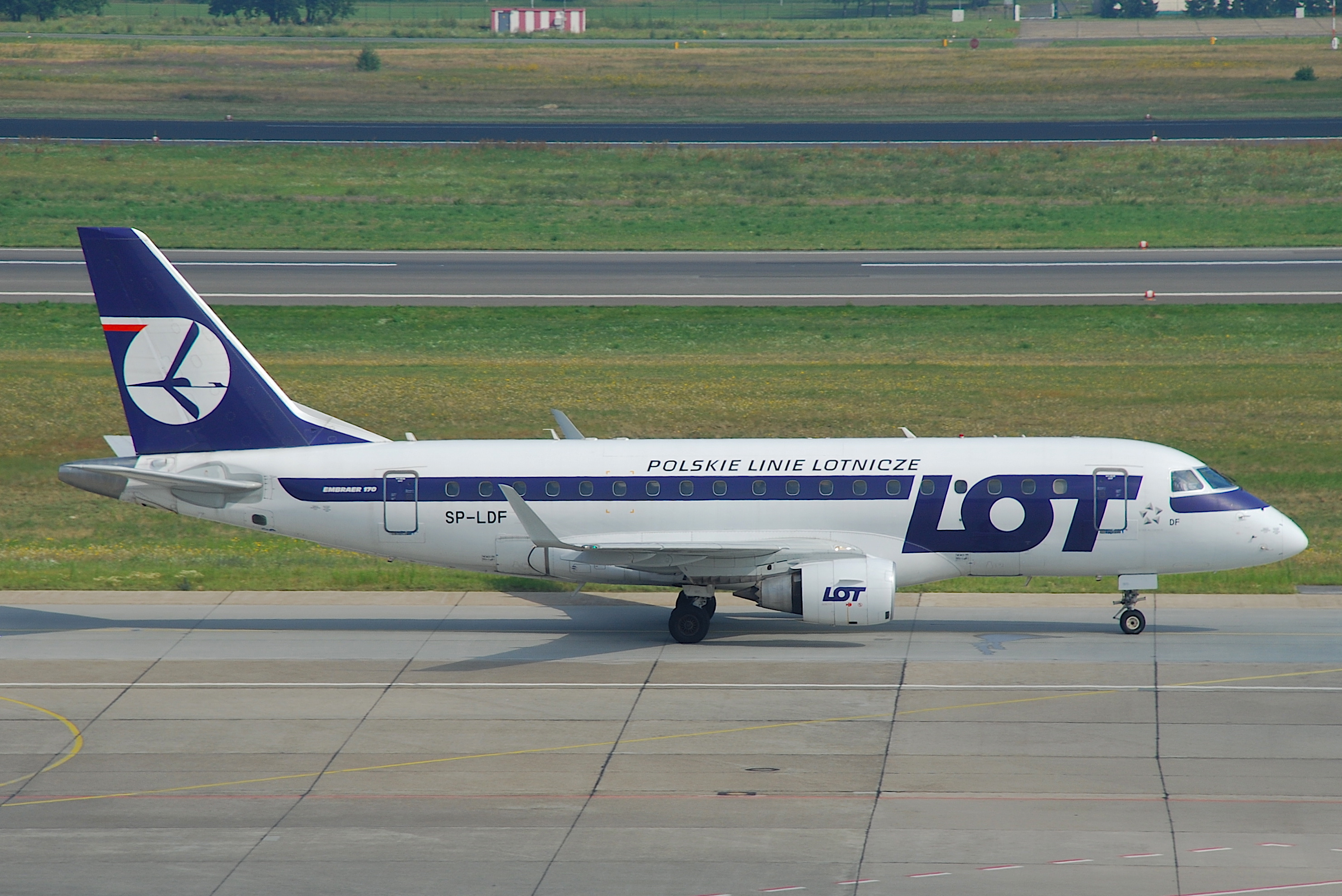
A LOT Embraer 170 in the post-1977 livery.

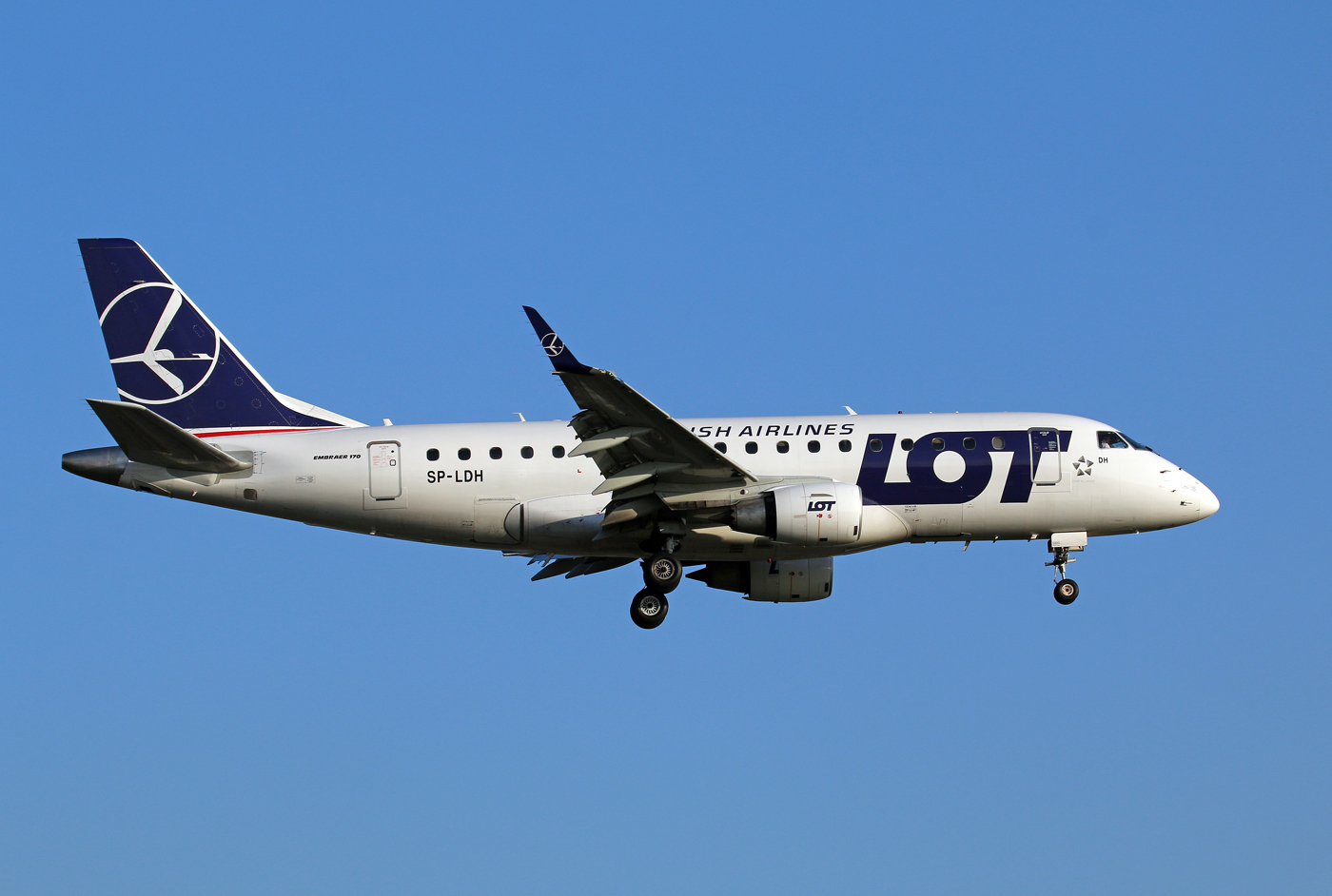
A LOT Embraer 170 in the current, post-2011 livery.

== Loyalty programme and lounges ==
=== Miles & More ===
LOT uses Lufthansa Group's Miles & More frequent-flyer program. Miles & More members can earn miles on LOT flights and Star Alliance partner flights, as well as through LOT credit cards and purchases made through LOT Polish Airlines shops. Status within Miles & More is determined by miles flown during one calendar year with specific partners. Membership levels include Basic (no minimal threshold), Frequent Traveller (Silver, 35,000-mile threshold), Senator (Gold, 100,000-mile threshold), and HON Circle (Black, 600,000-mile threshold over two calendar years). All non-basic Miles & More status levels offer lounge access and executive bonus miles, with the higher levels offering more exclusive benefits.

=== Polonez Lounge ===
The Polonez Lounge is located in the Schengen Zone of Warsaw Chopin Airport. The lounge is accessible to anyone with a business class ticket for travel with LOT or any other Star Alliance member airline, and those who have Star Alliance Gold status with a member airline (such as Miles & More Senator status) or the Polish State Airports authority's 'Good Start' program.

=== Mazurek Lounge ===
The Mazurek Lounge is located in the Non-Schengen Zone on the ground floor of the Warsaw Chopin Airport and offers unique views of the apron.

=== LOT Business Lounge in Chicago ===
LOT operates the Business Lounge at Chicago's O'Hare International Airport's Terminal 5. This is LOT's only lounge outside of Poland.

== Incidents and accidents ==
=== Fatal ===
- On 1 December 1936, a LOT Lockheed Model 10 Electra (registered SP-AYB) hit a tree near Malakasa in Greece due to fog; a pilot was killed; six people were injured.
- On 28 December 1936, a LOT Lockheed Model 10 Electra (registered SP-AYA) crashed near Susiec in Poland due to icing; two passengers and a mechanic died; three people were injured.
- On 11 November 1937, a LOT Lockheed Model 10 Electra (registered SP-AYD) crashed near Warsaw during its landing approach in bad weather, causing the death of four passengers.
- On 23 November 1937, a LOT Douglas DC-2-115D (registered SP-ASJ) crashed in Bulgaria's Pirin Mountains in bad weather, killing all six on board. The aircraft was operating a scheduled Thessaloniki-Sofia passenger service.
- On 22 July 1938 at 17:38 local time, a LOT Lockheed 14H Super Electra (registered SP-BNG) crashed into a hill at Negrilesa, near Stulpicani, Romania, killing all 14 on board; the cause of the crash was unknown, but the aircraft was probably struck by lightning. The aircraft was operating a scheduled Warsaw-Lwów (now Lviv)-Czerniowce (now Chernovtsy)-Bucharest-Thessaloniki passenger service.
- On 15 November 1951 at approximately 09:00 local time, a LOT Lisunov Li-2 (registered SP-LKA) crashed near Tuszyn in bad weather and low visibility conditions, killing all 15 passengers and three crew on board. The aircraft had been on a scheduled flight from Łódź to Kraków.
- One passenger died on 19 March 1954, when a LOT Lisunov Li-2 (registered SP-LAH) collided with a hill near Gruszowiec following the blackout of a radio navigation beacon.
- On 14 June 1957 at 23:10 local time, Flight 232 from Warsaw to Moscow, which was operated by an Ilyushin Il-14 (registered SP-LNF) crashed on approach to Moscow's Vnukovo International Airport in bad weather conditions, killing five of the eight passengers and four of the five crew members.
- On 25 August 1960, a LOT Lisunov Li-2 (registered SP-LAL), crashed near Tczew while on a survey flight over the Vistula River floods, killing six.
- On 19 December 1962, a LOT Vickers Viscount 804 (registered SP-LVB) crashed while on approach to Warsaw-Okecie Airport having encountered a stall, killing all 28 passengers and five crew members on board. The aircraft had been on a scheduled flight from Brussels to Warsaw with an intermediate stop in East Berlin.
- On 20 August 1965 at 13:08 UTC, another LOT Vickers Viscount (registered SP-LVA) crashed near Jeuk, Belgium, during a thunderstorm on a ferry flight from Lille to Wrocław. The aircraft's four occupants were killed.
- On 2 April 1969 at 16:08 local time, a LOT Antonov An-24 (registered SP-LTF), crashed into Polica, a mountain near Zawoja. The aircraft with 48 passengers and five crew on board had been operating Flight 165 from Warsaw to Kraków when the pilots lost orientation in a snowstorm. There were no survivors.
- On 13 May 1977, a LOT Antonov An-12 (registered SP-LZA) operating a cargo flight as Flight 6883 from Warsaw to Beirut via Varna crashed at approximately 08:45 local time near Aramoun, Lebanon, killing all nine people on board, some of whom were agents of the communist Polish secret service. The aircraft had been approaching Beirut International Airport, and the pilots had encountered language difficulties when communicating with the local air traffic controllers. The aircraft was owned by the Polish Air Force and flown by military pilots. It had previously transported weapons for the Lebanese Civil War. When it crashed it was carrying veal.
- On 14 March 1980 at around 11:00 local time, Flight 007 from New York City to Warsaw crashed during a landing attempt at Warsaw-Okecie Airport, killing all 77 passengers and 10 crew members on board the Ilyushin Il-62 (registration SP-LAA), including singer Anna Jantar. The pilots had encountered a landing gear problem and began the standard go-around procedure, during which a shaft in the no. 2 engine disintegrated, damaging the rudder and elevator control lines, and causing the aircraft to enter an uncontrolled dive.
- On 26 March 1981, a LOT An-24 (registered SP-LTU) operating Flight 691 crash-landed near Słupsk after the crew lost situational awareness during a non-precision twin locator approach, killing one passenger. The other 46 passengers and four crew survived, leaving the aircraft through a breach in the fuselage. The fatality was a passenger whose legs were trapped under broken seats and who died in the post-crash fire.
- On 9 May 1987 at 11:12 local time, Flight 5055, bound from Warsaw to New York, crashed in the Kabaty forest about 5km from Warsaw-Okęcie Airport, killing all 172 passengers and 11 crew, making it the deadliest accident in the history of the airline and the country. The aircraft involved was another Ilyushin Il-62 (registration SP-LBG) whose number-2 (left-side inner) engine exploded, igniting a fire in the cargo hold and irreparably damaging all but one of the aircraft's control systems. The pilots attempted a return to Warsaw-Okęcie, but lost control of the aircraft before it entered a steep nose-dive due to damage to the elevators.
- On 2 November 1988, Flight 703 had to execute an emergency landing in a field near Rzeszów following a dual engine failure attributed to icing, killing one passenger. The other 24 passengers and four crew on board the An-24 (registered SP-LTD) survived, though most of them received serious injuries. As of 2025, this remains the last fatal crash in Polish commercial aviation. This accident led LOT Polish Airlines to retire the An-24, replacing them with ATR 42s and ATR 72s.

=== Other incidents and accidents ===
- On 18 August 1938, a LOT Lockheed 14H Super Electra (registered SP-BNJ) was destroyed by a fire in Bucharest after one of its tires burst and the left wing struck the ground.
- On 24 July 1940, a LOT Lockheed 14H2 Super Electra (registered SP-BPK) was deliberately crashed at Bucharest; the aircraft was sold to LOT on 20 March 1939 and seized by Romania on 2 September 1939 at the outbreak of World War II.
- On 26 May 1948, a LOT Lisunov Li-2T (registered SP-LBC) was written off near Popowice.
- On 28 March 1950, a LOT Douglas DC-3 (registered SP-LCC) was damaged beyond repair in a crash landing.
- Only one day later, on 29 March 1950, the airline lost another aircraft (a Lisunov Li-2, registration SP-LBA) in a crash.
- On 19 May 1952, a LOT Li-2 (registered SP-LBD) was damaged beyond repair in a crash landing near Sowina.
- On 18 July of the same year, an Ilyushin Il-12 (registered SP-LHC) was written off in crash landing at Warsaw-Okecie Airport.
- On 15 March 1953, a LOT Douglas DC-3 (registered SP-LCH) crashed near Katowice.
- On 14 April 1955, a Lisunov Li-2 (SP-LAE) crashed near Katowice, with none of the 15 persons on board being killed.
- On 11 April 1958, a LOT Convair CV-240 (registered SP-LPB) crash-landed near Warsaw and was damaged beyond repair after it had lost one propeller in mid-flight. There were only four people on board who had operated a training flight with the aircraft; all of them survived.
- On 16 December 1963, a Lisunov Li-2T (registered SP-LBG) was damaged beyond repair when it overshot the runway on landing at Warsaw-Okecie Airport. The twelve passengers and three crew on board survived.
- On 24 January 1969 at 17:30 local time, a LOT Antonov An-24 (registered SP-LTE) collided with trees during a landing attempt at Wrocław in poor visibility conditions, and crashed. The aircraft had been operating Flight 149 from Warsaw with 44 passengers and four crew members on board, all of whom survived.
- On 19 April 1973, an Antonov An-24 (registered SP-LTN) crashed during a training flight near Rzeszów.
- On 23 January 1980, a Tupolev Tu-134 (registered SP-LGB) was damaged beyond repair when it overshot the runway on landing at Warsaw-Okecie Airport and erupted in flames.
- On 31 December 1993 at 10:20 local time, a Boeing 767-300ER (registered SP-LPA) operating Flight 2 from Chicago to Warsaw received substantial damage to its nose gear in a hard landing incident at Warsaw Chopin Airport.
- On 1 November 2011 a Boeing 767-300ER (registered SP-LPC) operating Flight 16 from Newark Liberty International Airport to Warsaw Chopin Airport reported a failure of the hydraulic system that operated the flaps and landing gear. When the backup system was activated, only the flaps were operable. All attempts to lower the landing gear failed, including one last attempt using gravity; forcing a gear-up landing on runway 33 at Warsaw Chopin. The aircraft, captained by Tadeusz Wrona, made a successful gear-up landing with no injuries or fatalities. The aircraft was written off, and runway 15/33 at Warsaw Chopin Airport was shut for some time to repair the surface damage sustained.
- On 10 January 2018 a Bombardier Dash 8 Q400 (SP-EQG) operating as LO3924 from Krakow to Warsaw reported landing gear issues. Warsaw Chopin Airport was shut down for four hours after an emergency landing there around 19:30 local time with a failed nose gear. There were no reported injuries to the 59 passengers on board.

=== Communist-era hijacking asylum attempts ===
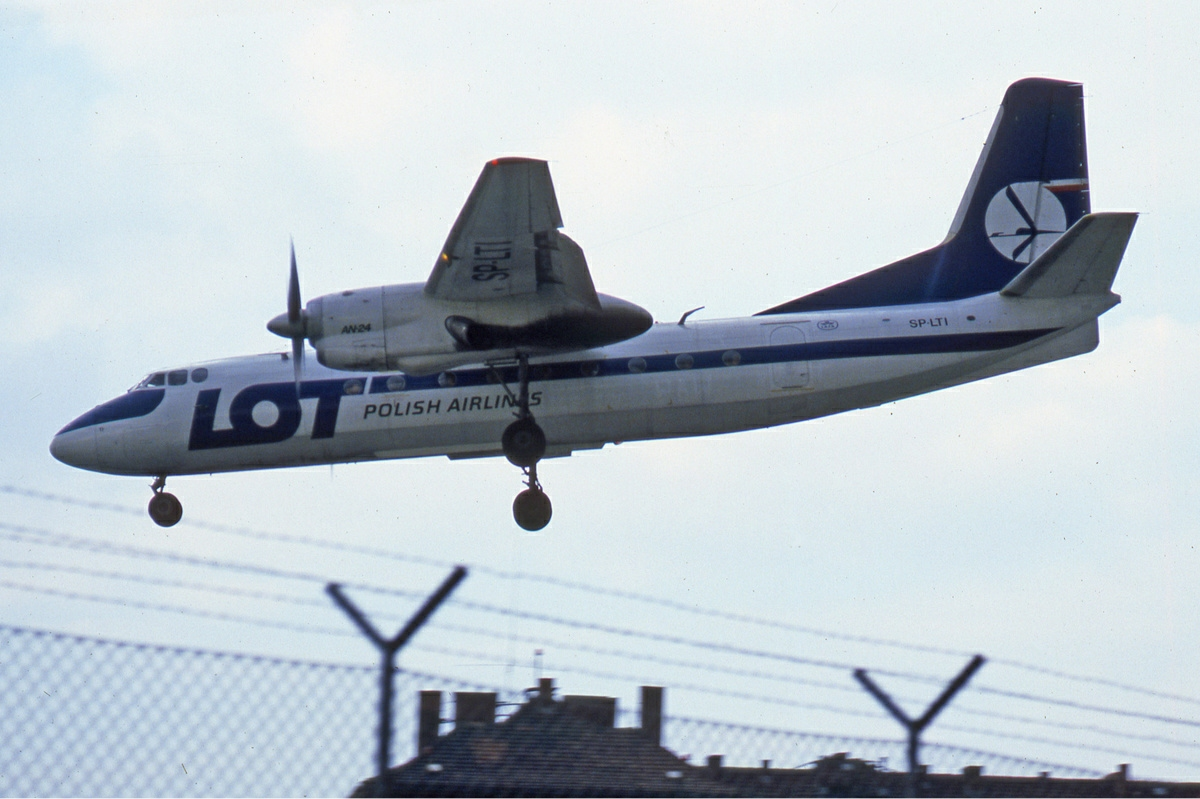
The An-24 aircraft, known as Flight 702, was hijacked and forced to land at Berlin Tempelhof Airport on 21 July 1981. The incident also inspired the episode 18 of the popular Polish crime series "07 Come In," produced by Telewizja Polska

During the Cold War, when Europe was divided by the Iron Curtain, several LOT aircraft were hijacked and forced to land in Western countries, predominantly in West Germany and especially in West Berlin, due to its proximity. The hijackers were usually not prosecuted there but could claim political asylum, along with all other passengers who wished to do so.

- On 16 September 1949, five armed people forced a LOT flight from Gdańsk to Łódź to divert to Nyköping in Sweden.
- On 16 December of the same year, another aircraft on the same route was hijacked, this time it diverted to Bornholm Airport in Denmark. Of the 15 passengers and three crew members on board, 16 decided to claim political asylum.
- On 16 October 1969, a LOT Antonov An-24 (registered SP-LTK) was hijacked by two passengers en route a flight from Warsaw to East Berlin and forced to divert to Berlin Tegel Airport, serving West Berlin.
- Another hijacking of a LOT An-24 occurred on 20 November of the same year, this time on a flight from Wrocław to Bratislava, when two passengers forced the pilots to land at Vienna International Airport.
- On 5 June 1970, a LOT An-24 with 24 people on board was hijacked during a flight from Szczecin to Gdańsk and forced to land at Copenhagen Airport in Denmark, where police forces stormed the aircraft and arrested the perpetrator.
- On 9 June 1970, another hijacking attempt occurred on a LOT flight from Katowice to Warsaw, but the two persons involved were overpowered.
- On 7 August 1970, one passenger on board a LOT An-24 flying from Szczecin to Katowice forced the pilots to divert to Germany. As he did not specify his demands any further, the aircraft landed at Berlin Schönefeld Airport in East Germany, where he was arrested.
- On 19 August 1970, five passengers on board a LOT Ilyushin Il-14 en route a scheduled flight from Gdańsk to Warsaw forced the pilots to divert to Bornholm Airport in Denmark.
- On 26 August 1970, three persons on board a LOT An-24 on a flight from Katowice to Warsaw demanded to be taken to Austria. The pilots returned the aircraft to Katowice Airport instead, where the perpetrators were arrested.
- On 4 November 1976, a LOT Tupolev Tu-134 (registered SP-LHD) was forced by two passengers to leave its scheduled route from Copenhagen to Warsaw and land at Vienna International Airport, where they surrendered to local police forces.
- On 24 April 1977 another LOT Tu-134 (registered SP-LGA) was hijacked, this time on a flight from Kraków to Nuremberg in West Germany. The pilots returned to Kraków-Balice Airport, where the aircraft was stormed and the hijacker arrested.
- Another hijacking attempt was suppressed on 18 October 1977 on board a LOT An-24 (registered SP-LTH) en route from Katowice to Warsaw.
- On 30 August 1978, Flight 165 en route from Gdańsk to East Berlin was hijacked by two East German citizens who forced the pilots to land the Tu-134 involved (registered SP-LGC) at Berlin Tempelhof Airport in West Berlin. Apart from the hijackers, another six people decided to claim political asylum, thus making it one of the largest successful escapes over the Berlin Wall.
- On 4 December 1980, a LOT An-24 (registered SP-LTB) was hijacked during a flight from Zielona Góra to Warsaw and forced to land at Berlin-Tegel Airport.
- SP-LTB was involved in another hijacking attempt on 10 January 1981, when four passengers demanded to be taken to a Western country during a flight from Katowice to Warsaw. This time, however, the pilots continued to Warsaw-Okęcie Airport where the perpetrators were arrested.
- An Antonov An-24 (registered SP-LTI) was forced to land at Tempelhof Airport in West Berlin on 21 July 1981, having been hijacked during a flight from Katowice to Gdańsk.
- On 5 August 1981, another hijacking attempt occurred on board SP-LTI while it was flying from Katowice to Gdańsk, but the perpetrator was restrained and arrested upon landing at Gdańsk Airport.
- On 11 August, another hijacking attempt on the Katowice to Gdańsk route was foiled, again on an Antonov An-24 (registered SP-LTT). Along with the aircraft bearing registration number SP-LTI, the plane was used as a setting for episode 18 of the Polish crime series "07 Come In".
- On 22 August 1981, a hijacker succeeded in his demands that the aircraft involved (an An-24 registered SP-LTC as Flight 702) be diverted to West Berlin's Tegel Airport from its original route from Wrocław to Warsaw.
- On 18 September 1981 twelve passengers rioted on board an An-24 (registered SP-LTG) on a flight from Katowice to Warsaw and demanded the aircraft be diverted to West Berlin. A Mil Mi-8 helicopter of the Soviet military attempted to intercept the aircraft before landing at Tegel Airport, but failed to do so.
- On 22 September four passengers tried to hijack a LOT flight from Warsaw to Koszalin, but the pilots returned the An-24 (registered SP-LTK) to Warsaw-Okęcie Airport instead, where the perpetrators were arrested.
- A week later on 29 September 1981, one hijacker demanded an Antonov An-12 (registered SP-LTP) on a flight from Warsaw to Szczecin be diverted to West Berlin; again the pilots landed the aircraft in Warsaw.
- On 30 April 1982, eight passengers forced a LOT An-24 (registered SP-LTG), that was operating a flight from Wrocław to Warsaw, to divert to Berlin-Tegel Airport.
- On 9 June 1982, two hijackers on board a LOT flight from Katowice to Warsaw demanded the pilots to divert to West Germany. Instead, the aircraft landed in Poland and the perpetrators were arrested.
- On 25 August 1982, two passengers a flight from Budapest to Warsaw, that was operated using an Ilyushin Il-18 (registered SP-LSI), to divert to Munich Riem Airport.
- On 22 November 1982 a flight from Wrocław to Warsaw (operated by an An-24 registered SP-LTK) was forced to land at Berlin-Tempelhof Airport.

=== Other ===
- On 25 February 1993, a man forced his way into a LOT ATR 72 (registered SP-LFA) at Rzeszów-Jasionka Airport during the boarding process for Flight 702 to Warsaw, threatening to detonate a hand grenade. Polish special forces stormed the aircraft in which there were 30 people at the time. The perpetrator (who proved to be unarmed) was shot at and overpowered.
- On 26 November 2025, Vilnius Airport was closed after LOT Flight 771, landing from Warsaw Chopin Airport veered off the taxiway after touchdown.

== See also ==
- Transport in Poland
- List of airlines
- LOT Charters
- Nordica (airline)

== Bibliography ==
- Endres, Günter G. (January 1973). "Airline History No. 29: LOT—Polish Airlines". Air Pictorial. Vol. 35, no. 1. pp. 22–28.
- Jońca, Adam (1985). Samoloty linii lotniczych 1919–1930 [Aircraft of airlines 1919–1930]. Barwa w lotnictwie polskim (in Polish). Vol. 2. Warsaw: Wydawnictwa Komunikacji i Łączności. ISBN 83-206-0485-0.
- —————— (1985). Samoloty linii lotniczych 1931–1939 [Aircraft of airlines 1931–1939]. Barwa w lotnictwie polskim (in Polish). Vol. 3. Warsaw: Wydawnictwa Komunikacji i Łączności. ISBN 83-206-0504-0.
- —————— (1985). Samoloty linii lotniczych 1945–1956 [Aircraft of airlines 1945–1956]. Barwa w lotnictwie polskim (in Polish). Vol. 4. Warsaw: Wydawnictwa Komunikacji i Łączności. ISBN 83-206-0529-6.
- —————— (1986). Samoloty linii lotniczych 1957–1981 [Aircraft of airlines 1957–1981]. Barwa w lotnictwie polskim (in Polish). Vol. 5. Warsaw: Wydawnictwa Komunikacji i Łączności. ISBN 83-206-0530-X.
- Mazur, Wojciech (2016). Samoloty komunikacyjne PLL LOT. Wielki leksykon uzbrojenia. Wrzesień 1939 (in Polish). Vol. tom 81. Warsaw: Edipresse Polska. ISBN 978-83-7945-055-8.
- Mols, Jozef (2023). LOT Polish Airlines: Wings of Central Europe. Airlines Series, Vol. 7. Stamford, Lincs, UK: Key Publishing. ISBN 9781802822601.
