= Eurolot =

Polish regional airline

IATA	ICAO	Call sign
K2	ELO	EUROLOT
- Founded: 1996
- Ceased operations: 2015
- Hubs: John Paul II International Airport Kraków-Balice; Gdańsk Lech Wałęsa Airport; Warsaw Chopin Airport
- Fleet size: 14
- Destinations: 20
- Parent company: State Treasury of Poland (62.1%); Towarzystwo Finansowe Silesia (37.9%)
- Headquarters: Warsaw, Poland
- Key people: Mariusz Dąbrowski (CEO); Bartłomiej Matusewicz (Vice President)
- Website: eurolot.com

Eurolot S.A. (previously styled as EuroLOT) was a Polish regional airline based in Warsaw. Apart from its own flights under the eurolot.com brand, it operated short-haul flights for LOT Polish Airlines, as well as ad hoc charter flights. Its main base was Warsaw Frederic Chopin Airport (when operating for LOT), whilst its own flights centre on its hubs at John Paul II Kraków Airport and Gdańsk Lech Wałęsa Airport. The airline had its head office in the LOT Polish Airlines headquarters in Warsaw. Eurolot ended operations on 31 March 2015. The company slogan was Polish: Zawsze z klasą, Always classy.

== History ==
=== Early years ===
EuroLOT was established on 19 December 1996 and commenced regular air operations on 1 July 1997. Initially, EuroLOT operated as an air carrier with its own network of connections. At that time EuroLOT's fleet was made up of turboprop aircraft: 5 owned ATR 42-30018-seat BAe Jetstream 31 aircraft. The primary task of EuroLOT was to reconstruct the network of domestic and regional flights while reducing operational costs and to create new value in the field of domestic air transport.

In 2000 the company ceased to be an independent carrier and became an operator. In the same year, EuroLOT took over all ATR aircraft from LOT. In 2002 EuroLOT began to modernize its fleet by replacing ATR 42-300 with newer ATR 42-500. As of March 2007, it had 278 employees.

=== Later development ===
Established as a wholly owned subsidiary of LOT Polish Airlines, its current main shareholder is the State Treasury with 62.1% of shares, while Towarzystwo Finansowe Silesia is the minority shareholder with 37.9% shares. During the 2011 summer season, after the State Treasury acquired the majority of its shares, the airline started flying Polish regional routes under the eurolot.com brand, in addition to operating flights for LOT. Starting in December 2011, Eurolot introduced flights from Gdańsk and Warsaw to Poprad, Slovakia in addition to expanding rapidly in the domestic market.

In 2012, Eurolot placed an order for 8 Bombardier Dash 8 Q400 NextGen turboprop aircraft to replace the old ATR fleet. In 2014 Eurolot considered the wet-lease of a LOT Boeing 787 Dreamliner for services to South East Asia as part of a larger LOT restructuring. However, this plan did not materialise.

On 6 February 2015, it was announced that the company would be liquidated due to financial problems and end operations on 31 March 2015. LOT Polish Airlines assumed some of Eurolot's routes, re-leasing former Eurolot aircraft.

== Codeshare agreements ==
Eurolot had codeshare agreements with the following airlines as of July 2014:

- LOT Polish Airlines

== Destinations ==
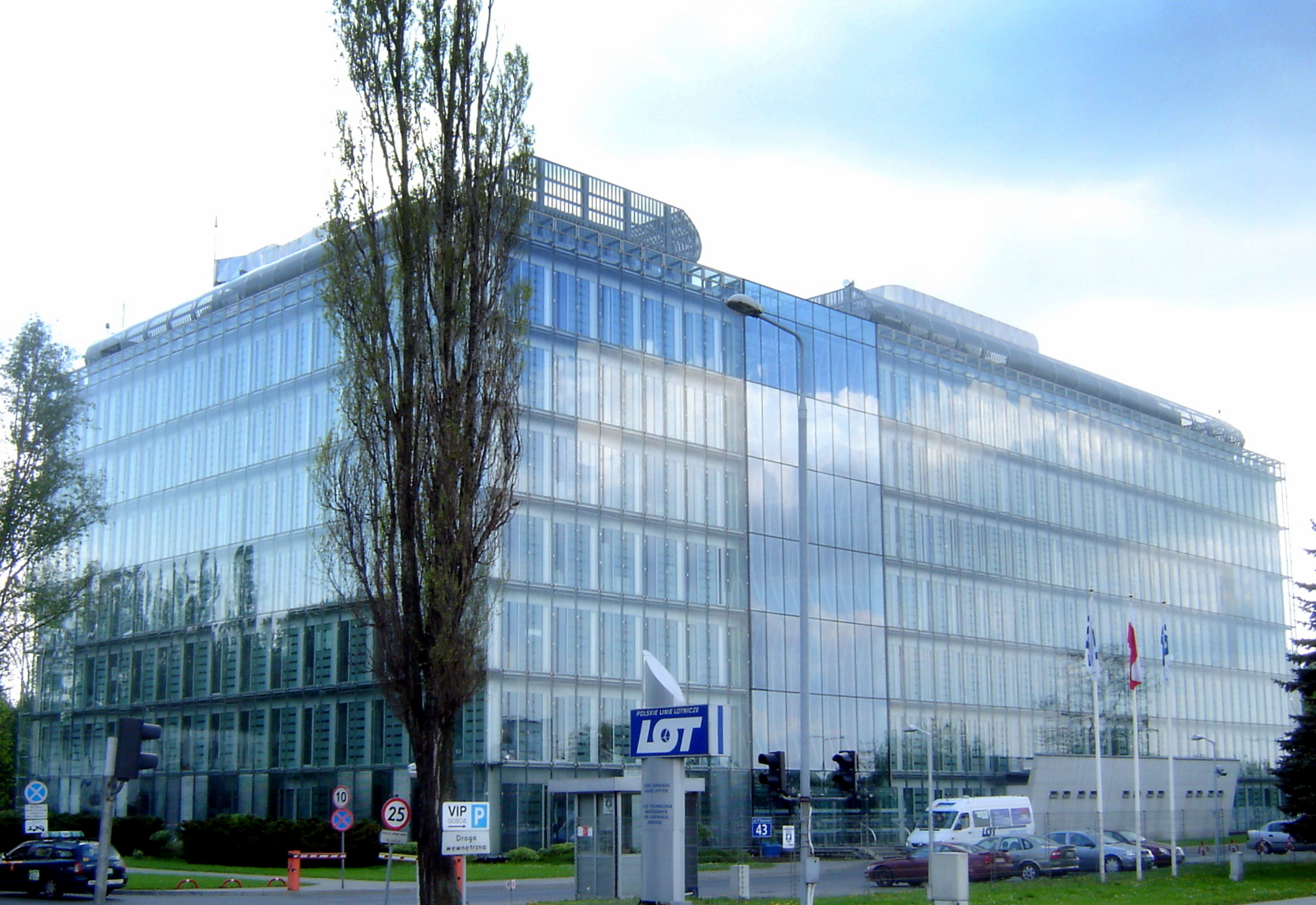
The head office of LOT Polish Airlines, where Eurolot had its head office as well

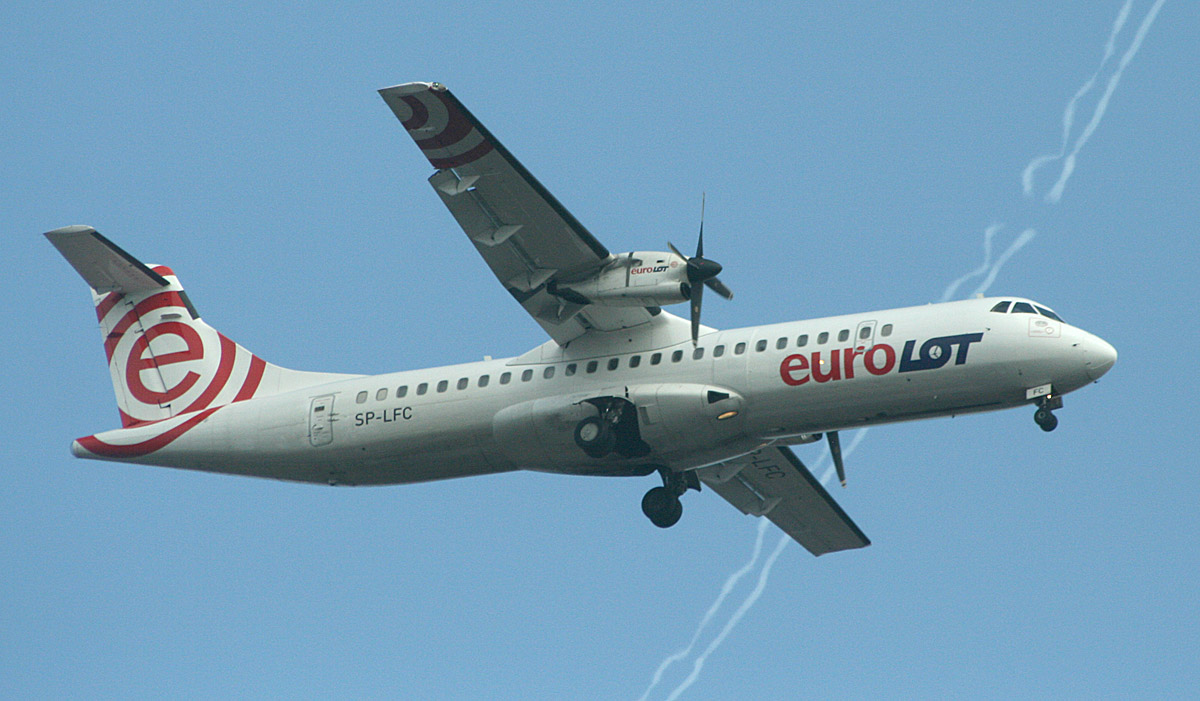
A former Eurolot ATR 72-202

Eurolot served the following destinations as of September 2014:

†	Hub
*	Operated by Eurolot for LOT Polish Airlines
*	Served by Eurolot and LOT Polish Airlines

City	Country	IATA	ICAO	Airport	Ref	Commenced	End
Amsterdam	Netherlands	AMS	EHAM	Amsterdam Airport Schiphol ^{*}		-	31 March 2015
Beauvais	France	BVA	LFOB	Beauvais–Tillé Airport ^{*}		September 2013	31 March 2015
Brussels	Belgium	BRU	EBBR	Brussels Airport ^{*}		April 2014	31 March 2015
Bydgoszcz	Poland	BZG	EPBY	Bydgoszcz Ignacy Jan Paderewski Airport			31 March 2015
Chișinău	Moldova	KIV	LUKK	Chișinău International Airport ^{*}		26 October 2014	31 March 2015
Dubrovnik	Croatia	DBV	LDDU	Dubrovnik Airport ^{*}		-	31 March 2015
Düsseldorf	Germany	DUS	EDDL	Düsseldorf Airport ^{*}		26 October 2014	31 March 2015
Frankfurt	Germany	FRA	EDDF	Frankfurt Airport ^{*}		-	31 March 2015
Gdańsk	Poland	GDN	EPGD	Gdańsk Lech Wałęsa Airport ^{† *}		-	31 March 2015
Helsinki	Finland	HEL	EFHK	Helsinki Airport		-	31 March 2015
Heringsdorf	Germany	HDF	EDAH	Heringsdorf Airport ^{*}		-	31 March 2015
Katowice	Poland	KTW	EPKT	Katowice International Airport ^{*}		-	31 March 2015
Kraków	Poland	KRK	EPKK	John Paul II International Airport Kraków-Balice ^{† *}		-	31 March 2015
Lublin	Poland	LUZ	EPLB	Lublin Airport ^{*}		-	31 March 2015
Milan	Italy	MXP	LIMC	Malpensa Airport ^{*}		28 February 2014	31 March 2015
Munich	Germany	MUC	EDDM	Munich Airport ^{*}		-	31 March 2015
Paris	France	CDG	LFPG	Charles de Gaulle Airport ^{*}		-	31 March 2015
Poznań	Poland	POZ	EPPO	Poznań-Ławica Airport ^{*}		-	31 March 2015
Riga	Latvia	RIX	EVRA	Riga International Airport ^{*}		-	31 March 2015
Rome	Italy	FCO	LIRF	Leonardo da Vinci–Fiumicino Airport ^{*}		09/2013	31 March 2015
Rzeszów	Poland	RZE	EPRZ	Rzeszów-Jasionka Airport ^{*}		-	31 March 2015
Salzburg	Austria	SZG	LOWS	Salzburg Airport ^{*}		-	31 March 2015
Split	Croatia	SPU	LDSP	Split Airport ^{*}		-	31 March 2015
Stuttgart	Germany	STR	EDDS	Stuttgart Airport ^{*}		26 October 2014	31 March 2015
Szczecin	Poland	SZZ	EPSC	Szczecin-Goleniów "Solidarność" Airport ^{*}		-	31 March 2015
Tallinn	Estonia	TLL	EETN	Tallinn Airport ^{*}		-	31 March 2015
Vienna	Austria	VIE	LOWW	Vienna International Airport ^{*}		-	31 March 2015
Vilnius	Lithuania	VNO	EYVI	Vilnius International Airport ^{*}		-	31 March 2015
Warsaw	Poland	WAW	EPWA	Warsaw Frédéric Chopin Airport ^{*}		1997	31 March 2015
Wrocław	Poland	WRO	EPWR	Wrocław Airport ^{*}		-	31 March 2015
Zadar	Croatia	ZAD	LDZD	Zadar Airport ^{*}		-	31 March 2015
Zagreb	Croatia	ZAG	LDZA	Zagreb Airport ^{*}		26 October 2014	31 March 2015
Zürich	Switzerland	ZRH	LSZH	Zürich Airport ^{*}		-	31 March 2015

== Fleet ==
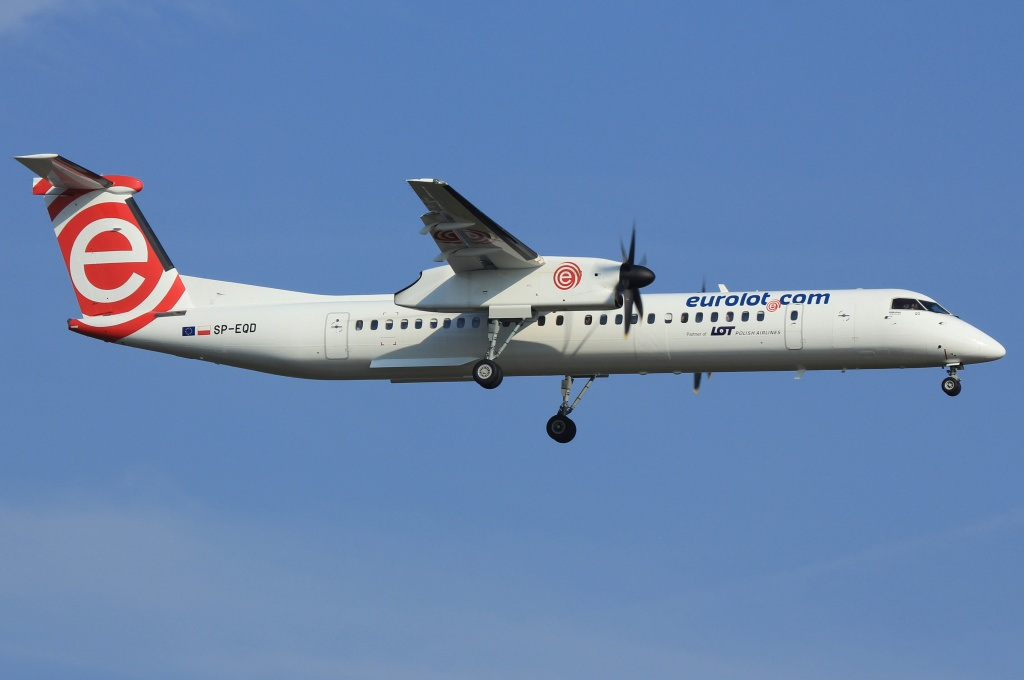
A Eurolot Bombardier Q400

As of November 2014, the Eurolot fleet consisted of the following aircraft:

Aircraft	In service	Orders	Options	Passengers	Notes
Bombardier Q400	11	3	6	78	6 served LOT routes. Were transferred to LOT. 6 out of 12 options were converted into firm orders
