= Zdzisław (given name) =

Polish male given name

- Pronunciation: Polish: [ˈzd͡ʑiswaf]
- Gender: male
- Language: Polish

Origin
- Origin: Slavic
- Meaning: zdzi / zde ("to do, make") + slava ("glory, fame")
- Region of origin: Poland

Other names
- Variant form: Zdzisława (f)
- Related names: Zdeslav, Zdenko

Zdzisław (Polish: [ˈzd͡ʑiswaf]) is a Polish masculine given name. It is derived from the two parts zdzie / zde (from Slavic deti) - "to do, make", and sław / slava - "glory, fame".

The female form of the name is Zdzisława (Polish: [zd͡ʑiˈswava]).

== List of people with the name ==
=== A-J ===
- Zdzisław I (died c. 1180s), Polish archbishop
- Zdzisław Ambroziak (1944–2004), Polish volleyball player and sports commentator
- Zdzisław Antczak (1947–2019), Polish handball player
- Zdzisław Antolski (1953–2023), Polish poet
- Zdzisław Beksiński (1929–2005), Polish painter
- Zdzisław Belsitzmann (ca. 1890–1920), Polish chess player
- Zdzisław Bieniek (1930–2017), Polish footballer
- Zdzisław Birnbaum (1878–1921), Polish violinist and conductor
- Zdzisław Bradel (1950–2020), Polish politician, poet and journalist
- Zdzisław Bromek (born 1945), retired Polish rower
- Zdzisław Broński (1912–1949), Polish army officer
- Zdzisław Bubnicki (1938–2006), Polish scientist
- Zdzisław Chmielewski (born 1942), Polish historian and university rector
- Zdzisław Celiński (1847–1929), Polish engineer
- Zdzisław Dobrucki (1944–2021), Polish speedway rider
- Zdzisław Dziadulski (1896–1940), Polish equestrian
- Zdzisław Filipkiewicz (1916–1983), Polish basketball player
- Zdzisław Gierwatowski (1920–2005), Polish football player and coach
- Zdzisław Goliński (1908–1963), Polish Roman Catholic bishop
- Zdzisław Harlender (1898–1939), Polish pilot, army officer and writer
- Zdzisław Henneberg (1911–1941), Polish fighter pilot
- Zdzisław Hoffmann (born 1959), Polish triple jumper
- Zdzisław Jachimecki (1882–1953), Polish composer and historian of music
- Zdzisław Janik (born 1964), Polish footballer
- Zdzisław Jasiński (1863–1932), Polish painter

=== K-R ===
- Zdzisław Kaczmarczyk (1911–1980), Polish historian
- Zdzisław Kapka (born 1954), Polish footballer
- Zdzisław Karczewski (1903–1970), Polish film actor
- Zdzisław Karos (died 1982), Polish sergeant
- Zdzisław Kasprzak (1910–1971), Polish basketball player
- Zdzisław Kawecki (1902–1940), Polish horse rider
- Zdzisław Konieczny (1930–2016), Polish historian
- Zdzisław Kostrzewa (1955–1991), Polish footballer
- Zdzisław Kotla (1949–2012), Polish sailor
- Zdzisław Król (1935–2010), Polish Roman Catholic priest
- Zdzisław Krygowski (1872—1955),Polish mathematician and professor
- Zdzisław Krzyszkowiak (1929–2003), Polish steeplechase athlete
- Zdzisław Kumiszcze (1937–1986), Polish hurdler
- Zdzisław Kuźniar (born 1931), Polish theater, film and television actor
- Zdzisław Kwaśny (born 1960), Polish hammer thrower
- Zdzisław Lesiński (1921–2000), Polish gymnast
- Zdzisław Lubomirski (1865–1943), Polish aristocrat, landowner, and politician
- Zdzisław Łukaszkiewicz, Polish judge
- Zdzisław Maklakiewicz (1927–1977), Polish actor
- Zdzisław Michalski (1928–1985), Polish rower
- Zdzisław Mordarski (1922–1991), Polish footballer
- Zdzisław Motyka (1907–1969), Polish cross-country skier
- Zdzisław Mrożewski (1909–2002), Polish actor
- Zdzisław Myrda (1951–2020), Polish basketball player
- Zdzisław Najder (1930–2021), Polish literary historian, critic, and political activist
- Zdzisław Najmrodzki (1954–1995), Polish thief
- Zdzisław Nowak (1906–1996), Polish athlete
- Zdzisław Nowak (ice hockey), (1928–2000), Polish ice hockey player
- Zdzislaw Pawlak (1926–2006), Polish mathematician and computer scientist
- Zdzisław Peszkowski (1918–2007), Polish Roman Catholic priest
- Zdzisław Pieńkowski, Polish figure skater
- Zdzisław Piernik (born 1937), Polish virtuoso tuba player
- Zdzisław Podedworny (born 1941), Polish football player and manager
- Zdzisław Podkański (1949–2022), Polish politician and Member of the European Parliament
- Zdzisław Pupa (born 1960), Polish politician
- Zdzisław Puszkarz (born 1950), Polish footballer
- Zdzisław Józef Porosiński (1955–2016), Polish mathematician and statistician
- Zdzisław Raczyński (born 1959), Polish diplomat, journalist and novelist
- Zdzisław Jan Ryn (1938–2022), Polish diplomat

=== S-Z ===
- Zdzislaw Sikora (born 1952), German-born American artist
- Zdzisław Siuda, Polish luger
- Zdzisław Skrok (born 1950), Polish archaeologist and writer
- Zdzisław Skrzeczkowski (1930–2024), Polish basketball player
- Zdzisław Skupień (1938–2025), Polish mathematician
- Zdzisław Smoliński (1942–1993), Polish athlete
- Zdzisław Sobora (born 1952), Polish triple jumper
- Zdzisław Sosnowski (1924–2018), Polish footballer
- Zdzisław Spieralski (1927–1983), Polish historian and journalist
- Zdzisław Starzyński (1932–2003), Polish field hockey player
- Zdzisław Staniul (born 1965), Polish sailor
- Zdzisław Stieber (1903–1980), Polish linguist
- Zdzisław Stolarski (born 1948), Polish wrestler
- Zdzisław Strojek (born 1964), Polish footballer
- Zdzisław Styczeń (1894–1978) was a Polish footballer
- Zdzisław Suchodolski (1835–1908), German-Polish painter
- Zdzisław Świderski (born 1940, Polish professor of biology
- Zdzisław Szlapkin (born 1961 in Chodzież, Wielkopolskie), Polish racewalker
- Zdzisław Szubski (born 1958), Polish sprint canoer
- Zdzisław Tomyślak (born 1946), Polish sprint canoer
- Zdzisław Trojanowski (1928–2006), Polish ice hockey winger
- Zdzisław Ulatowski (born 1949), Polish football player and coach
- Zdzisław Wąsik (born 1947), Polish linguist and semiotician
- Zdzislaw Wesołowski (1927–1983), Polish footballer
- Zdzisław Wojdylak (1929–1987), Polish field hockey player
- Zdzisław Wolski (born 1956), doctor and politician
- Zdzisław Wrona (born 1962), Polish former cyclist
- Zdzisław Wysocki (born 1944), Polish composer
- Zdzisław Zamoyski (1810–1855), Polish nobleman and landowner
- Zdzisław Jan Zamoyski (c. 1591–1670), Polish nobleman
- Zdzisław Żurawski (born 1954), Polish Army officer
- Zdzisław Żygulski, Jr. (1921–2015), Polish art historian
- Zdzisław Żygulski, Sr (1888–1975), Polish literary historian and Germanist

=== Zdzisława ===
- Zdzisława Donat (born 1946), Polish soprano
- Zdzisława Janowska (born 1940), Polish economist and politician
- Zdzisława Sośnicka (born 1945), Polish singer

== See also ==
- Zdeslav (disambiguation)
- Zdzisław (disambiguation)
