= Zdzisław Żygulski =

Zdzisław Żygulski may refer to:

- Zdzisław Żygulski (literary historian) (1888–1975), Polish literary historian and Germanist; father of the following
- Zdzisław Żygulski (art historian) (1921–2015), Polish art historian, academic and educator; son of the above
