= Čistá =

Čistá may refer to places in the Czech Republic:

- Čistá (Mladá Boleslav District), a municipality and village in the Central Bohemian Region
- Čistá (Rakovník District), a market town in the Central Bohemian Region
- Čistá (Svitavy District), a municipality and village in the Pardubice Region
- Čistá u Horek, a municipality and village in the Liberec Region
- Čistá v Krkonoších, a village and part of Černý Důl in the Hradec Králové Region
