= Żygulski =

Żygulski is a Polish surname. Notable people with the surname include:

- Kazimierz Żygulski (1919–2012), Polish sociologist, political activist and Minister of Culture
- Zdzisław Żygulski, Jr. (1921–2015), Polish art historian, son of Zdzisław Żygulski, Sr.
- Zdzisław Żygulski, Sr. (1888–1975), Polish literary historian and Germanist
