= Bradel =

Bradel is a surname. Notable people with the surname include:

- Ernst-Joachim Bradel (1909–1994), German Oberst
- P. Jean-Baptiste Bradel (18th century), French engraver
- Walter Bradel (1911–1943), German pilot
- Zdzisław Bradel (born 1950), Polish politician, poet, and journalist
- Hubert Bradel (1920–2002), German horn player

== See also ==
- Bradel binding, a style of bookbinding
