= Podmokle Wielkie =

- Village
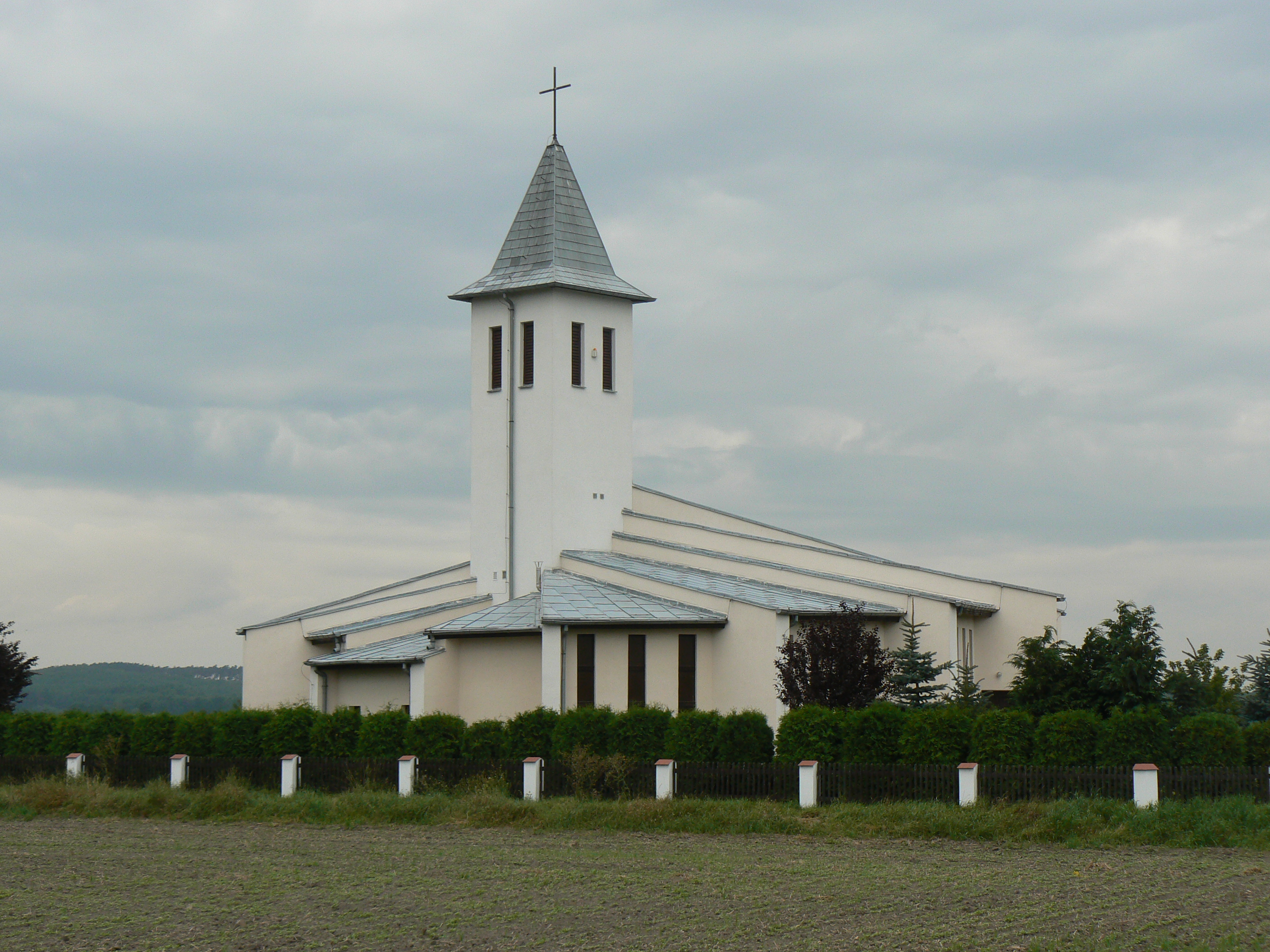
- Saint Joseph church in Podmokle Wielkie

- Location within Poland
- Coordinates: 52°12′N 15°49′E
- Country: Poland
- Voivodeship: Lubusz
- County: Zielona Góra
- Gmina: Babimost
- Time zone: UTC+1 (CET)
  - Summer (DST): UTC+2 (CEST)
- Vehicle registration: FZI
- Primary airport: Zielona Góra Airport

Podmokle Wielkie [pɔdˈmɔklɛ ˈvʲɛlkʲɛ] is a village in the administrative district of Gmina Babimost, within Zielona Góra County, Lubusz Voivodeship, in western Poland.

== History ==
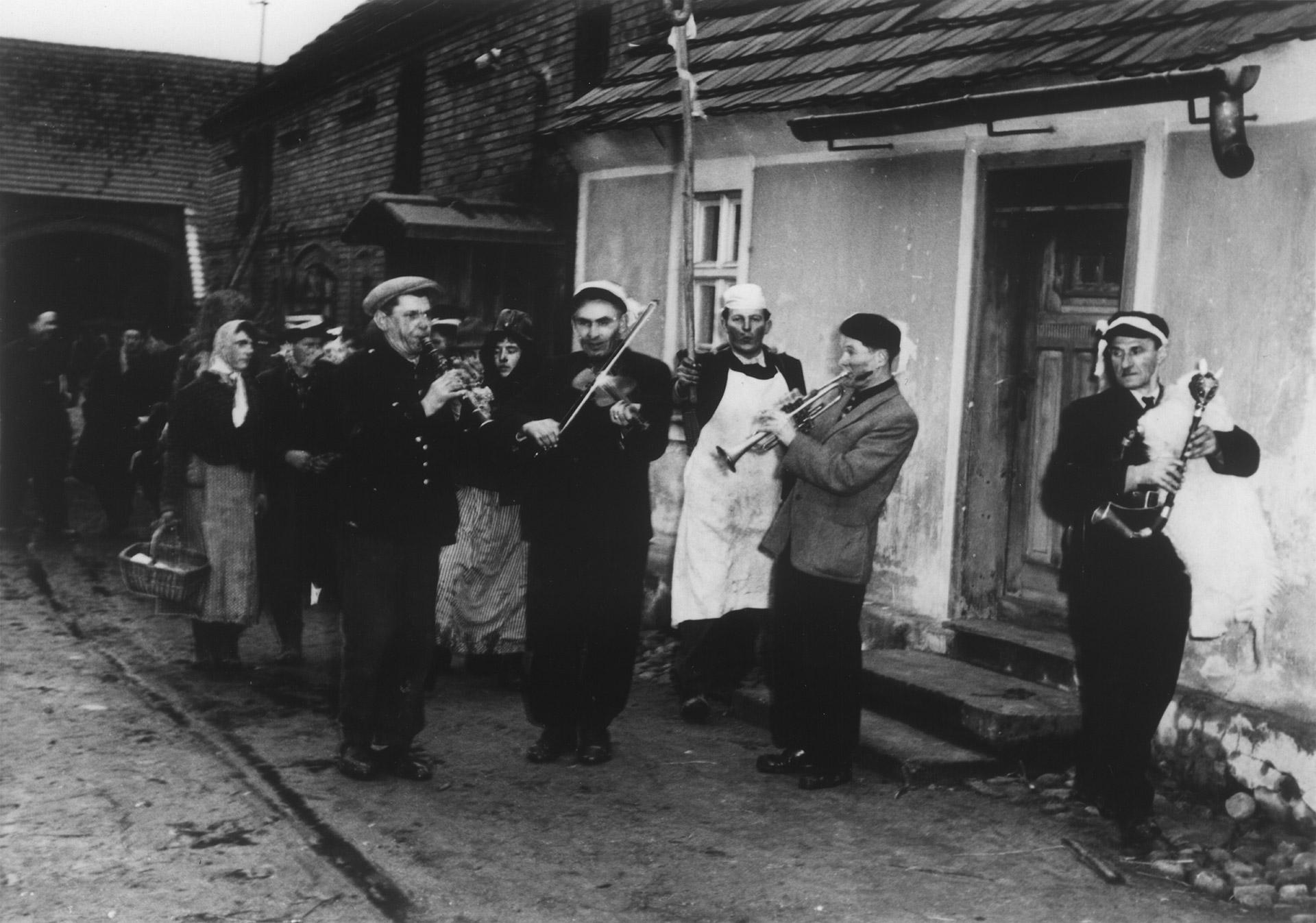
Rural folk fest in 1960

The territory became a part of the emerging Polish state under its first historic ruler Mieszko I in the 10th century. Podmokle Wielkie was a royal village of the Polish Crown, administratively located in the Kościan County in the Poznań Voivodeship in the Greater Poland Province.

During the German invasion of Poland, which started World War II in September 1939, the Germans arrested a local Polish school teacher, who was then deported to the Sachsenhausen concentration camp, and killed there (see Nazi crimes against the Polish nation). Several young Poles, wanting to avoid being drafted into the Wehrmacht and fighting against Poland, fled the village. After the defeat of Nazi Germany in the war, in 1945, the village was restored to Poland.
