= List of LOT Polish Airlines destinations =

List of airline services

This is a list of domestic and international destinations of LOT Polish Airlines.

== Map ==
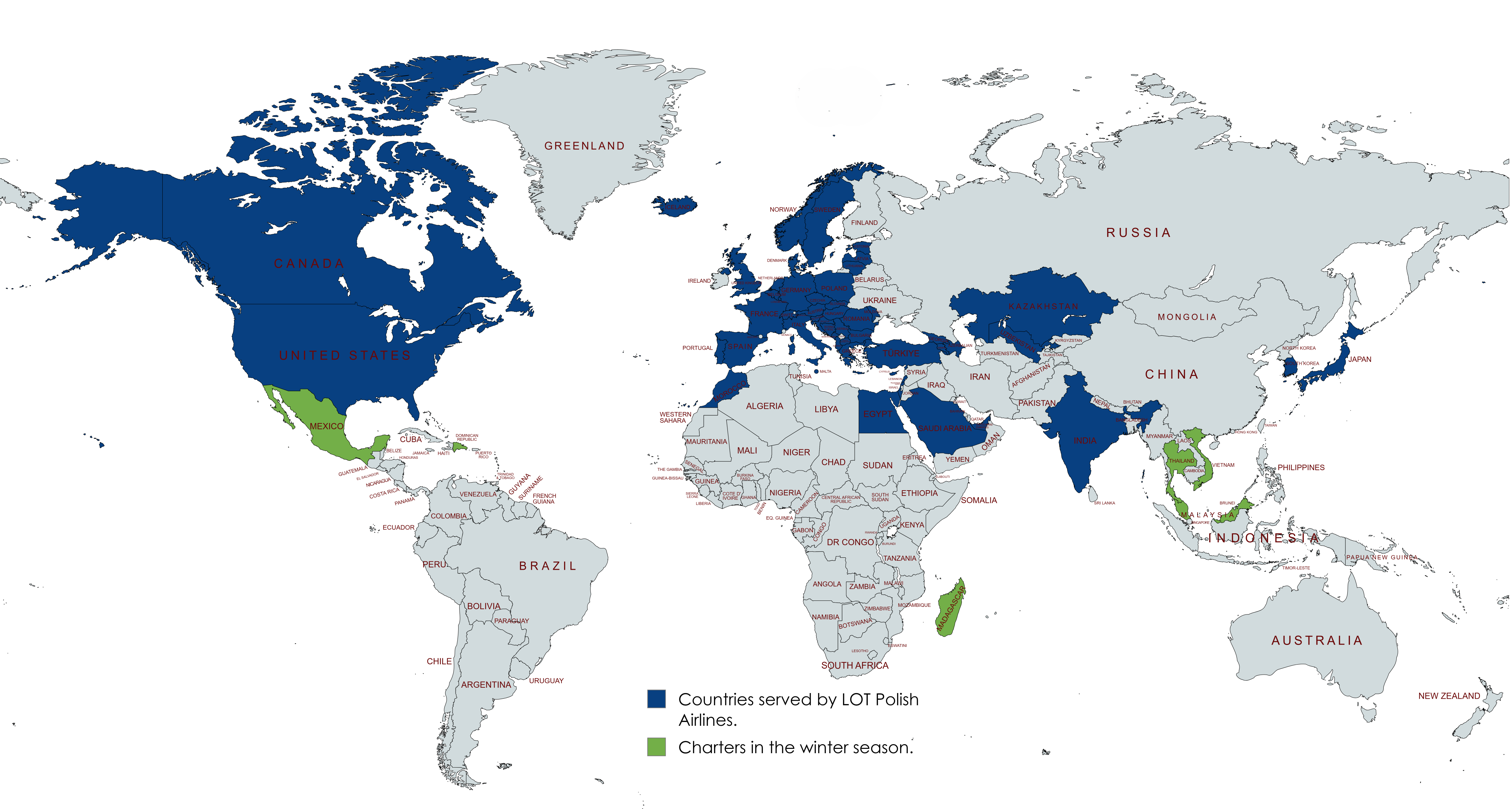

== Destinations ==
Country	City	Airport	Notes	Refs
Albania	Tirana	Tirana International Airport Nënë Tereza		
Armenia	Yerevan	Zvartnots International Airport		
Austria	Innsbruck	Innsbruck Airport	Terminated	
Austria	Vienna	Vienna International Airport		
Azerbaijan	Baku	Heydar Aliyev International Airport		
Belarus	Minsk	Minsk National Airport	Terminated	
Belgium	Brussels	Brussels Airport		
Bosnia and Herzegovina	Sarajevo	Sarajevo International Airport	Seasonal	
Brazil	Rio de Janeiro	Rio de Janeiro/Galeão International Airport	Seasonal charter	
Brazil	Salvador	Salvador Bahia Airport	Seasonal charter	
Bulgaria	Sofia	Vasil Levski Sofia Airport		
Bulgaria	Varna	Varna Airport	Seasonal	
Canada	Toronto	Toronto Pearson International Airport		
China	Beijing	Beijing Capital International Airport	Terminated	
China	Beijing	Beijing Daxing International Airport	Terminated	
China	Tianjin	Tianjin Binhai International Airport	Terminated	
Croatia	Dubrovnik	Dubrovnik Airport		
Croatia	Pula	Pula Airport	Terminated	
Croatia	Split	Split Airport	Seasonal	
Croatia	Zagreb	Zagreb Airport		
Cuba	Varadero	Juan Gualberto Gómez Airport	Seasonal charter	
Cyprus	Larnaca	Larnaca International Airport		
Czech Republic	Ostrava	Leoš Janáček Airport Ostrava		
Czech Republic	Prague	Václav Havel Airport Prague		
Denmark	Billund	Billund Airport		
Denmark	Copenhagen	Copenhagen Airport		
Dominican Republic	Puerto Plata	Gregorio Luperón International Airport	Seasonal charter	
Dominican Republic	Punta Cana	Punta Cana International Airport	Seasonal charter	
Egypt	Cairo	Cairo International Airport		
Egypt	Hurghada	Hurghada International Airport	Seasonal charter	
Egypt	Sharm El Sheikh	Sharm El Sheikh International Airport	Seasonal charter	
Estonia	Tallinn	Tallinn Airport		
Finland	Rovaniemi	Rovaniemi Airport	Seasonal	
France	Lyon	Lyon–Saint-Exupéry Airport		
France	Nice	Nice Côte d'Azur Airport		
France	Paris	Charles de Gaulle Airport		
France	Paris	Orly Airport		
Georgia	Tbilisi	Tbilisi International Airport		
Germany	Berlin	Berlin Brandenburg Airport		
Germany	Düsseldorf	Düsseldorf Airport		
Germany	Frankfurt	Frankfurt Airport		
Germany	Hamburg	Hamburg Airport		
Germany	Munich	Munich Airport		
Germany	Nuremberg	Nuremberg Airport		
Germany	Stuttgart	Stuttgart Airport		
Greece	Athens	Athens International Airport		
Greece	Corfu	Corfu International Airport	Terminated	
Greece	Heraklion	Heraklion International Airport	Seasonal	
Greece	Kos	Kos International Airport	Terminated	
Greece	Preveza	Aktion International Airport	Seasonal	
Greece	Rhodes	Rhodes International Airport	Terminated	
Greece	Thessaloniki	Thessaloniki Airport		
Hungary	Budapest	Budapest Ferenc Liszt International Airport		
Iceland	Reykjavík	Keflavík International Airport		
India	Delhi	Indira Gandhi International Airport		
India	Goa	Dabolim Airport	Seasonal charter	
India	Mumbai	Chhatrapati Shivaji Maharaj International Airport	Terminated	
Indonesia	Denpasar	Ngurah Rai International Airport	Seasonal charter	
Iran	Tehran	Tehran Imam Khomeini International Airport	Terminated	
Ireland	Dublin	Dublin Airport		
Israel	Tel Aviv	Ben Gurion Airport		
Italy	Bologna	Bologna Guglielmo Marconi Airport		
Italy	Milan	Milan Malpensa Airport		
Italy	Rimini	Federico Fellini International Airport	Seasonal	
Italy	Rome	Leonardo da Vinci–Fiumicino Airport		
Italy	Venice	Venice Marco Polo Airport		
Japan	Tokyo	Narita International Airport		
Kazakhstan	Almaty	Almaty International Airport		
Kazakhstan	Astana	Nursultan Nazarbayev International Airport		
Kenya	Mombasa	Moi International Airport	Seasonal charter	
Latvia	Riga	Riga International Airport		
Lebanon	Beirut	Beirut–Rafic Hariri International Airport		
Lithuania	Kaunas	Kaunas Airport		
Lithuania	Palanga	Palanga International Airport	Seasonal	
Lithuania	Vilnius	Vilnius Čiurlionis International Airport		
Luxembourg	Luxembourg City	Luxembourg Airport		
Malta	Valletta	Malta International Airport		
Mauritius	Port Louis	Sir Seewoosagur Ramgoolam International Airport	Seasonal charter	
Mexico	Cancún	Cancún International Airport	Charter	
Moldova	Chișinău	Chișinău Eugen Doga International Airport		
Montenegro	Podgorica	Podgorica Airport	Seasonal	
Montenegro	Tivat	Tivat Airport	Seasonal	
Morocco	Marrakesh	Marrakesh Menara Airport	Seasonal	
Netherlands	Amsterdam	Amsterdam Airport Schiphol		
North Macedonia	Ohrid	Ohrid St. Paul the Apostle Airport	Seasonal	
North Macedonia	Skopje	Skopje International Airport	Seasonal	
Norway	Bergen	Bergen Airport, Flesland		
Norway	Oslo	Oslo Gardermoen Airport		
Norway	Stavanger	Stavanger Airport		
Norway	Tromsø	Tromsø Airport	Seasonal	
Poland	Bydgoszcz	Bydgoszcz Ignacy Jan Paderewski Airport		
Poland	Gdańsk	Gdańsk Lech Wałęsa Airport	Focus city	
Poland	Katowice	Katowice International Airport		
Poland	Kraków	Kraków John Paul II International Airport	Focus city	
Poland	Lublin	Lublin Airport		
Poland	Olsztyn	Olsztyn-Mazury Airport		
Poland	Poznań	Poznań–Ławica Airport		
Poland	Radom	Warsaw Radom Airport	Seasonal	
Poland	Rzeszów	Rzeszów–Jasionka Airport		
Poland	Szczecin	Solidarity Szczecin–Goleniów Airport		
Poland	Warsaw	Warsaw Chopin Airport	Hub	
Poland	Wrocław	Wrocław Airport		
Poland	Zielona Góra	Zielona Góra Airport		
Portugal	Lisbon	Lisbon Airport		
Portugal	Porto	Porto Airport		
Romania	Bucharest	Henri Coandă International Airport		
Romania	Cluj-Napoca	Cluj International Airport		
Romania	Oradea	Oradea International Airport		
Russia	Kaliningrad	Khrabrovo Airport	Terminated	
Russia	Moscow	Moscow Domodedovo Airport	Terminated	
Russia	Moscow	Sheremetyevo International Airport	Suspended	
Russia	Saint Petersburg	Pulkovo Airport	Suspended	
Saudi Arabia	Riyadh	King Khalid International Airport		
Serbia	Belgrade	Belgrade Nikola Tesla Airport		
Singapore	Singapore	Changi Airport	Terminated	
Slovakia	Košice	Košice International Airport		
Slovenia	Ljubljana	Ljubljana Jože Pučnik Airport		
South Korea	Seoul	Incheon International Airport		
Spain	Barcelona	Josep Tarradellas Barcelona–El Prat Airport		
Spain	Girona	Girona–Costa Brava Airport	Seasonal charter	
Spain	Madrid	Madrid–Barajas Airport		
Spain	Málaga	Málaga Airport	Seasonal	
Spain	Palma de Mallorca	Palma de Mallorca Airport		
Spain	Tenerife	Tenerife South Airport	Seasonal	
Sri Lanka	Colombo	Bandaranaike International Airport	Terminated	
Sweden	Gothenburg	Göteborg Landvetter Airport		
Sweden	Stockholm	Stockholm Arlanda Airport		
Switzerland	Geneva	Geneva Airport		
Switzerland	Zurich	Zurich Airport		
Syria	Damascus	Damascus International Airport	Terminated	
Thailand	Bangkok	Suvarnabhumi Airport		
Thailand	Phuket	Phuket International Airport	Seasonal charter	
Turkey	Antalya	Antalya Airport	Seasonal charter	
Turkey	Istanbul	Istanbul Airport		
Ukraine	Kharkiv	Kharkiv International Airport	Suspended	
Ukraine	Kyiv	Boryspil International Airport	Suspended	
Ukraine	Kyiv	Zhuliany International Airport	Suspended	
Ukraine	Lviv	Lviv International Airport	Suspended	
Ukraine	Odesa	Odesa International Airport	Suspended	
Ukraine	Zaporizhzhia	Zaporizhzhia International Airport	Suspended	
United Kingdom	London	London City Airport		
United Kingdom	London	Heathrow Airport		
United States	Chicago	O'Hare International Airport		
United States	Los Angeles	Los Angeles International Airport		
United States	Miami	Miami International Airport		
United States	Newark	Newark Liberty International Airport		
United States	New York City	John F. Kennedy International Airport		
United States	San Francisco	San Francisco International Airport	Seasonal	
Uzbekistan	Tashkent	Tashkent International Airport		
Vietnam	Hanoi	Noi Bai International Airport		
