= Zdzisław =

Zdzisław may refer to:

== People ==
- Zdzisław (given name), a Slavic male given name

== Places ==
- Zdzisław, Lubusz Voivodeship, a village in Poland
- Zdzisław Krzyszkowiak Stadium, a multi-use stadium in Bydgoszcz, Poland
