= Stare Kramsko =

- Village
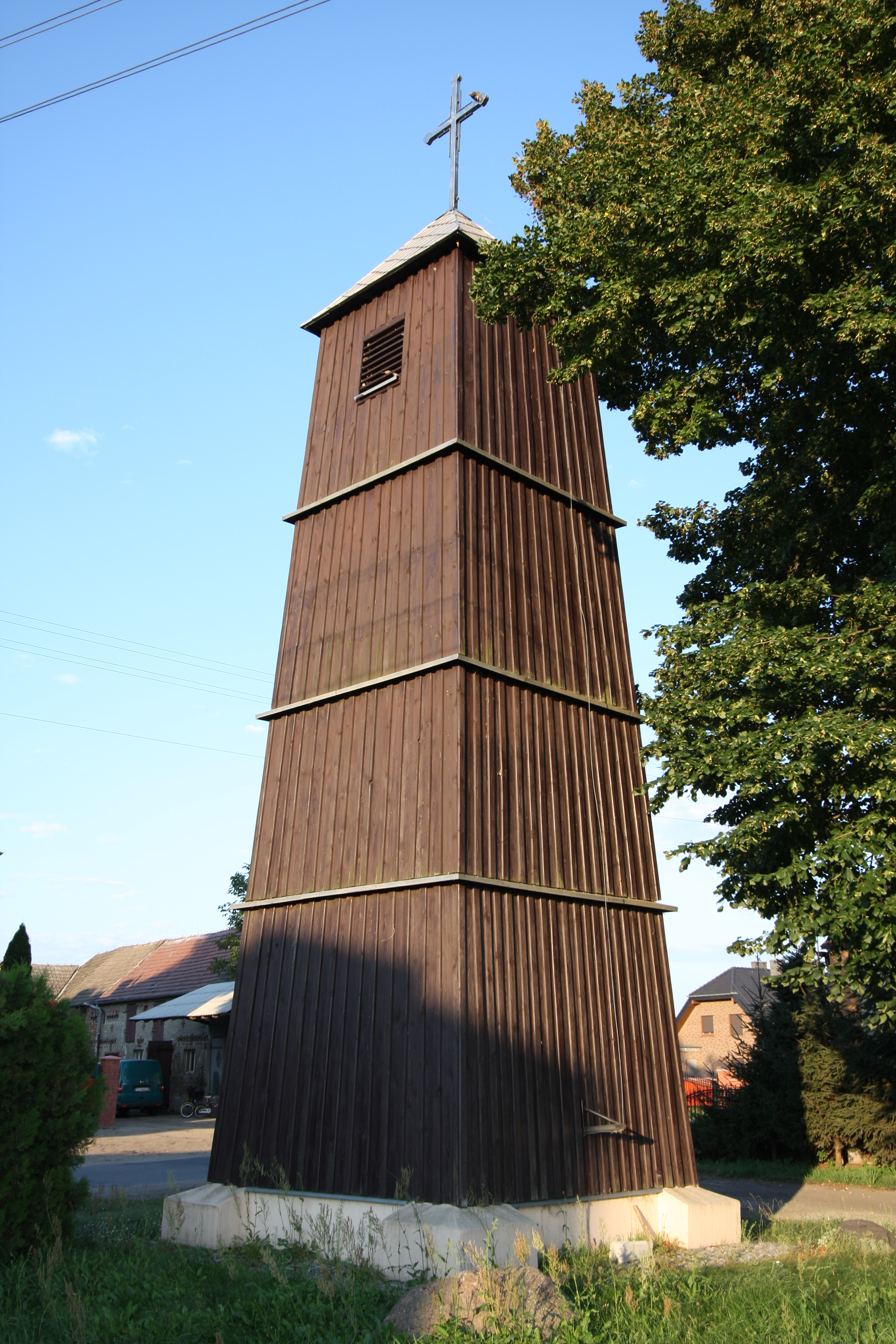
- Old belfry in Stare Kramsko

- Location within Poland
- Coordinates: 52°6′N 15°45′E
- Country: Poland
- Voivodeship: Lubusz
- County: Zielona Góra
- Gmina: Babimost
- Time zone: UTC+1 (CET)
  - Summer (DST): UTC+2 (CEST)
- Vehicle registration: FZI
- Primary airport: Zielona Góra Airport

Stare Kramsko [ˈstarɛ ˈkramskɔ] is a village in the administrative district of Gmina Babimost, within Zielona Góra County, Lubusz Voivodeship, in western Poland. It is situated on the southwestern shore of Lake Wojnowskie.

== History ==
The territory became a part of the emerging Polish state under its first historic ruler Mieszko I in the 10th century. Stare Kramsko was a private church village, administratively located in the Kościan County in the Poznań Voivodeship in the Greater Poland Province.

During World War II, in 1939, the Germans carried out arrests of local Polish activists and school teachers, who were then deported to concentration camps (see Nazi crimes against the Polish nation). After the defeat of Nazi Germany in the war, in 1945, the village was restored to Poland.
