= Nowe Kramsko =

- Village
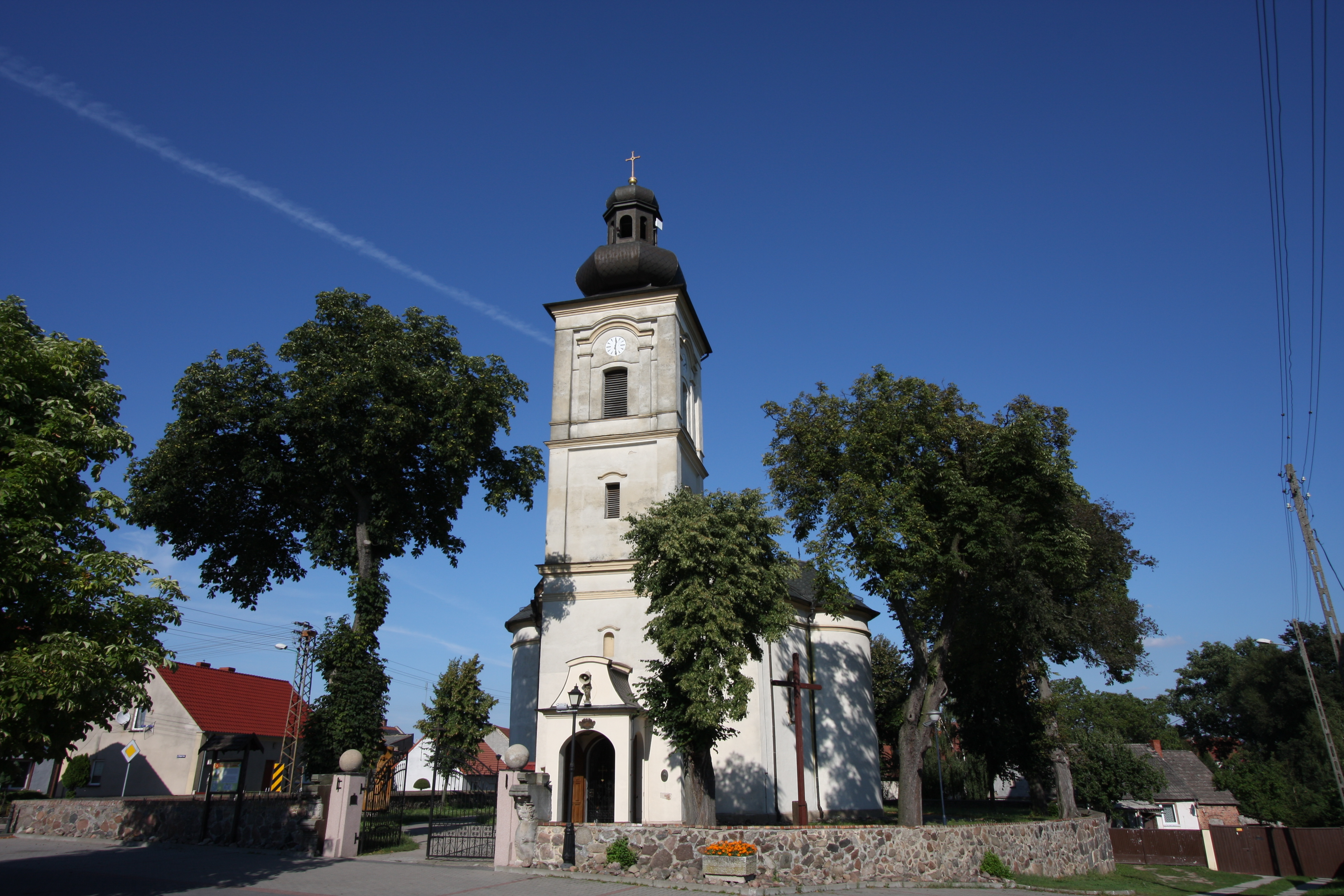
- Church of the Nativity of the Virgin Mary in Nowe Kramsko

- Location within Poland
- Coordinates: 52°8′N 15°46′E
- Country: Poland
- Voivodeship: Lubusz
- County: Zielona Góra
- Gmina: Babimost
- Established: 13th century

Population (approx.)
  - Total: 854
- Time zone: UTC+1 (CET)
  - Summer (DST): UTC+2 (CEST)
- Postal code: 66-111
- Area code: +48 68
- Vehicle registration: FZI
- Primary airport: Zielona Góra Airport

Nowe Kramsko [ˈnɔvɛ ˈkramskɔ] is a village in the administrative district of Gmina Babimost, within Zielona Góra County, Lubusz Voivodeship, in western Poland. It is situated on the northern shore of Lake Wojnowskie.

The Zielona Góra Airport is located in Nowe Kramsko.

== History ==
Nowe Kramsko was founded in the 13th century. In 1314 it was granted to the Cistercians of Obra. It remained a possession of the Cistercians, administratively located in the Kościan County in the Poznań Voivodeship in the Greater Poland Province, until the Second Partition of Poland, when it was annexed by Prussia. After the successful Greater Poland uprising of 1806, it was regained by Poles and included within the short-lived Duchy of Warsaw, and after the dissolution of the duchy in 1815 it was annexed by Prussia again. Despite the Germanisation policies pursued by the Prussian authorities towards the local population, Polish associations were founded in the village: the Association of Industrialists and Farmers (Towarzystwo Przemysłowców i Rolników) in 1895 and the Catholic Association of Polish Workers (Katolickie Towarzystwo Robotników Polskich) in 1904. In 1912, the Polish Bank Ludowy was founded in the village. On 2–3 February 1919, during the Greater Poland Uprising, the village was the site of the Battle of Nowe Kramsko, won by the Polish insurgents against Germany.

In 1939, the Gestapo carried out an anti-Polish operation in the village, closing down a local Polish farmers' association and a cooperative, and confiscating their files and funds. In 1939, the Germans also carried out arrests of local Polish leaders, activists and school teachers, who were then deported to concentration camps (see Nazi crimes against the Polish nation). Following the defeat of Nazi Germany in World War II, in 1945, the village was restored to Poland.

== Sights ==
Among the historic sights of Nowe Kramsko are the church of the Nativity of the Virgin Mary with the church cemetery, an old wooden windmill and a manor house, which currently houses a library. There is also a memorial stone dedicated to the Greater Poland insurgents of 1918–19.

== Sports ==
The local football club is Polonia Nowe Kramsko. It competes in the lower leagues.

== Notable people ==
- Łucjan Królikowski (1919–2019), Polish Conventual Franciscan, sybirak, centenarian
- Joachim Benyskiewicz (1936–2011), Polish historian

== Gallery ==
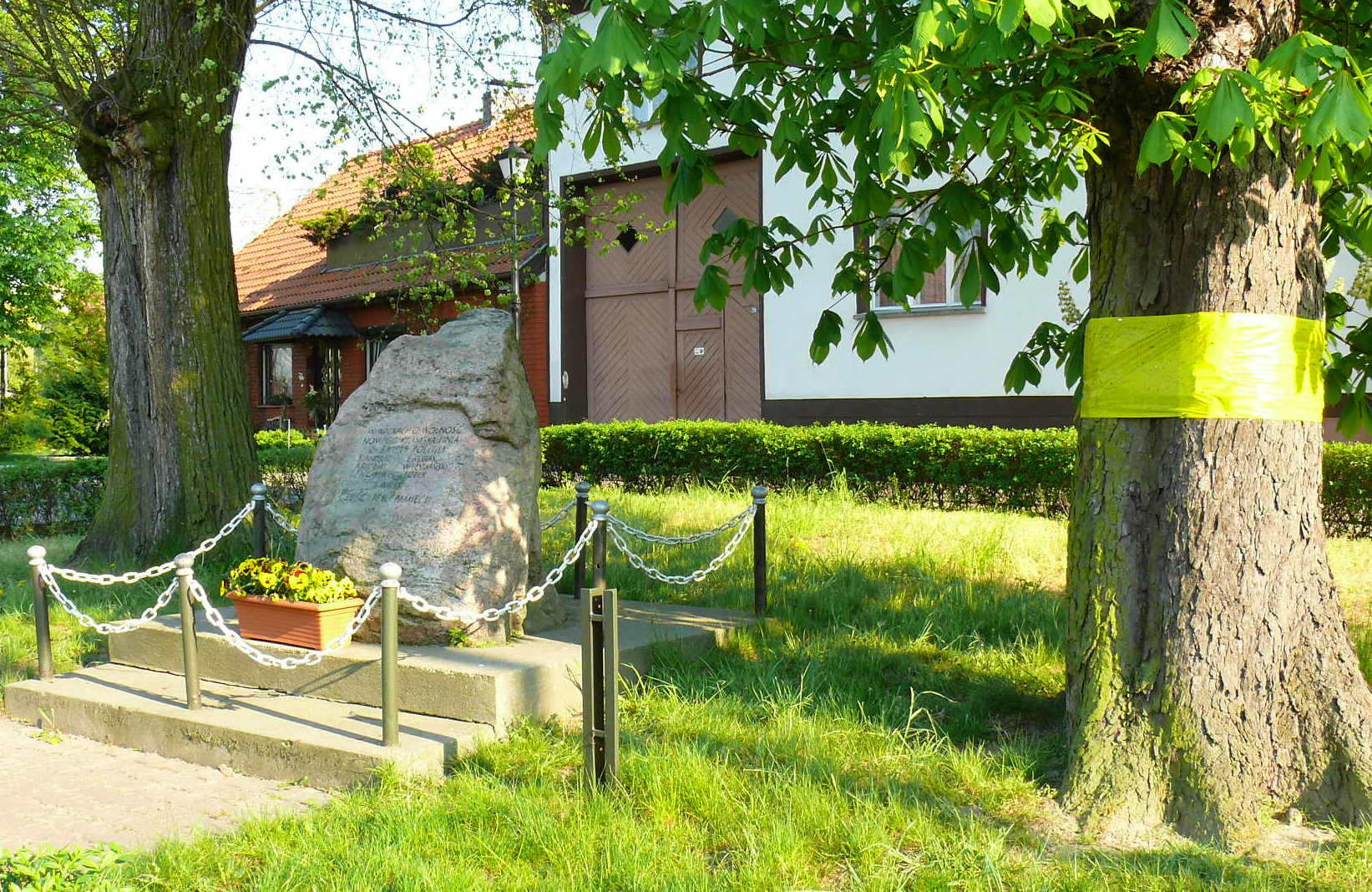
Memorial stone to the Greater Poland insurgents of 1918–19

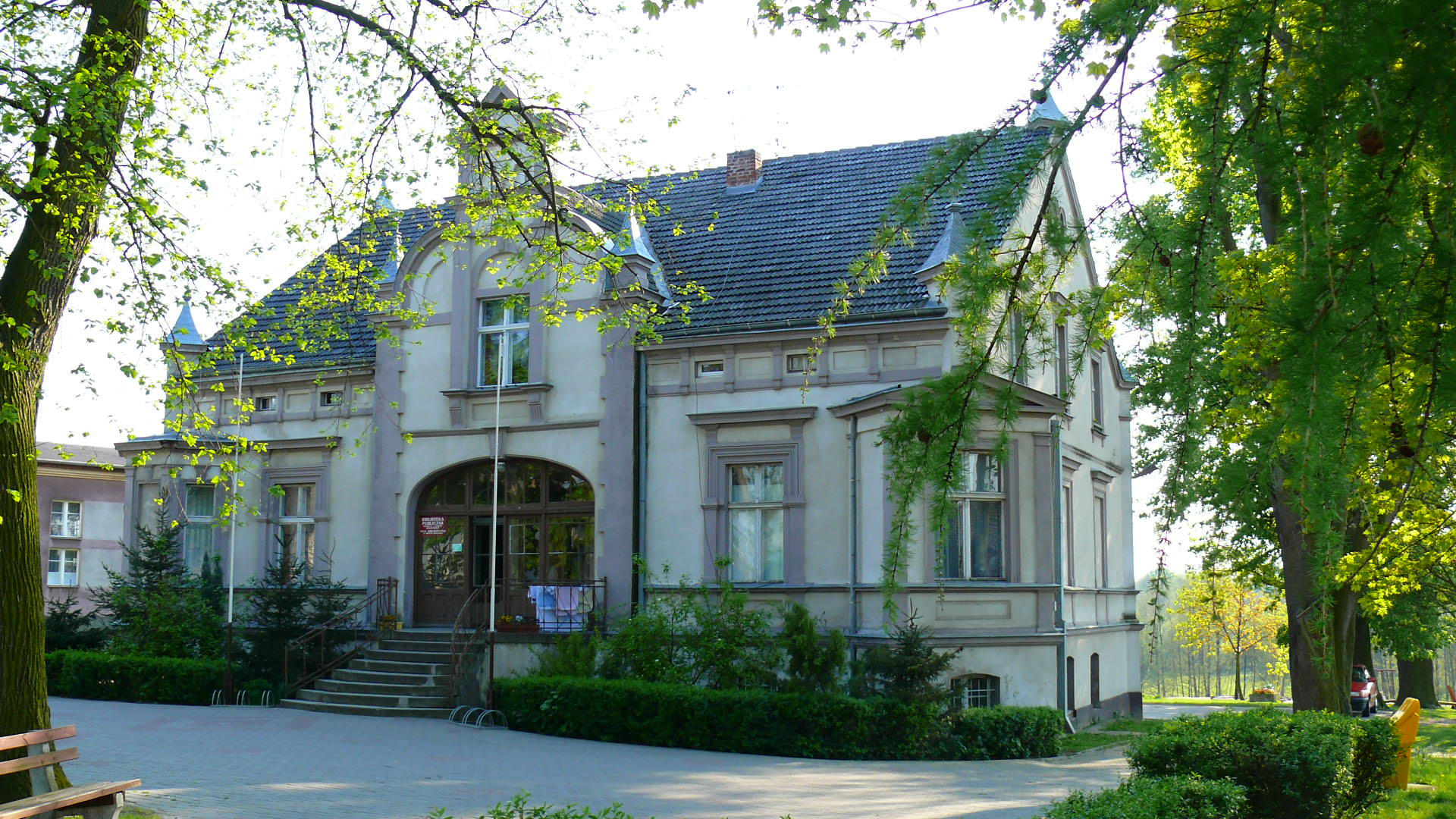
Library

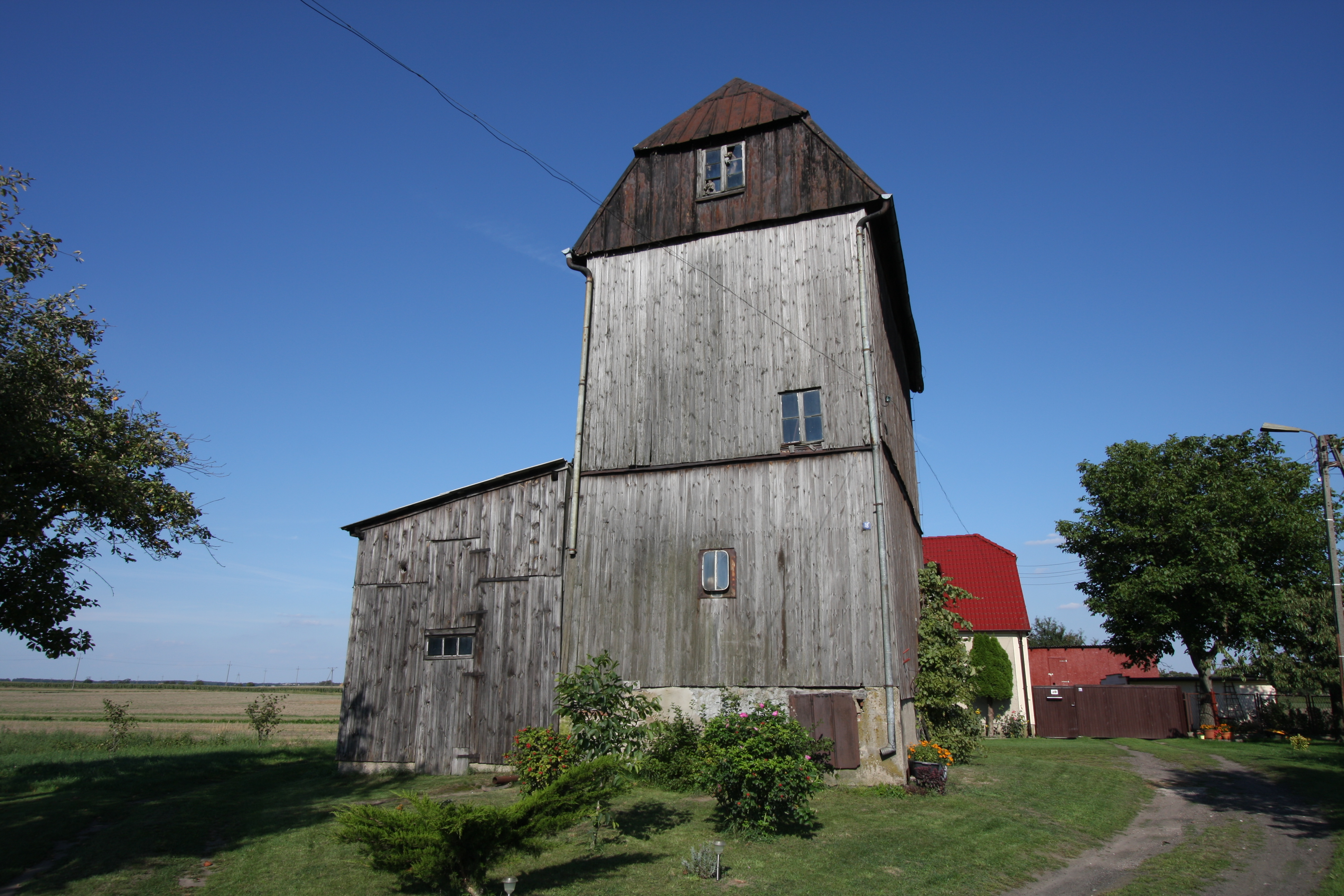
Windmill

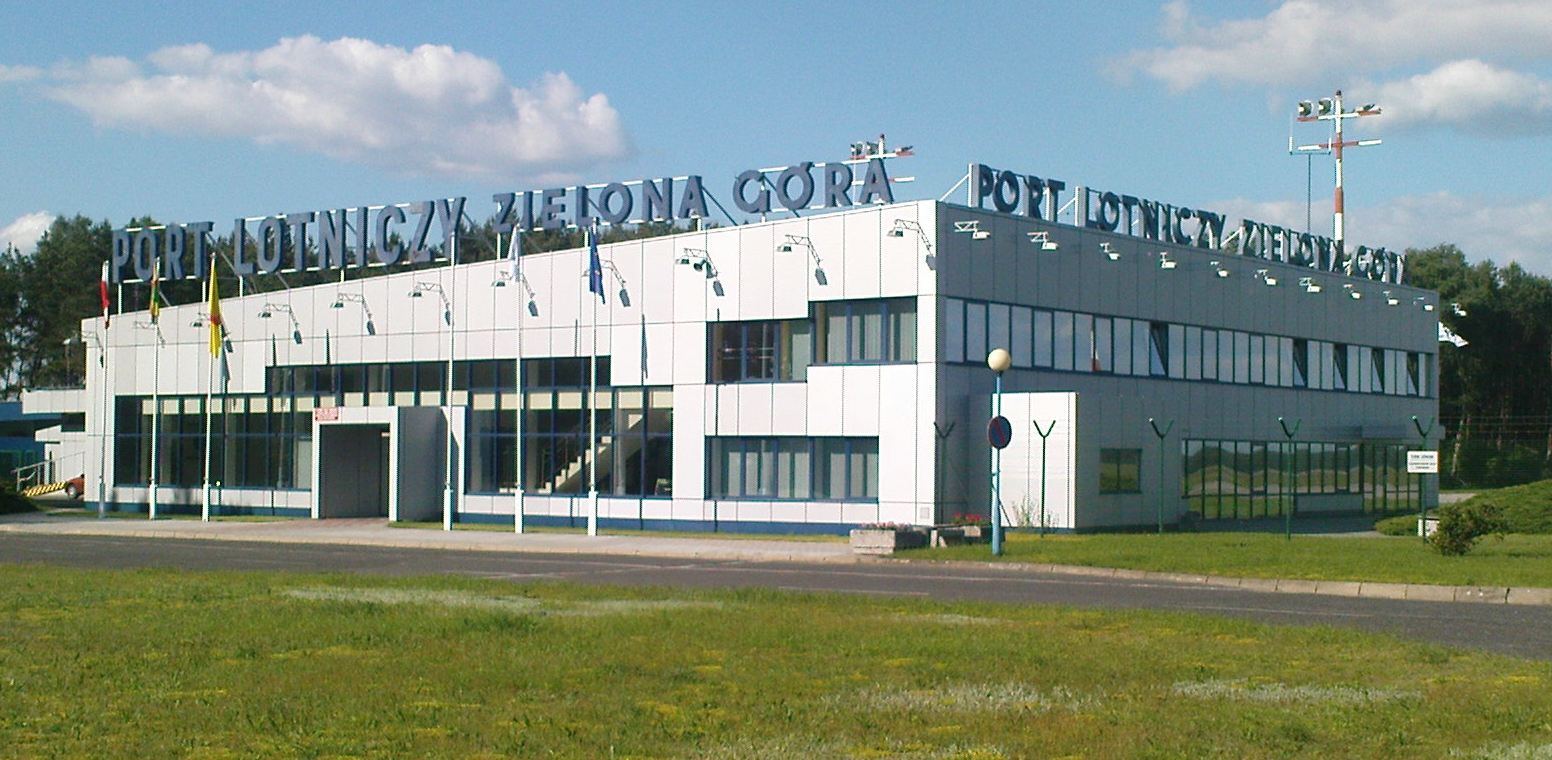
Zielona Góra Airport
