= Zdeslav =

Zdeslav or Zdislav may refer to:

== People ==
- Zdeslav of Croatia (died 879), Prince of Dalmatian Croatia
- Zdeslav of Sternberg (died c. 1263), Czech nobleman
- Zdislav Soroko, Soviet canoer
- Zdeslav Vrdoljak (born 1971), Croatian water polo player

== Places ==
- Zdeslav, a village and part of Čistá (Rakovník District), Central Bohemian Region
- Zdeslav, a village and part of Poleň, Plzeň Region

== See also ==
- Zdzisław (given name)
