= Babimost =

Town in Lubusz Voivodeship, Poland

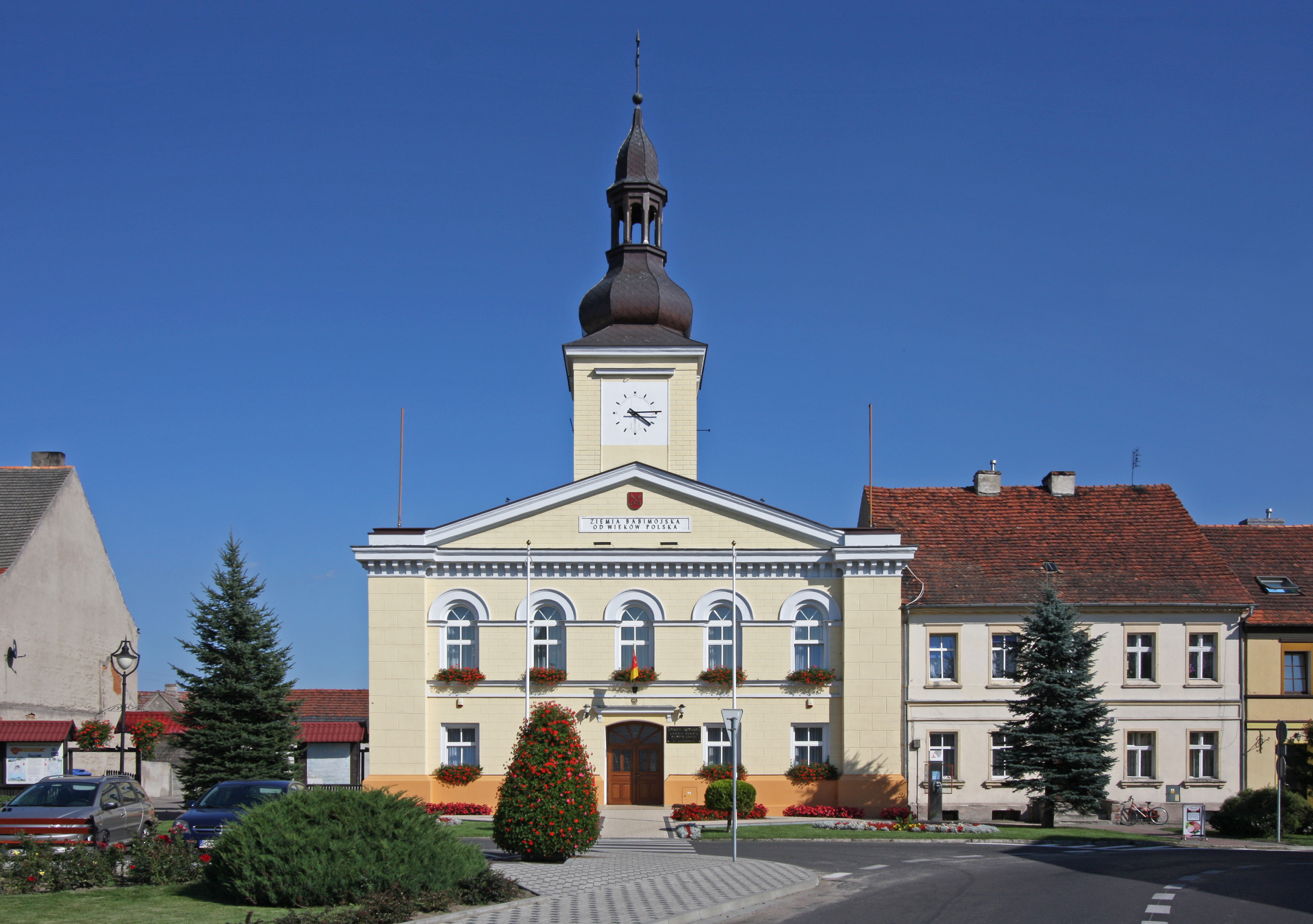
- Town center with the town hall

- Flag Coat of arms

- Location within Poland
- Coordinates: 52°09′53″N 15°49′40″E
- Country: Poland
- Voivodeship: Lubusz
- County: Zielona Góra
- Gmina: Babimost
- Town rights: 1397

Government
  - Mayor: Bernard Radny

Area
  - Total: 3.65 km^{2} (1.41 sq mi)

Population (30 June 2022)
  - Total: 3,848
  - Density: 1,054/km^{2} (2,730/sq mi)
- Time zone: UTC+1 (CET)
  - Summer (DST): UTC+2 (CEST)
- Postal code: 66-110
- Area code: +48 68
- Car plates: FZI
- Climate: Dfb
- Primary airport: Zielona Góra Airport
- Website: babimost.pl

Babimost (Polish pronunciation: [baˈbʲimɔst]; German: Bomst) is a town in Zielona Góra County, Lubusz Voivodeship, western Poland. It is the administrative seat of Gmina Babimost. Babimost has an area of 3.65 square kilometres (1.41 square miles), and as of June 2022 it has a population of 3,848.

== Geography ==
The town is situated on the Leniwa Obra creek. Though located in Lubusz Voivodeship, Babimost is part of the Greater Poland historical region.

== History ==
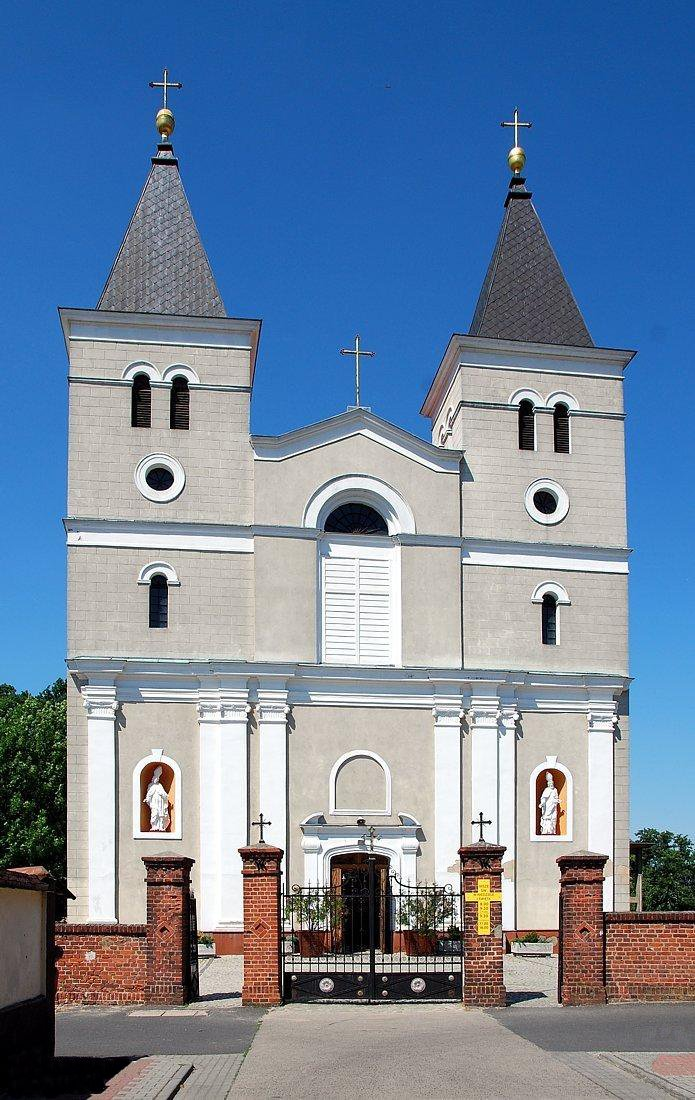
Baroque St. Lawrence Church

The territory became a part of the emerging Polish state under its first historic ruler Mieszko I in the 10th century. The settlement probably arose about 1000 AD around a castellany located at a crossing through the swampy Leniwa Obra river. The estates were held by the Pomeranian Swienca family until 1307; together with nearby Sulechów, they were acquired by Margrave Waldemar of Brandenburg in 1319, who nevertheless died in the same year. By 1329, they were held by the Silesian duke Henry IV the Faithful, then a Bohemian vassal. Finally incorporated into the Polish Poznań Voivodeship in 1332 (which was later also part of the larger Greater Poland Province), Babimost received town privileges according to Magdeburg Law by King Władysław II Jagiełło in 1397. It was a royal town of Poland. King Sigismund the Old confirmed the town rights in 1530.

After the Protestant Reformation, the population increased due to the influx of German-speaking refugees from Silesia. Oppressed by the Catholic Habsburg rule, they were granted religious freedom by Polish king John II Casimir Vasa. In the mid-17th century, the starost of Babimost was Krzysztof Żegocki, who during the Swedish invasion of Poland was the first to organize a guerrilla unit to fight the invading forces and became famous in the battles of Kościan and Jasna Góra, thus earning the title of the "First Partisan of the Commonwealth". During the war, which was part of the Second Northern War, Babimost was devastated by Swedish troops in 1656. The reconstruction of a synagogue is documented around 1700, a Protestant church was erected in 1782. The inhabitants were mainly shoe manufacturers, linen producers and hop (beer) and wine producers.

Upon the Second Partition of Poland in 1793, the town fell to Prussia. After the successful Greater Poland uprising of 1806, it was regained by the Poles and included within the short-lived Duchy of Warsaw. At the Congress of Vienna in 1815, it again passed to Prussia, and was incorporated into the Grand Duchy of Posen. Prussians conducted a policy of Germanisation towards the local population. German was introduced in Polish schools, German colonists were settled to change the ethnic composition. Between 1818 and 1938 it was part of the Bomst district within the Prussian Regierungsbezirk Posen, though the administrative seat was at Wollstein (Wolsztyn). When the town became part of the German Empire in 1871, it had 2,272 inhabitants, of whom 1,042 were Catholics (mostly Poles), 1,070 were Protestants (mostly Germans) and 160 Jewish. Despite attempts at Germanisation, Poles founded new organizations in the town, including an agricultural association (Kółko Rolnicze), People's Bank (Bank Ludowy) and the Catholic Association of Polish Youth (Katolicki Związek Młodzieży Polskiej).

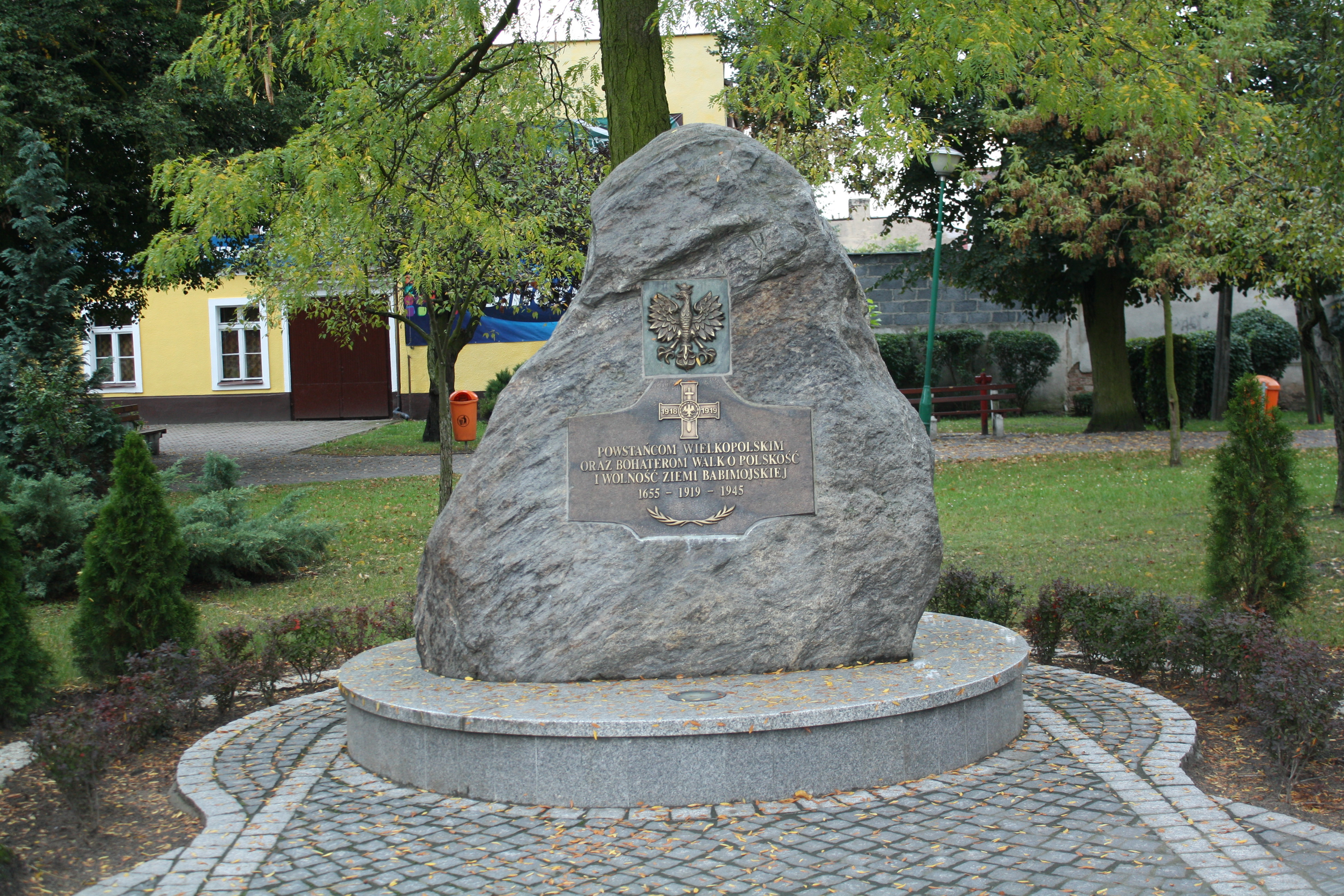
A memorial stone dedicated to the Greater Poland insurgents and heroes of the fight for liberation of the Babimost land until 1945

After Poland regained independence in 1918, Poles from the town and the surrounding area actively joined the Greater Poland Uprising to rejoin the area with Poland. On January 24, 1919, the insurgents captured Babimost, but under the Treaty of Versailles the town remained within Germany. In the interwar period, the town lay on the border with the Second Polish Republic; remaining with the German province of Posen-West Prussia and from 1938 to 1945 as part of the Province of Brandenburg. The majority of the town's population was German-speaking, while up to a third of its residents were Poles. Attempts at Germanisation intensified, in response Poles set up private schools, gathered in theater groups and choirs, Polish press was spreading, and Polish organizations were active. In 1939, 1,950 inhabitants were registered as citizens of the town, of whom 600 were ethnic Polish. During the German invasion of Poland, in September 1939, the Germans arrested several regional Polish activists (including local Polish leader Jan Cichy), who were then deported to Nazi concentration camps, and later also expelled several Polish families from the county.

After the Vistula–Oder Offensive of the Red Army in the late days of World War II, large parts of the town lay in ruins. In 1945, Babimost was reintegrated with Poland and its German inhabitants were to be expelled by the new administration in accordance with the Potsdam Agreement. However, with Polish and German ethnicities coexisting over centuries, no clear division between Poles and Germans could be made, so that the majority of those who were to be expelled, could stay by renouncing any German language and culture.

== Transport ==
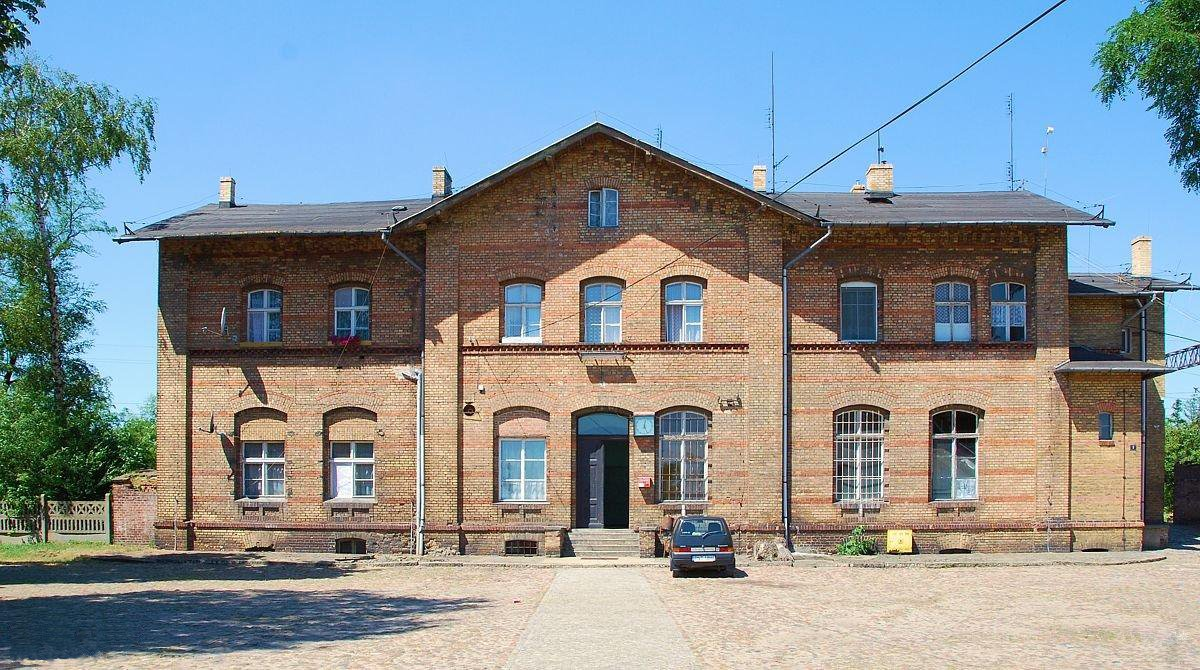
Babimost railway station

Voivodeship roads 303, 304 and 313 pass through the town. There is a railway station in Babimost and the Zielona Góra Airport is located nearby.

== Demographics ==
Historical population

| Year | Pop. | ±% |
|---|---|---|
| 1843 | 2,278 | — |
| 1871 | 2,272 | −0.3% |
| 1880 | 2,179 | −4.1% |
| 1890 | 2,341 | +7.4% |
| 1900 | 2,123 | −9.3% |
| 1910 | 2,000 | −5.8% |

| Year | Pop. | ±% |
|---|---|---|
| 1925 | 1,782 | −10.9% |
| 1939 | 2,190 | +22.9% |
| 1950 | 1,729 | −21.1% |
| 1960 | 2,584 | +49.5% |
| 2010 | 4,196 | +62.4% |

== Sports ==
The local football club is Klon Babimost. It competes in the lower leagues.

The local floorball club is Fenomen Babimost.

== International relations ==
=== Twin towns – sister cities ===
See twin towns of Gmina Babimost.

== See also ==
- Zielona Góra Airport
