= Kuligowo, Zielona Góra County =

Kuligowo
- Village
- Location within Poland
- Coordinates: 52°8′5″N 15°48′28″E
- Country: Poland
- Voivodeship: Lubusz
- County: Zielona Góra
- Gmina: Babimost

Kuligowo [kulʲiˈɡɔvɔ] is a village in the administrative district of Gmina Babimost, within Zielona Góra County, Lubusz Voivodeship, in western Poland.
