= Podzamcze, Lubusz Voivodeship =

Podzamcze
- Village
- Location within Poland
- Coordinates: 52°09′31″N 15°49′20″E
- Country: Poland
- Voivodeship: Lubusz
- County: Zielona Góra
- Gmina: Babimost

Podzamcze [pɔˈd͡zamt͡ʂɛ] is a village in the administrative district of Gmina Babimost, within Zielona Góra County, Lubusz Voivodeship, in western Poland.
