= Janowiec, Zielona Góra County =

Janowiec
- Village
- Location within Poland
- Coordinates: 52°07′47″N 15°44′36″E
- Country: Poland
- Voivodeship: Lubusz
- County: Zielona Góra
- Gmina: Babimost

Janowiec [jaˈnɔvʲɛt͡s] is a village in the administrative district of Gmina Babimost, within Zielona Góra County, Lubusz Voivodeship, in western Poland.
