= Laski, Gmina Babimost =

Laski
- Village
- Location within Poland
- Coordinates: 52°10′10″N 15°46′45″E
- Country: Poland
- Voivodeship: Lubusz
- County: Zielona Góra
- Gmina: Babimost

Laski [ˈlaskʲi] is a village in the administrative district of Gmina Babimost, within Zielona Góra County, Lubusz Voivodeship, in western Poland.
