= Leśniki, Lubusz Voivodeship =

Leśniki
- Village
- Location within Poland
- Coordinates: 52°7′51″N 15°50′11″E
- Country: Poland
- Voivodeship: Lubusz
- County: Zielona Góra
- Gmina: Babimost

Leśniki [lɛɕˈɲikʲi] is a village in the administrative district of Gmina Babimost, within Zielona Góra County, Lubusz Voivodeship, in western Poland.
