= Kolesin =

- Village
- Location within Poland
- Coordinates: 52°8′N 15°45′E
- Country: Poland
- Voivodeship: Lubusz
- County: Zielona Góra
- Gmina: Babimost
- Population: 233

Kolesin [kɔˈlɛɕin] is a village in the administrative district of Gmina Babimost, within Zielona Góra County, Lubusz Voivodeship, in western Poland.
