= Gmina Babimost =

Gmina Babimost Babimost Commune
- Gmina
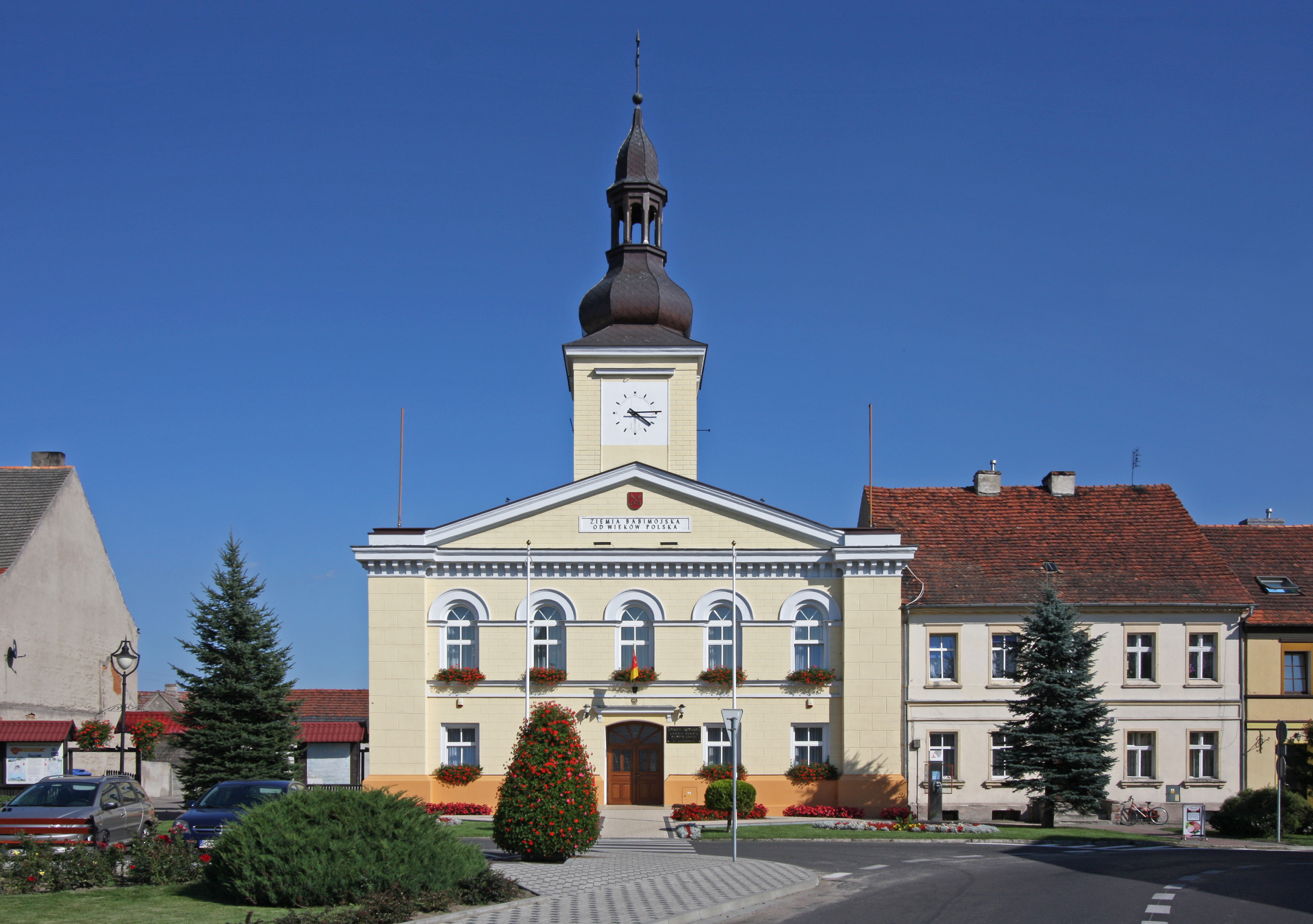
- Town Hall in Babimost, seat of the gmina office

- Flag Coat of arms

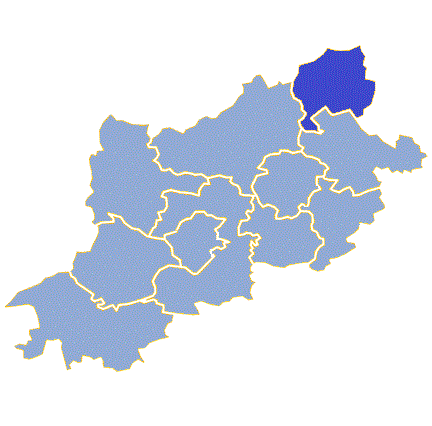
- Gmina Babimost in Zielona Góra County
- Coordinates (Babimost): 52°9′N 15°49′E
- Country: Poland
- Voivodeship: Lubusz
- County: Zielona Góra
- Seat: Babimost

Area
  - Total: 92.75 km^{2} (35.81 sq mi)

Population (2019-06-30)
  - Total: 6,212
  - Density: 66.98/km^{2} (173.5/sq mi)
  - Urban: 3,926
  - Rural: 2,286
- Time zone: UTC+1 (CET)
  - Summer (DST): UTC+2 (CEST)
- Vehicle registration: FZI

Gmina Babimost is an urban-rural gmina (administrative district) in Zielona Góra County, Lubusz Voivodeship, in western Poland. Its seat is the town of Babimost, which lies approximately 32 kilometres (20 mi) north-east of Zielona Góra.

The gmina covers an area of 92.75 square kilometres (35.8 sq mi), and as of 2019 its total population is 6,212.

== Villages ==
Apart from the town of Babimost, Gmina Babimost contains the villages and settlements of Janowiec, Kolesin, Kuligowo, Laski, Leśniki, Nowe Kramsko, Podmokle Małe, Podmokle Wielkie, Podzamcze, Stare Kramsko and Zdzisław.

== Neighbouring gminas ==
Gmina Babimost is bordered by the gminas of Kargowa, Siedlec, Sulechów, Szczaniec, Zbąszyń and Zbąszynek.

== Twin towns – sister cities ==
Gmina Babimost is twinned with:

- Amt Döbern-Land, Germany
- Neuruppin, Germany
