= Zdzislaw Sikora =

American artist

Zdzislaw R. Sikora
- Born: 1952 (age 73–74); Mannheim, Germany
- Known for: printmaking

Zdzislaw R. Sikora (born 1952) is a German-born American artist. His work is included in the collections of the Smithsonian American Art Museum, the New Britain Museum of American Art, and the Museum of Fine Arts, Houston.
