= Čistá (Mladá Boleslav District) =

- Municipality
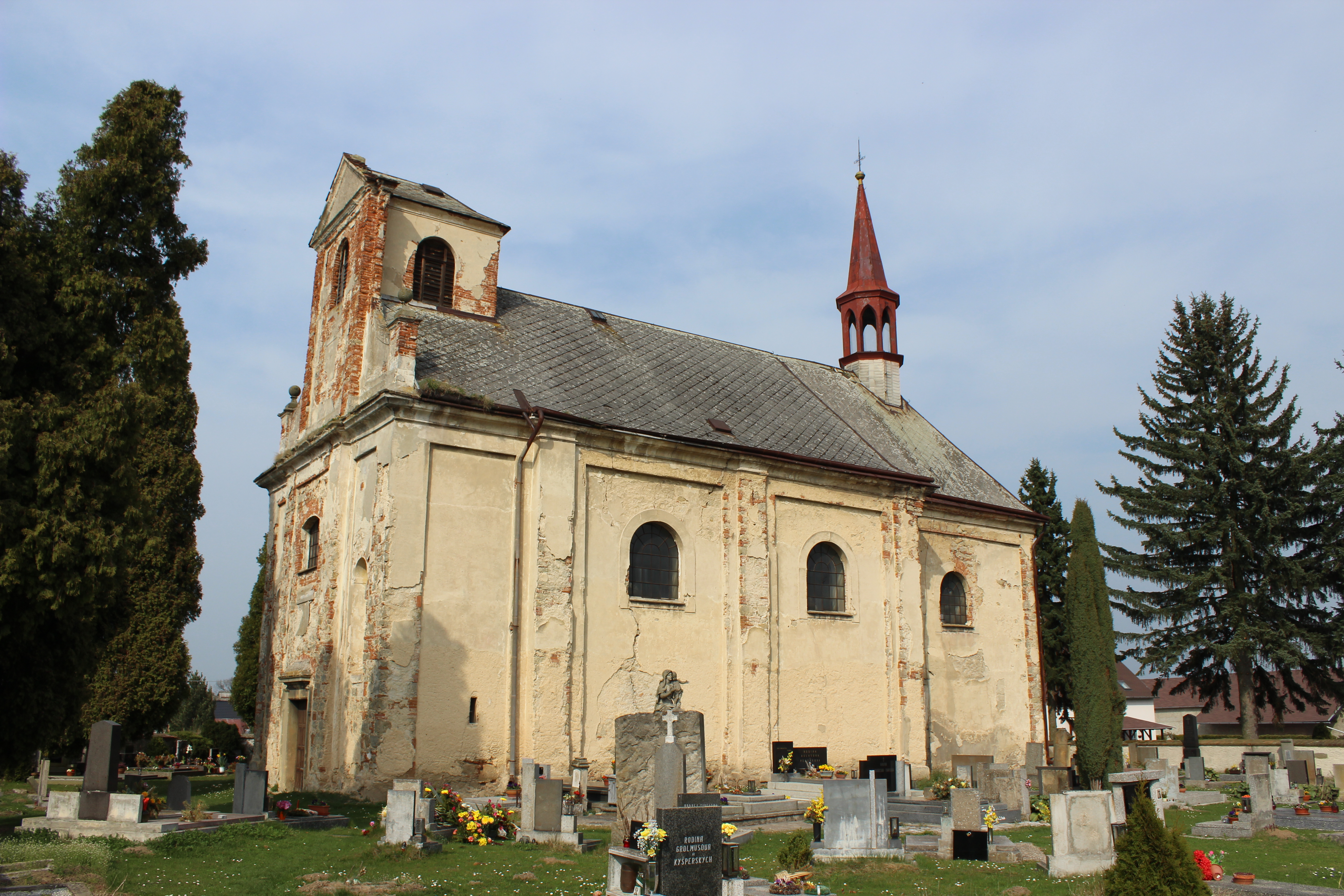
- Church of Saint Lawrence

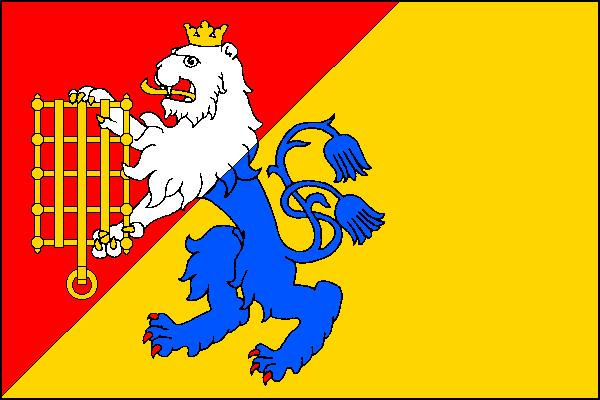
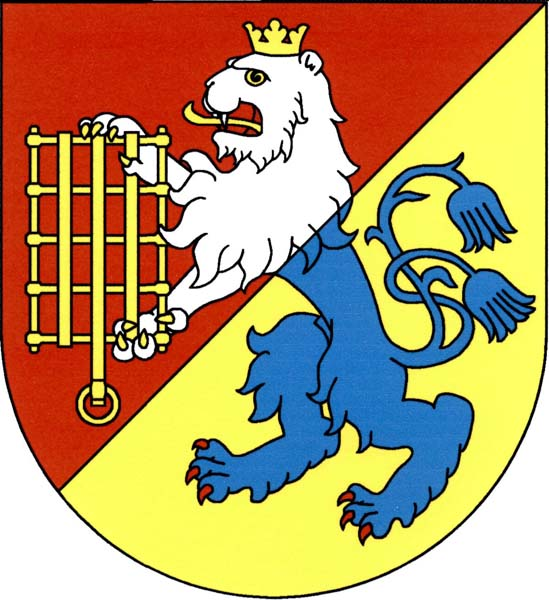
- Flag Coat of arms

- Location in the Czech Republic
- Coordinates: 50°28′22″N 14°50′42″E
- Country: Czech Republic
- Region: Central Bohemian
- District: Mladá Boleslav
- First mentioned: 1351

Area
  - Total: 8.99 km^{2} (3.47 sq mi)
- Elevation: 275 m (902 ft)

Population (2026-01-01)
  - Total: 886
  - Density: 98.6/km^{2} (255/sq mi)
- Time zone: UTC+1 (CET)
  - Summer (DST): UTC+2 (CEST)
- Postal code: 294 23
- Website: obeccista.cz

Čistá is a municipality and village in Mladá Boleslav District in the Central Bohemian Region of the Czech Republic. It has about 900 inhabitants.

== Etymology ==
The name Čistá literally means 'clean', 'clear' in Czech. The name refers to the time when the village was cleansed from paying taxes after its foundation. It was a reward to the settlers for settling a new area and protecting a trade route.

== Geography ==
Čistá is located about 7 kilometres (4 mi) northwest of Mladá Boleslav and 46 km (29 mi) northeast of Prague. It lies in the Jizera Table.

== History ==
The first written mention of Čistá is in a deed of King Charles IV from 1351. In 1625, the village was acquired by Albrecht von Wallenstein, who annexed it to the Frýdlant estate.

== Demographics ==
Historical population

Year	Pop.	±%
1869	452	—
1880	487	+7.7%
1890	568	+16.6%
1900	714	+25.7%
1910	780	+9.2%

Year	Pop.	±%
1921	820	+5.1%
1930	1,007	+22.8%
1950	725	−28.0%
1961	756	+4.3%
1970	637	−15.7%

Year	Pop.	±%
1980	601	−5.7%
1991	561	−6.7%
2001	614	+9.4%
2011	718	+16.9%
2021	858	+19.5%

Source: Censuses

== Transport ==
The I/38 road (the section from Mladá Boleslav to Česká Lípa) runs through the municipality.

== Sights ==
The main landmark of Čistá is the Church of Saint Lawrence. It was built in the Neoclassical style in 1697–1700 and reconstructed in 1897.
