= Bradel binding =

Style of book binding

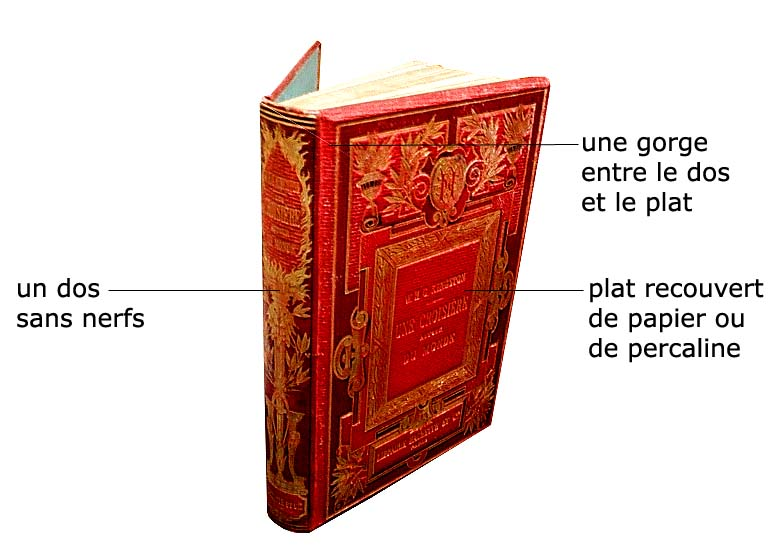

A Bradel binding (also called a bonnet or bristol board binding) is a style of book binding with a hollow back. It most resembles a case binding in that it has a hollow back and visible joint, but unlike a case binding, the cover boards and spine stiffener are joined together with a strip of sturdy paper before covering.

One characteristic of the binding is that the material covering the outside boards is separate from that covering the spine. Many bookbinders consider the Bradel binding to be stronger than case binding.

== History ==
The binding may be traced to 18th-century Germany. The originator is uncertain, but the name comes from a French binder working in Germany, Alexis-Pierre Bradel (also known as Bradel l'ainé or Bradel-Derome). The binding originally appeared as a temporary binding, but the results were durable, and the binding had great success in the nineteenth century. Today, it is most likely to be encountered in photo albums and scrapbooks.

The binding has the advantage of allowing the book to open fully, where traditional leather bindings are too rigid. It is sometimes modified to provide a rounded spine. This lends the appearance of a book where the paper is not suited to spine rounding; this is also to provide a rounded spine to a book too thin for a spine rounding to hold. The binding may also provide an impressive-looking leather spine to a book without incurring the full expense of binding a book in full or partial leather.

== See also ==
- Book design
- History of books
