= Zdzisław Skrok =

Polish archaeologist and writer

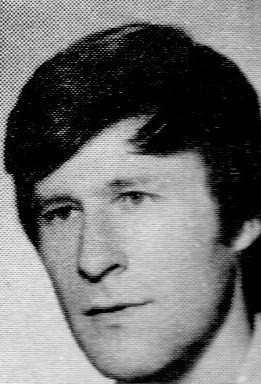
- Skrok in 1989
- Born: Zdzisław Skrok; 1950 (age 75–76)
- Education: University of Warsaw
- Scientific career
- Fields: Archaeology, marine archaeology, Slavic studies, Viking studies, material culture
- Website: iskry.com.pl/113_skrok-zdzislaw

Zdzisław Skrok (Polish pronunciation: [ˈzdʑiswaf skrɔk]; born 1950) is a Polish archaeologist and writer. He has published over twenty collections of essays on history (especially of Slavs and Vikings), archaeology, marine exploration and material culture. He is known for his theory of a Viking ancestry of Mieszko I, the first historical sovereign of Poland. He was one of the consultants interviewed in the five-episode documentary film "The Vikings" by Paul Russell and Andrea Vogt.

== Books ==
- Na tropach archeologicznych tajemnic Mazowsza (1980) ISBN 83-207-0289-5
- Archeologia mórz (1982) ISBN 83-215-3248-9
- Rodowód z głębi ziemi (1984) ISBN 83-205-3623-5
- W poszukiwaniu Eldorado i Ziemi Obiecanej (1985) ISBN 83-207-0689-0
- Wyjście z kamiennego świata (1988) ISBN 83-205-3740-1
- Wykopaliska na pograniczu światów (1988) ISBN 83-100-9222-9
- Badania archeologiczne Pracowni Konserwacji Zabytków (1988) ISBN 83-850-4408-6
- Sezam starożytności (1989) ISBN 83-203-2692-3
- Odkrywcy oceanów (1990) ISBN 83-215-3266-7
- Archeologia podwodna (1991) ISBN 83-221-0539-8
- Skarby i skorupy (1992) ISBN 83-859-1048-4
- Świat dawnych piratów (1998) ISBN 83-8667889-5
- Mazowsze nieznane (1999) ISBN 83-855-3109-2
- Skarby małe i duże' (2001) ISBN 83-911-8511-7
- Skarby Polski (2002) ISBN 83-110-9499-3
- Słowiańska moc (2006) ISBN 83-244-0008-7
- Podolska legenda (2007) ISBN 978-83-244-0262-5
- Wielkie rozdroże (2008) ISBN 83-244-0069-9
- Mądrość prawieków (2009) ISBN 978-83-244-0111-6
- Wymowność rzeczy (2012) ISBN 978-83-244-0212-0
- Czy Wikingowie stworzyli Polskę? (2013) ISBN 978-83-244-0333-2

In 1995, Skrok also translated Richard Leakey's The Origin of Humankind into Polish. (Pochodzenie człowieka, ISBN 83-854-5851-4)
