= Zdzisław, Lubusz Voivodeship =

Zdzisław
- Village
- Location within Poland
- Coordinates: 52°11′N 15°51′E
- Country: Poland
- Voivodeship: Lubusz
- County: Zielona Góra
- Gmina: Babimost

Zdzisław is a village in the administrative district of Gmina Babimost, within Zielona Góra County, Lubusz Voivodeship, in western Poland.
