= Čistá (Rakovník District) =

- Market town
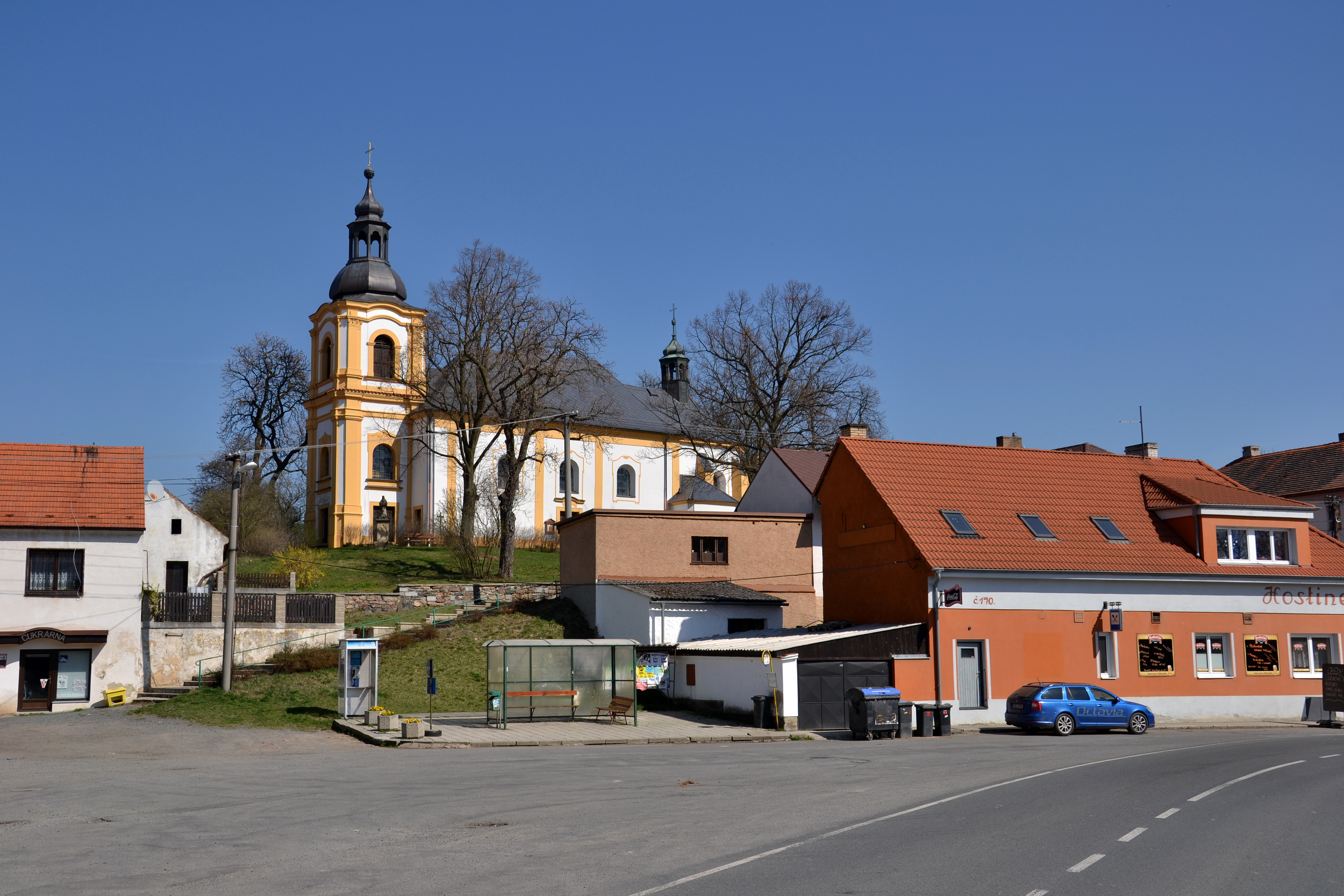
- Centre with the Church of Saint Wenceslaus

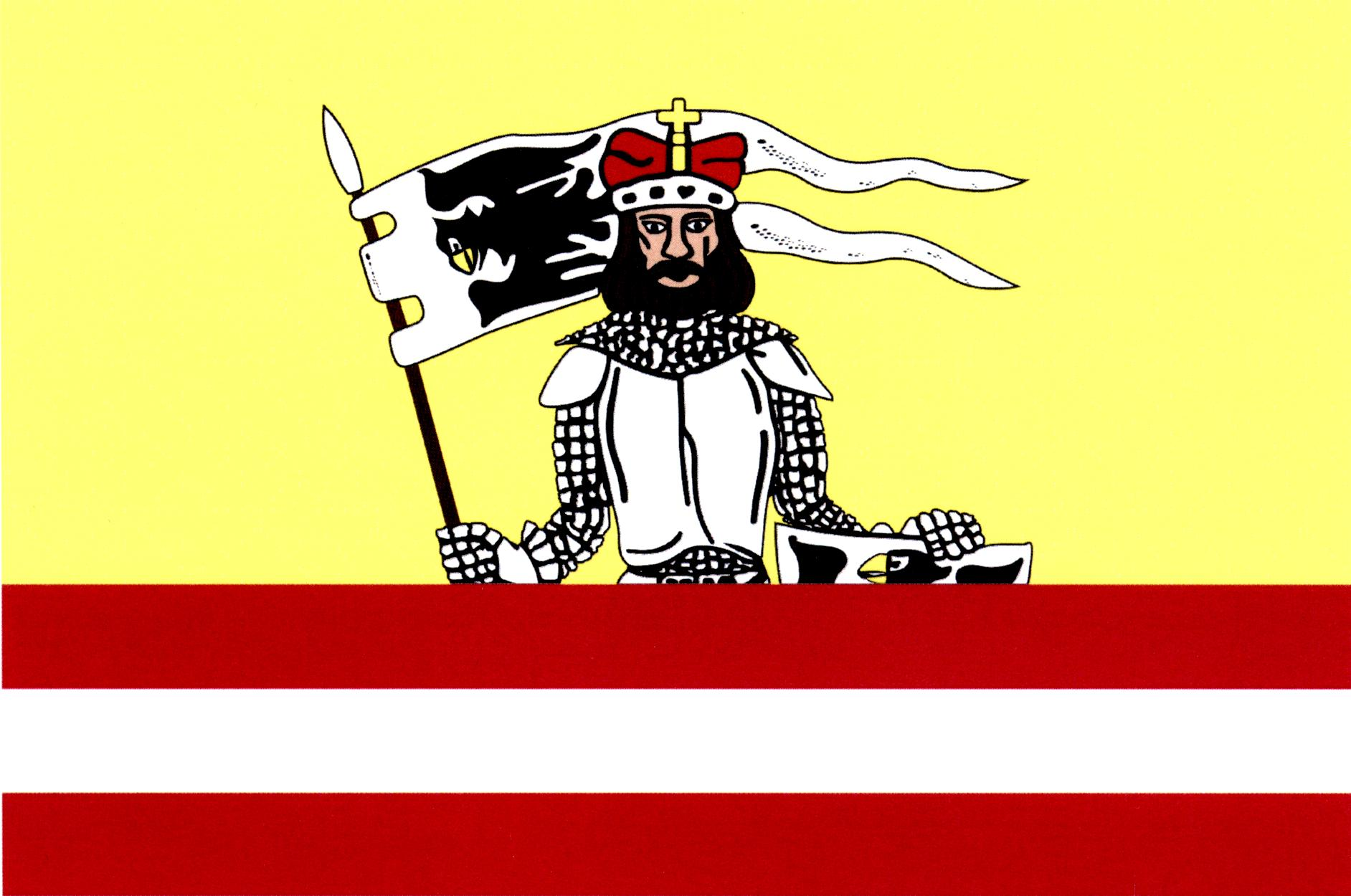
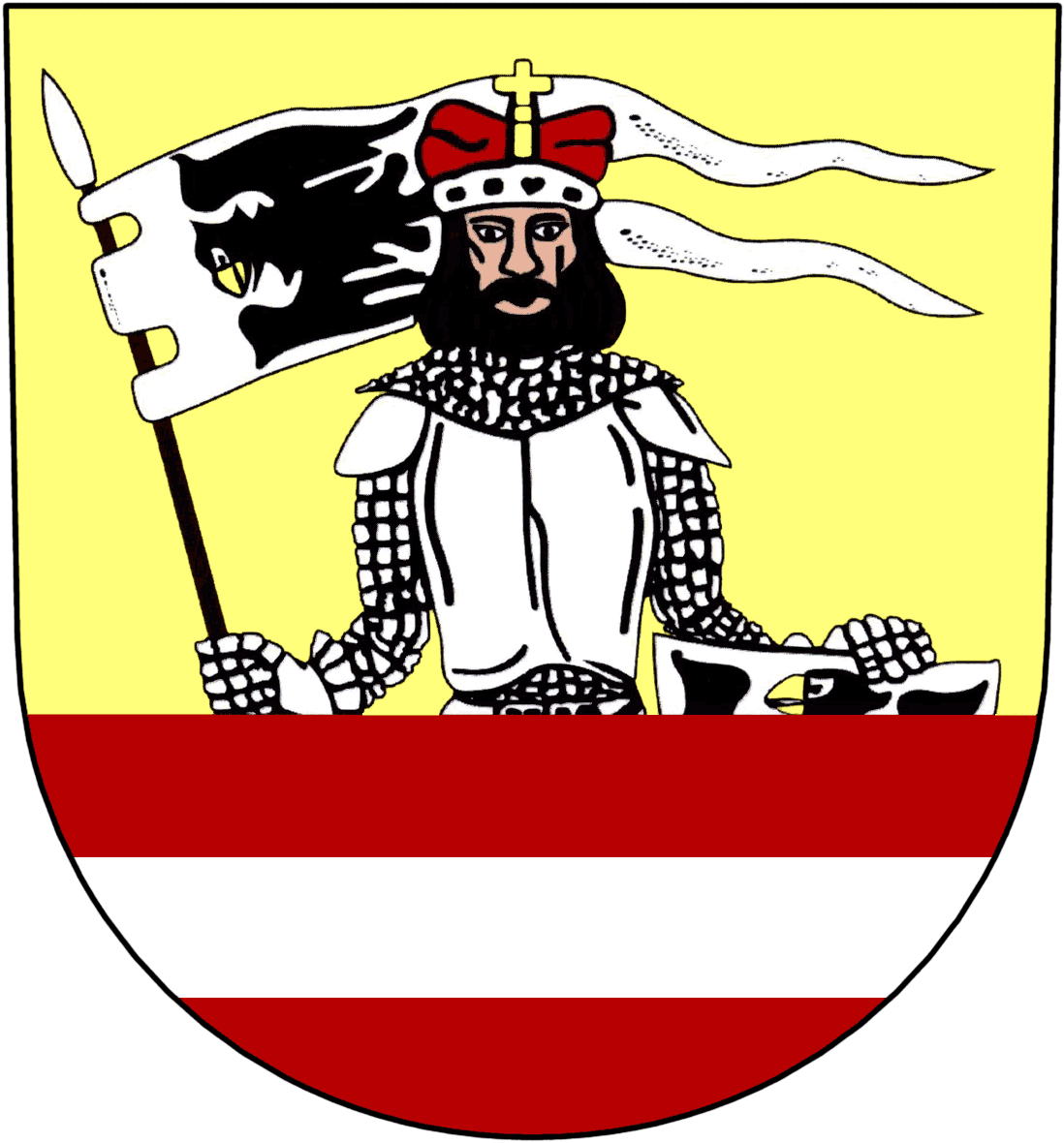
- Flag Coat of arms

- Location in the Czech Republic
- Coordinates: 50°1′41″N 13°34′14″E
- Country: Czech Republic
- Region: Central Bohemian
- District: Rakovník
- First mentioned: 1229

Area
  - Total: 29.05 km^{2} (11.22 sq mi)
- Elevation: 479 m (1,572 ft)

Population (2026-01-01)
  - Total: 907
  - Density: 31.2/km^{2} (80.9/sq mi)
- Time zone: UTC+1 (CET)
  - Summer (DST): UTC+2 (CEST)
- Postal code: 270 34
- Website: www.cista-obec.cz

Čistá (Czech pronunciation: [ˈtʃɪstaː]) is a market town in Rakovník District in the Central Bohemian Region of the Czech Republic. It has about 900 inhabitants.

== Administrative division ==
Čistá consists of eight municipal parts (in brackets population according to the 2021 census):

- Čistá (716)
- Křekovice (11)
- Kůzová (28)
- Lhota (26)
- Nová Ves (17)
- Smrk (10)
- Strachovice (1)
- Zdeslav (72)

== Etymology ==
In Czech, the name Čistá literally means 'clean', 'clear'. It referred either to the clean water of the local stream (today known as Čistecký potok) or to an empty (clear) space in the forest.

== Geography ==
Čistá is located about 14 kilometres (9 mi) southwest of Rakovník and 56 km (35 mi) west of Prague. The municipal territory lies mostly in the Rakovník Uplands, but the southeastern part with the market town proper extends into the Plasy Uplands. The highest point is the hill Lhotský vrch at 606 m (1,988 ft) above sea level. The Javornice Stream flows across the territory of Čistá and supplies there a system of several small fishponds. The stream Čistecký potok flows next to the market town proper, before it joins the Javornice.

== History ==
According to legend, Čistá was founded by Duke Bretislav I in 1039. The first written mention of Čistá is from 1229, when King Ottokar I donated the village to the nobleman Zdislav Držislavic. He founded here a fortress. In the 14th century, Čistá was acquired by the Metropolitan Chapter at Saint Vitus in Prague and became a market village. In 1526, it was promoted to a market town, which helped its further development.

Čistá was damaged by repeated passages of troops during the Thirty Years' War. In the second half of the 17th century, guilds were established and crafts developed, but the market town remained predominantly agricultural. Čistá became known for production of organs, which began there before 1770 and continued for almost 200 years. At the end of the 19th century, Čistá became known for its orchards, in which new varieties of apples, pears, and plums were cultivated.

After World War II, the market town status ceased to exist. In 2026, the market town status was restored to the municipality.

== Demographics ==
Historical population

Year	Pop.	±%
1869	2,843	—
1880	2,885	+1.5%
1890	2,704	−6.3%
1900	2,628	−2.8%
1910	2,637	+0.3%

Year	Pop.	±%
1921	2,398	−9.1%
1930	2,220	−7.4%
1950	1,371	−38.2%
1961	1,349	−1.6%
1970	1,168	−13.4%

Year	Pop.	±%
1980	1,044	−10.6%
1991	920	−11.9%
2001	920	+0.0%
2011	865	−6.0%
2021	881	+1.8%

Source: Censuses

== Transport ==
Čistá is located on the railway line Prague–Kralovice via Rakovník. The line is only in operation during the summer tourist season on weekends and historic trains run on it.

== Sights ==
Chapel of Saint Anne

The main landmark of Čistá is the Church of Saint Wenceslaus. The originally Gothic church was rebuilt and extended in the Baroque style in the 18th century.

The Chapel of Saint Anne is located east of the market town proper. It is a Baroque building, large for a chapel.

== Notable people ==
- Jaroslav Vrchlický (1853–1912), poet; lived here in 1872–1874
