= Zdzisław Bradel =

Polish politician (1950–2020)

Advisor to the Deputy Prime Minister
- In office 1992–1993

President of the Otwock City Council
- In office 1996–1998

Member of the Otwock County Commission
- In office 1998–2002

Personal details
- Born: 21 June 1950 Gdańsk, Poland
- Died: 3 September 2020 (aged 70)
- Education: John Paul II Catholic University of Lublin
- Profession: Politician; Poet; Journalist

Zdzisław Bradel (21 June 1950 - 3 September 2020) was a Polish politician, poet and journalist, who served as Advisor to the Deputy Prime Minister from 1992 to 1993.

== Biography ==
Zdzisław Bradel was born on 21 June 1950 in Gdańsk, Poland. He was a graduate of the Faculty of Humanities at the John Paul II Catholic University of Lublin. He was part of the Circle of Young Writers.

In the years 1976-1977, Bradel provided assistance to the oppressed workers of Radom. From 1977 to 1979, he was co-editor of Meetings: Independent Magazine of Young Catholics, and the author of Evangelical Considerations, among other publications. In 1979, Bradel took part in the hunger strike at the Basilica of Our Lady in Piekary Śląskie. He was part of the campaign to boycott the 1980 Polish legislative election. Since 1980, he was a member of the Movement of Young Poland.

In 1981, Bradel became co-editor of the independent Information Solidarity Bulletin for Region Central-East, in November 1981 assuming the role of editor in chief.

In 1982, he was imprisoned in Iława. Following his release, Bradel was elected as the Chairman of Solidarity in Central and Eastern Poland. He was involved in the Communion and Liberation movement. After 1989, he was, inter alia, editor of Catholic Social Weekly, The Voice, and Catholic Review as well as the industry publication of Poczta Polska.

From 1992 to 1993, Bradel served as Advisor to the Deputy Prime Minister. He was an Otwock City Counselor from 1994 to 1998, the President of the Otwock City Council from 1996 to 1998, and a Member of the Otwock County Commission from 1998 to 2002. After 1990, Bradel was an activist with the Party of Christian Democrats, the Movement for Reconstruction of Poland, and the Christian National Union.
