= Zdzisław Żygulski (art historian) =

Polish art historian

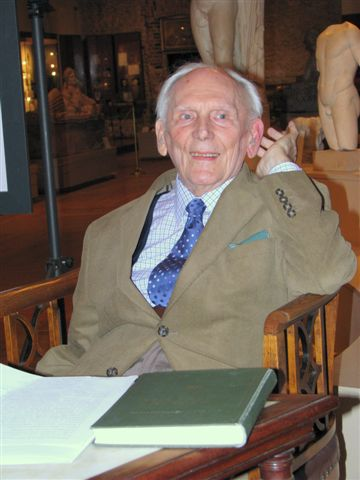
- Zdzisław Żygulski Jr. in Kraków, Poland on 8 November 2009
- Born: 18 August 1921; Borysław, Poland
- Died: 14 May 2015 (aged 93); Kraków, Poland
- Occupation(s): Art historian, academic and educator

Zdzisław Żygulski (18 August 1921 – 14 May 2015) was a Polish art historian and professor of the Academy of Fine Arts in Kraków. The son of Zdzisław Żygulski (senior), he was the curator of the Arms and Armour Section of the Czartoryski Museum from 1949 until his death in 2015 in Kraków, aged 93.

From 1975–81, he was the President of the International Association of Museums of Art and Military History. He lectured at the Academy of Fine Arts in Kraków and at universities in the United States (in New York City and Storrs, Connecticut).

== Notable books ==
- Broń w dawnej Polsce...
- Muzeum Czartoryskich. Historia i zbiory
- Skarby znad Morza Czarnego
- Sztuka perska
- Sztuka turecka
