= Zdzisław Żygulski (literary historian) =

Polish literary historian and Germanist

- Born: 4 April 1888; Przemyśl, Poland
- Died: 22 October 1975 (aged 87); Łódź, Poland
- Occupations: Educator, academic, author

Zdzisław Żygulski (4 April 1888 – 22 October 1975) was a Polish literary historian and Germanist. He was a professor at the universities of Łódź and Wrocław. An expert of German literature of 18th–19th century and antique drama, he published, with Marian Szyrocki, a German literature history textbook Geschichte der deutschen Literatur (vol. 1–4; 1958–1965). His notable works includes Gerhart Hauptmann. Człowiek i twórca (1968), Fryderyk Schiller (1975). His son, also named Zdzisław, was an art historian, academic and educator.
