= Zielona Góra Airport =

Zielona Góra Airport Port Lotniczy Zielona Góra
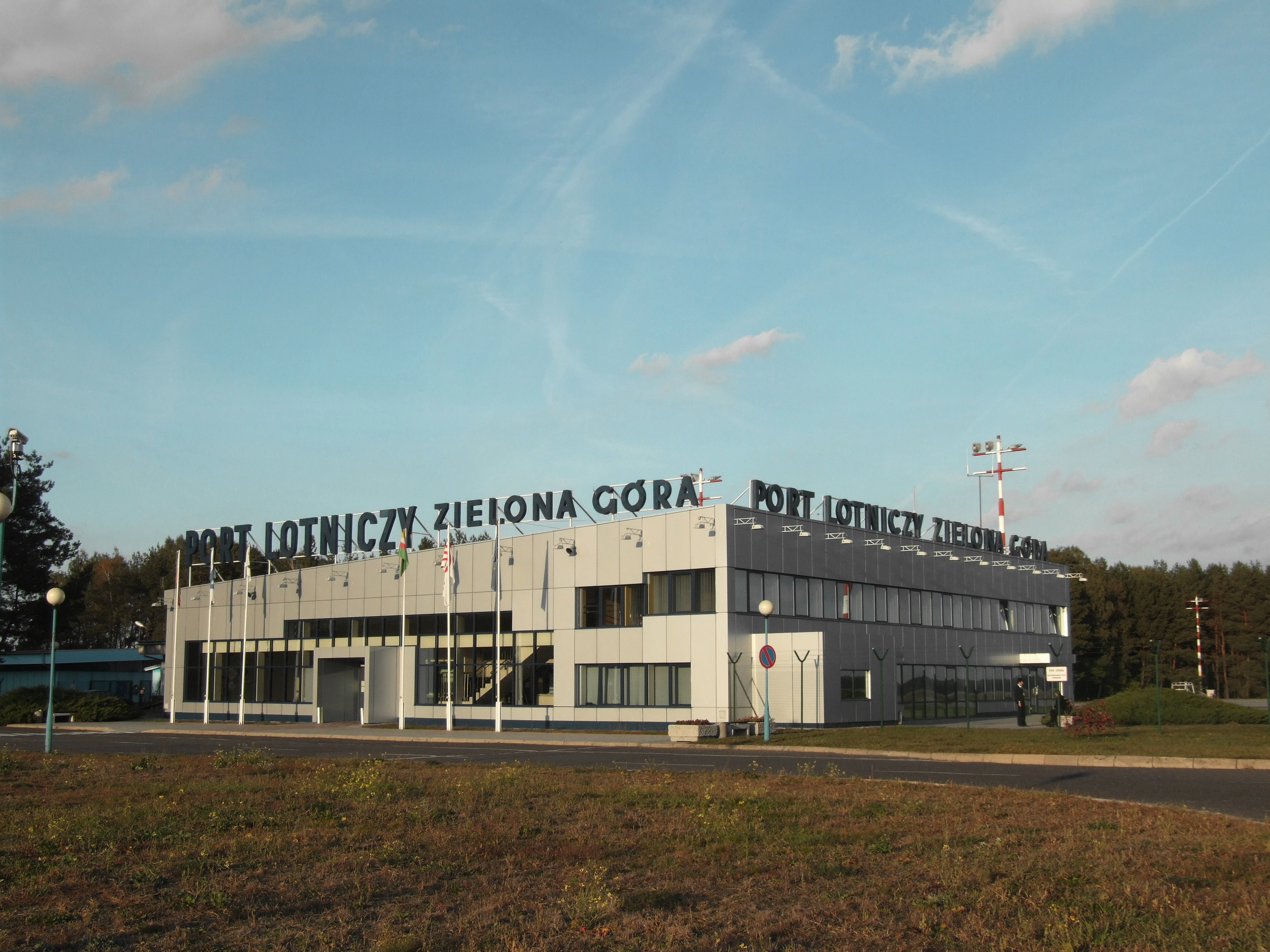
- IATA: IEG; ICAO: EPZG

Summary
- Airport type: Public
- Operator: Przedsiębiorstwo Państwowe "Porty Lotnicze" (PPL)
- Serves: Zielona Góra, Poland
- Elevation AMSL: 59 m / 194 ft
- Coordinates: 52°08′19″N 015°47′55″E
- Website: lotnisko.lubuskie.pl

Map
- Location in Poland

Runways
Direction	Length		Surface
Direction	m	ft	Surface
06/24	2,500	8,202	Concrete

Statistics (2022)
- Passengers: 41,443 ▲101.7%
- Operations: 781 ▲51.6%

Zielona Góra Airport (Polish: Port Lotniczy Zielona Góra-Babimost) (IATA: IEG, ICAO: EPZG) is a regional airport in the Zielona Góra urban area (the Lubusian Tri-city) in western Poland. The airport is 10 km (6.2 mi) from Sulechów, 35 km (22 mi) northeast of the Zielona Góra city centre, in the village of Kramsko, near the town of Babimost, 95 km (59 mi) west of Poznań, 90 km (56 mi) east of the German border, and 170 km (110 mi) from Berlin. Its catchment area consists of the three million inhabitants of Lubusz Land (Ziemia Lubuska) and the west of Greater Poland (Wielkopolska).

The airport is Poland's 14th-busiest, in last place among current airports with scheduled traffic. It has been taken over from the Polish Army by regional authorities and is run by the state-owned Porty Lotnicze (PPL), which also operates Warsaw Chopin Airport. Discussion exists about whether a company created by regional authorities should assume management of the unprofitable airport.

== History ==
Construction of Zielona Góra Airport (a former military base) began in 1954, and it entered service on 10 October 1957. A Lim-6R, which is a Polish built MiG-17 is parked adjacent to the terminal, commemorating the airport's military origin.

Although the first passenger terminal opened in 1977, at least one passenger flight had already operated from the airport (on 21 July 1961, bringing Yuri Gagarin to Zielona Góra). The airport began service to and from Warsaw and Gdańsk in 1977; the first scheduled flights were twice weekly to Warsaw, and the Gdańsk route operated during the 1970s. It hosted twice-daily passenger service to Warsaw until September 2004, when state-owned LOT Polish Airlines discontinued the route after ownership changes at the airport. The army stopped using it as a military base, and dismantled some of its equipment.

The airport was rented to regional authorities in 2005, so its new owner could begin developing the airport. Shifts in the Polish airline market caused financial problems for LOT, and service to Warsaw was suspended because the airline could not obtain suitable mid-sized aircraft for the route.

At the end of 2005, two daily flights to Warsaw were operated by Jet Air; this was later reduced to one. The airport has had short-lived scheduled routes to Gdańsk, Kraków, and Dresden, and service to Warsaw operated via Poznań or Bydgoszcz. It operated charter service to southern Europe and Ukraine during the mid-2010s. In January 2017, it was announced that the airport's only scheduled route (to Warsaw Chopin Airport) would be transferred from SprintAir to LOT.

In December 2022 renderings of a new terminal building were published by an architect studio that won public tendering for the project.

== Infrastructure ==
=== Runway ===
Zielona Góra Airport has a single asphalt-concrete 06/24 runway. The 2,500-metre-long (8,200 ft), 60-metre-wide (200 ft) runway is equipped with an ILS CAT I, allowing aircraft to land in foggy weather. The airport's elevation is 59 metres (194 ft). Its runway has two taxiways leading to two aprons, where up to 10 mid-sized aircraft (such as Boeing 737s or Airbus 321s) may be parked; an additional apron is used in winter for the de-icing of aircraft.

=== Terminals ===
The airport has two passenger terminals (T1 and T2); only T2 is fully functional. T1, built in 1977, has an annual capacity of 150,000 and is used for departures. T2 (built in 2015) is used for arrivals and charter service, and has no check-in or other services. T1 has two check-in desks, basic luggage transport, and a medium-sized departure area with one or two gates. After the completion of the new arrival area, the airport's annual capacity was estimated at 360,000 passengers. A small cargo terminal is next to T1.

== Airlines and destinations ==
The following airlines have regular scheduled and charter services to and from Zielona Góra:

Airlines	Destinations
LOT Polish Airlines	Warsaw–Chopin
Pegasus Airlines	Seasonal charter: Antalya

The nearest larger international airport is Poznań–Ławica Airport, about 95 kilometres (59 mi) east.

== Statistics ==
=== Annual traffic ===
Year	Passengers	Cargo (kg)	Flights
1999	198	0	100
2000	207	0	36
2001	5,624	0	615
2002	7,598	0	681
2003	7,813	0	1,237
2004	3,949	0	400
2005	427	0	163
2006	8,316	0	1,107
2007	6,739	0	714
2008	5,237	0	614
2009	2,955	3,929	642
2010	3,637	5,205	668
2011	6,940	1,591	328
2012	12,276		234
2013	12,568		345
2014	10,682		632
2015	15,550		1,299
2016	8,745		1,147
2017	17,128		1,114
2018	21,269		1,295
2019	33,078		1,778
2020	19,266	0	1,965
2021	20,596	0	1,658
2022	41,543	0	
2023	53,963		
Source: Civil Aviation Authority, Zielona Góra Airport

== Ground transportation ==
=== Road ===
The airport is located close to a junction between motorway A2 (Berlin-Warsaw) and expressway S3. Buses operate between Zielona Góra and the airport, according to flight departure and arrival times to and from Warsaw, from the main bus station (Dworzec PKS).

=== Rail ===
The nearest railway station to the airport is located in the town of Babimost some 6 km (3.7 mi) from the airport, which itself does not have a station. A section of Zielona Góra to Poznań line is currently undergoing renovation and a temporary bus service is in place until the end of the modernisation, which is expected at the end of 2022.

== See also ==
- List of airports in Poland
